= Philippine Senate Committee on Rules =

Standing committee of the Senate of the Philippines

Committee on Rules
- Senate of the Philippines; 20th Congress

History
- New session started: July 28, 2025

Leadership
- Chair: Migz Zubiri (Independent) since June 3, 2026

Structure
- Seats: 9
- Political groups: Majority (6): NPC (2); Akbayan (1); Lakas (1); Liberal (1); Independent (1); Minority (3): PDP (1); Independent (2)

The Philippine Senate Committee on Rules is a standing committee of the Senate of the Philippines.

Its chairperson is the Senate Majority Floor Leader, and its vice chairpersons are the Deputy Majority Leaders.

== Jurisdiction ==
The committee handles all matters affecting the Rules of the Senate, the calendar as well as parliamentary rules and the order and manner of transacting business, and the creation of committees.

== Members, 20th Congress ==
Based on the Rules of the Senate, the Senate Committee on Rules has 9 members.

Position	Member	Party
Chairperson	Juan Miguel Zubiri	Independent
Vice Chairpersons	JV Ejercito	NPC
Vice Chairpersons	Risa Hontiveros	Akbayan
Members for the Majority	Win Gatchalian	NPC
Members for the Majority	Kiko Pangilinan	Liberal
Members for the Majority	Erwin Tulfo	Lakas
Deputy Minority Leaders	Rodante Marcoleta	Independent
Deputy Minority Leaders	Joel Villanueva	Independent
Member for the Minority	Ronald dela Rosa	PDP

Ex officio members:

- Senate President pro tempore Ping Lacson
- Minority Floor Leader Alan Peter Cayetano

Committee secretary: Vanessa Y. Misola

== Historical membership rosters ==
=== 19th Congress ===
Position	Member	Party
Chairperson	Francis Tolentino	Independent
Vice Chairperson	JV Ejercito	NPC
Vice Chairperson	Mark Villar	Nacionalista
Members for the Majority	Sonny Angara	LDP
Members for the Majority	Nancy Binay	UNA
Members for the Majority	Win Gatchalian	NPC
Members for the Majority	Grace Poe	Independent
Members for the Majority	Alan Peter Cayetano	Independent
Member for the Minority	Risa Hontiveros	Akbayan

Committee secretary: Atty. Vanessa Y. Misola

== See also ==
- List of Philippine Senate committees
