= Philippine Senate Committee on Government Corporations and Public Enterprises =

Standing committee of the Senate of the Philippines

Committee on Government Corporations and Public Enterprises
- Senate of the Philippines; 20th Congress

History
- New session started: July 28, 2025

Leadership
- Chair: Mark Villar (Nacionalista) since July 30, 2025

Structure
- Seats: 11
- Political groups: Majority (7): NPC (4); Nacionalista (2); Akbayan (1); Minority (4): PDP (2); Independent (2)

The Philippine Senate Committee on Government Corporations and Public Enterprises is a standing committee of the Senate of the Philippines.

== Jurisdiction ==
According to the Rules of the Senate, the committee handles all matters relating to:

- Government corporations, including all amendments to their charters
- Interests of the government in the different industrial and commercial enterprises
- Privatization

== Members, 20th Congress ==
Based on the Rules of the Senate, the Senate Committee on Government Corporations and Public Enterprises has 11 members.

Position	Member	Party
Chairperson	Mark Villar	Nacionalista
Vice Chairperson	Alan Peter Cayetano (Note: Ex officio member as Senate minority floor leader; not counted in the membership.)	Independent
Deputy Majority Leaders	JV Ejercito	NPC
Deputy Majority Leaders	Risa Hontiveros	Akbayan
Members for the Majority	Win Gatchalian	NPC
Members for the Majority	Lito Lapid	NPC
Members for the Majority	Loren Legarda	NPC
Members for the Majority	Camille Villar	Nacionalista
Deputy Minority Leaders	Rodante Marcoleta	Independent
Deputy Minority Leaders	Joel Villanueva	Independent
Members for the Minority	Ronald dela Rosa	PDP
Members for the Minority	Bong Go	PDP

Ex officio members:

- Senate President pro tempore Panfilo Lacson
- Majority Floor Leader Juan Miguel Zubiri

Committee secretary: Atty. Mervin Carlo H. Marcos

== Historical membership rosters ==
=== 19th Congress ===
Position	Member	Party
Chairperson	Mark Villar	Nacionalista
Vice Chairperson	None	
Members for the Majority	JV Ejercito	NPC
Members for the Majority	Alan Peter Cayetano	Independent
Members for the Majority	Pia Cayetano	Nacionalista
Members for the Majority	Ronald dela Rosa	PDP–Laban
Members for the Majority	Bong Go	PDP–Laban
Members for the Majority	Lito Lapid	NPC
Members for the Majority	Loren Legarda	NPC
Members for the Majority	Robin Padilla	PDP–Laban
Members for the Majority	Raffy Tulfo	Independent
Member for the Minority	Risa Hontiveros	Akbayan

Committee secretary: Cleah D. Nava

=== 18th Congress ===
Position	Member	Party
Chairperson	Richard Gordon	Independent
Vice Chairperson	Win Gatchalian	NPC
Members for the Majority	Manny Pacquiao	PDP–Laban
Members for the Majority	Nancy Binay	UNA
Members for the Majority	Joel Villanueva	CIBAC
Members for the Majority	Cynthia Villar	Nacionalista
Members for the Majority	Bong Go	PDP–Laban
Members for the Minority	Risa Hontiveros	Akbayan
Members for the Minority	Francis Pangilinan	Liberal

Committee secretary: Eleuteria M. Mirasol

== See also ==
- List of Philippine Senate committees
