= Philippine Senate Committee on Social Justice, Welfare and Rural Development =

Standing committee of the Senate of the Philippines

Committee on Social Justice, Welfare and Rural Development
- Senate of the Philippines; 20th Congress

History
- New session started: July 28, 2025

Leadership
- Chair: Erwin Tulfo (Lakas) since July 29, 2025

Structure
- Seats: 9
- Political groups: Majority (6): NPC (2); Akbayan (1); Lakas (1); Liberal (1); Independent (1); Minority (3): Nacionalista (1); PDP (1); PMP (1)

The Philippine Senate Committee on Social Justice, Welfare and Rural Development is a standing committee of the Senate of the Philippines.

== Jurisdiction ==
According to the Rules of the Senate, the committee handles all matters relating to:

- Rural development and welfare
- The Constitution on Social Justice

== Members, 20th Congress ==
Based on the Rules of the Senate, the Senate Committee on Social Justice, Welfare and Rural Development has 9 members.

Position	Member	Party
Chairperson	Erwin Tulfo	Lakas
Vice Chairpersons	Bong Go	PDP
Vice Chairpersons	Imee Marcos	Nacionalista
Deputy Majority Leaders	JV Ejercito	NPC
Deputy Majority Leaders	Risa Hontiveros	Akbayan
Members for the Majority	Win Gatchalian	NPC
Members for the Majority	Kiko Pangilinan	Liberal
Members for the Majority	Raffy Tulfo	Independent
Member for the Minority	Jinggoy Estrada	PMP

Ex officio members:

- Senate President pro tempore Panfilo Lacson
- Majority Floor Leader Juan Miguel Zubiri
- Minority Floor Leader Alan Peter Cayetano

Committee secretary: Maria Clarinda R. Mendoza

== Historical membership rosters ==
=== 18th Congress ===
Position	Member	Party
Chairperson	Leila de Lima^{1}	Liberal
Vice Chairpersons	Nancy Binay	UNA
Vice Chairpersons	Imee Marcos	Nacionalista
Members for the Majority	Joel Villanueva	CIBAC
Members for the Majority	Pia Cayetano	Nacionalista
Members for the Majority	Ronald dela Rosa	PDP–Laban
Members for the Majority	Bong Revilla	Lakas

^{1} De Lima is a member of the Senate minority.

Committee secretary: Gemma Genoveva G. Tanpiengco

== See also ==
- List of Philippine Senate committees
