= Philippine Senate Committee on Tourism =

Standing committee of the Senate of the Philippines

Committee on Tourism
- Senate of the Philippines; 20th Congress

History
- New session started: July 28, 2025

Leadership
- Chair: JV Ejercito (NPC) since July 29, 2025

Structure
- Seats: 15
- Political groups: Majority (9): NPC (4); Nacionalista (2); Akbayan (1); Liberal (1); Independent (1); Minority (6): PDP (3); PMP (1); Independent (2)

The Philippine Senate Committee on Tourism is a standing committee of the Senate of the Philippines.

== Jurisdiction ==
According to the Rules of the Senate, the committee handles all matters relating to Philippine tourism and the tourist industry.

== Members, 20th Congress ==
Based on the Rules of the Senate, the Senate Committee on Tourism has 15 members.

Position	Member	Party
Chairperson	JV Ejercito (Note: Also serving as the deputy majority leader alongside Risa Hontiveros (Akbayan).)	NPC
Vice Chairperson	Ronald dela Rosa	PDP
Deputy Majority Leader	Risa Hontiveros	Akbayan
Members for the Majority	Win Gatchalian	NPC
Members for the Majority	Lito Lapid	NPC
Members for the Majority	Loren Legarda	NPC
Members for the Majority	Kiko Pangilinan	Liberal
Members for the Majority	Raffy Tulfo	Independent
Members for the Majority	Camille Villar	Nacionalista
Members for the Majority	Mark Villar	Nacionalista
Deputy Minority Leaders	Rodante Marcoleta	Independent
Deputy Minority Leaders	Joel Villanueva	Independent
Members for the Minority	Jinggoy Estrada	PMP
Members for the Minority	Bong Go	PDP
Members for the Minority	Robin Padilla	PDP

Ex officio members:

- Senate President pro tempore Panfilo Lacson
- Majority Floor Leader Juan Miguel Zubiri
- Minority Floor Leader Alan Peter Cayetano

Committee secretary: James B. Leocadio

== Historical membership rosters ==
=== 18th Congress ===
Position	Member	Party
Chairperson	Nancy Binay	UNA
Vice Chairpersons	Joel Villanueva	CIBAC
Vice Chairpersons	Koko Pimentel	PDP–Laban
Members for the Majority	Grace Poe	Independent
Members for the Majority	Cynthia Villar	Nacionalista
Members for the Majority	Lito Lapid	NPC
Members for the Majority	Ronald dela Rosa	PDP–Laban
Members for the Majority	Sonny Angara	LDP
Members for the Majority	Richard Gordon	Independent
Members for the Minority	Risa Hontiveros	Akbayan
Members for the Minority	Leila de Lima	Liberal

Committee secretary: Maria Clarinda R. Mendoza

== See also ==
- List of Philippine Senate committees
