= Philippine Senate Committee on Accounts =

Standing committee of the Senate of the Philippines

Committee on Accounts
- Senate of the Philippines; 20th Congress

History
- New session started: July 28, 2025

Leadership
- Chair: vacant since May 11, 2026
- Seats: 13

The Philippine Senate Committee on Accounts is a standing committee of the Senate of the Philippines.

== Jurisdiction ==
According to the Rules of the Senate, the committee handles all matters relating to the auditing and adjustment of all accounts chargeable against the funds for the expenses and activities of the Senate.

== Members, 20th Congress ==
Based on the Rules of the Senate, the Senate Committee on Accounts has 13 members.

As of May 11, 2026
Majority	Minority
Vacant

Ex officio members:

- Senate President pro tempore Loren Legarda
- Acting Majority Floor Leader Joel Villanueva
- Minority Floor Leader Tito Sotto

== Historical membership rosters ==
=== 20th Congress ===
September 23, 2025 – May 11, 2026
Majority	Minority
Panfilo Lacson (Independent), Chair (Note: Ex officio member as Senate President pro tempore; not counted in the membership.)	Rodante Marcoleta (Independent), Deputy Minority Leader
Loren Legarda (NPC), Vice Chair	Joel Villanueva (Independent), Deputy Minority Leader
JV Ejercito (NPC), Deputy Majority Leader	Ronald dela Rosa (PDP)
Risa Hontiveros (Akbayan), Deputy Majority Leader	Bong Go (PDP)
Pia Cayetano (Nacionalista)	Robin Padilla (PDP)
Win Gatchalian (NPC)	
Lito Lapid (NPC)	
Erwin Tulfo (Lakas)	
Mark Villar (Nacionalista)	

Ex officio members:

- Majority Floor Leader Juan Miguel Zubiri
- Minority Floor Leader Alan Peter Cayetano

Committee secretary: Dir. Assumption Ingrid B. Reyes

=== 19th Congress ===
May 20, 2024 – June 30, 2025
Majority	Minority
Alan Peter Cayetano (Independent), Chair	Risa Hontiveros (Akbayan), Deputy Minority Leader
Ronald dela Rosa (PDP), Vice Chair	
Grace Poe (Independent), Vice Chair	
JV Ejercito (NPC), Deputy Majority Leader	
Mark Villar (Nacionalista), Deputy Majority Leader	
Win Gatchalian (NPC)	
Bong Go (PDP)	
Lito Lapid (NPC)	
Robin Padilla (PDP)	
Cynthia Villar (Nacionalista)	

Ex officio members:

- Senate President pro tempore Loren Legarda (July 25, 2022 – May 20, 2024)
- Senate President pro tempore Jinggoy Estrada (May 20, 2024 – June 30, 2025)
- Majority Floor Leader Joel Villanueva (July 25, 2022 – May 20, 2024)
- Majority Floor Leader Francis Tolentino (May 20, 2024 – June 30, 2025)
- Minority Floor Leader Koko Pimentel

Committee secretary: Dir. Felipe T. Yadao Jr.

== See also ==
- List of Philippine Senate committees
