= Philippine Senate Committee on Cultural Communities and Muslim Affairs =

Standing committee of the Senate of the Philippines

Committee on Cultural Communities and Muslim Affairs
- Senate of the Philippines; 20th Congress

History
- New session started: July 28, 2025

Leadership
- Chair: Robin Padilla (PDP) since July 29, 2025

Structure
- Seats: 9
- Political groups: Majority (6): Nacionalista (2); NPC (2); Akbayan (1); Lakas (1); Minority (3): PDP (2); Independent (1)

The Philippine Senate Committee on Cultural Communities and Muslim Affairs is a standing committee of the Senate of the Philippines.

The committee was previously known as the Committee on Cultural Communities until the 19th Congress.

== Jurisdiction ==
According to the Rules of the Senate, the committee handles all matters relating to cultural communities in the Philippines and the Islamic Religion.

== Members, 20th Congress ==
Based on the Rules of the Senate, the Senate Committee on Cultural Communities has 9 members.

Position	Member	Party
Chairperson	Robin Padilla	PDP
Vice Chairpersons	Bong Go	PDP
Vice Chairpersons	Loren Legarda	NPC
Deputy Majority Leaders	JV Ejercito	NPC
Deputy Majority Leaders	Risa Hontiveros	Akbayan
Members for the Majority	Erwin Tulfo	Lakas
Members for the Majority	Camille Villar	Nacionalista
Members for the Majority	Mark Villar	Nacionalista
Deputy Minority Leader	Joel Villanueva	Independent

Ex officio members:

- Senate President pro tempore Panfilo Lacson
- Majority Floor Leader Juan Miguel Zubiri
- Minority Floor Leader Alan Peter Cayetano

Committee secretary: Maria Gina Dellomes

== Historical membership rosters ==
=== 19th Congress ===
Position	Member	Party
Chairperson	Robin Padilla	PDP–Laban
Vice Chairperson	Imee Marcos	Nacionalista
Members for the Majority	JV Ejercito	NPC
Members for the Majority	Mark Villar	Nacionalista
Members for the Majority	Ronald dela Rosa	PDP–Laban
Members for the Majority	Bong Go	PDP–Laban
Members for the Majority	Loren Legarda	NPC
Members for the Majority	Bong Revilla	Lakas
Member for the Minority	Risa Hontiveros	Akbayan

Committee secretary: Bernadine B. Mahinay

== See also ==
- List of Philippine Senate committees
