= Philippine Senate Committee on Ethics and Privileges =

Standing committee of the Senate of the Philippines

Committee on Ethics and Privileges
- Senate of the Philippines; 20th Congress

History
- New session started: July 28, 2025

Leadership
- Chair: Tito Sotto (NPC) since June 17, 2026

Structure
- Seats: 7
- Political groups: Majority (4): Akbayan (1); Lakas (1); Liberal (1); NPC (1); Independent (1); Minority (3): Nacionalista (1); PDP (1); Independent (1)

The Philippine Senate Committee on Ethics and Privileges is a standing committee of the Senate of the Philippines.

== Jurisdiction ==
According to the Rules of the Senate, the committee handles all matters relating to the conduct, rights, privileges, safety, dignity, integrity and reputation of the Senate and its members.

The committee receives and hears ethics complaints against a senator filed by either another senator, a government official, or a Filipino citizen.

== Members, 20th Congress ==
Based on the Rules of the Senate, the Senate Committee on Ethics and Privileges has 7 members.

Position	Member	Party
Chairperson	JV Ejercito (Note: Also serving as the deputy majority leader alongside Risa Hontiveros (Akbayan).)	NPC
Vice Chairperson	Kiko Pangilinan	Liberal
Deputy Majority Leader	Risa Hontiveros	Akbayan
Member for the Majority	Erwin Tulfo	Lakas
Deputy Minority Leader	Rodante Marcoleta	Independent
Members for the Minority	Bong Go	PDP
Members for the Minority	Imee Marcos	Nacionalista

Ex officio members:

- Senate President pro tempore Panfilo Lacson
- Majority Floor Leader Juan Miguel Zubiri
- Minority Floor Leader Alan Peter Cayetano

Committee secretary: Vanessa Y. Misola

== Historical membership rosters ==
=== 19th Congress ===
Position	Member	Party
Chairperson	Francis Tolentino	PDP–Laban
Vice Chairperson	Raffy Tulfo	Independent
Members for the Majority	JV Ejercito	NPC
Members for the Majority	Mark Villar	Nacionalista
Members for the Majority	Ronald dela Rosa	PDP–Laban
Member for the Minority	Risa Hontiveros	Akbayan

Committee secretary: Vanessa Y. Misola

=== 18th Congress ===
Position	Member	Party
Chairperson	Manny Pacquiao	PDP–Laban
Vice Chairperson	none	
Members for the Majority	Richard Gordon	Independent
Members for the Majority	Cynthia Villar	Nacionalista
Members for the Majority	Panfilo Lacson	Independent
Members for the Majority	Ronald dela Rosa	PDP–Laban
Members for the Majority	Francis Tolentino	PDP–Laban
Member for the Minority	Francis Pangilinan	Liberal

Committee secretary: Ethel Hope Dignadice-Villaflor

== See also ==
- List of Philippine Senate committees
