= List of Philippine Senate committees =

This is a list of Philippine congressional committees (standing committees and special committees) that are currently operating in the Senate of the Philippines, the upper house of the Philippine Congress.

The composition of Senate committees is outlined in Rule X of the rules of the Senate.

There are 41 standing committees and 5 congressional oversight, ad hoc, and special committees in Senate for the 20th Congress.

According to the rules of the Senate, the president pro tempore, the majority floor leader, and the minority floor leader are ex officio members of all standing committees.

Unlike other chambers or legislatures, the Senate allows members from the minority to chair certain committees.

== Standing committees ==
As of August 24, 2026
Committee	Chair	Party	Minority leader	Party	Member count
Accountability of Public Officers and Investigations (Blue Ribbon)	Erwin Tulfo	Lakas	Vacant		17
Accounts	Ping Lacson	Independent	Imee Marcos	Nacionalista	13
Agriculture, Food and Agrarian Reform	Kiko Pangilinan	Liberal	Rodante Marcoleta	Independent	17
Banks, Financial Institutions and Currencies	Mark Villar (Note: Chair from the minority bloc)	Nacionalista	Camille Villar	Nacionalista	11
Basic Education	Bam Aquino	KANP	Loren Legarda (Note: Vice chair from the minority bloc)	NPC	15
Civil Service, Government Reorganization and Professional Regulation	Loren Legarda	NPC	Vacant		9
Constitutional Amendments and Revision of Codes	Kiko Pangilinan	Liberal	Bong Go	PDP–Laban	13
Cooperatives	Imee Marcos	Nacionalista	Bong Go	PDP–Laban	11
Cultural Communities and Muslim Affairs	Robin Padilla	PDP–Laban	Vacant		9
Culture and the Arts	Loren Legarda	NPC	Vacant		9
Economic Affairs	Risa Hontiveros	Akbayan	Loren Legarda	NPC	11
Electoral Reforms and People's Participation	Jinggoy Estrada (Note: Currently detained.)	PMP	Vacant		13
Energy	Erwin Tulfo	Lakas	Pia Cayetano	Nacionalista	15
Environment, Natural Resources and Climate Change	Raffy Tulfo	Independent	Vacant		17
Ethics and Privileges	Tito Sotto	NPC	Vacant		7
Finance	JV Ejercito	NPC	See list		20
Foreign Relations	Migz Zubiri	Independent	Vacant		17
Games and Amusement	Lito Lapid	NPC	Bong Go	PDP–Laban	11
Government Corporations and Public Enterprises	Camille Villar	Nacionalista	Alan Peter Cayetano	Independent	11
Health and Demography	Risa Hontiveros	Akbayan	Bong Go	PDP–Laban	13
Higher, Technical and Vocational Education	Joel Villanueva	Independent	Bong Go	PDP–Laban	15
Justice and Human Rights	Kiko Pangilinan	Liberal	Bong Go	PDP–Laban	9
Labor, Employment and Human Resources Development	Joel Villanueva	Independent	Imee Marcos	Nacionalista	15
Local Government	JV Ejercito	NPC	Bong Go	PDP–Laban	15
Migrant Workers	Raffy Tulfo	Independent	Bong Go	PDP–Laban	15
National Defense and Security, Peace, Unification and Reconciliation	Tito Sotto	NPC	Vacant		20
Public Information and Mass Media	Robin Padilla	PDP–Laban	Jinggoy Estrada	PMP	13
Public Order and Dangerous Drugs	Ping Lacson	Independent	Bong Go	PDP–Laban	11
Public Services	Raffy Tulfo	Independent	Vacant		13
Public Works	Tito Sotto	NPC	Imee Marcos	Nacionalista	13
Rules	Migz Zubiri	Independent	Alan Peter Cayetano	Independent	9
Science and Technology	Bam Aquino	KANP	Vacant		7
Social Justice, Welfare and Rural Development	Erwin Tulfo	Lakas	Bong Go	PDP–Laban	9
Sports	Bong Go	PDP–Laban	Vacant		11
Sustainable Development Goals, Innovation and Futures Thinking	Pia Cayetano	Nacionalista	Camille Villar	Nacionalista	9
Tourism	Rodante Marcoleta	Independent	Vacant		15
Trade, Commerce and Entrepreneurship	Bam Aquino	KANP	Vacant		11
Urban Planning, Housing and Resettlement	Chiz Escudero	NPC	Vacant		11
Ways and Means	Ping Lacson	Independent	Vacant		11
Women, Children, Family Relations and Gender Equality	Risa Hontiveros	Akbayan	Vacant		11
Youth	Bong Go	PDP–Laban	Vacant		9

== Congressional oversight and ad hoc committees ==
As of June 17, 2026
Committee	Chair	Party	Senate panel members	Enabling Law/Issuance
Second Congressional Commission on Education (EDCOM II)	Bam Aquino	KANP	5	Republic Act No. 11899
Second Congressional Commission on Education (EDCOM II)	Joel Villanueva	Independent	5	Republic Act No. 11899
Joint Congressional Oversight Committee on Universal Health Care Act	Risa Hontiveros	Akbayan	5	Republic Act No. 11223
Joint Congressional Oversight Committee on Public Expenditures	JV Ejercito	NPC	7	Republic Act No. 12314
Philippine Congress – Bangsamoro Parliament Forum	Vacant		5	Senate Concurrent Resolution No. 3
Joint Congressional Oversight Committee on New Government Procurement	JV Ejercito	NPC	4	Republic Act No. 12009
Joint Congressional Oversight Committee on New Government Procurement	Kiko Pangilinan	Liberal	4	Republic Act No. 12009

== See also ==
- List of Philippine House of Representatives committees
