= Minority Floor Leader =

Minority Floor Leader might refer to:

- Minority Floor Leader of the Senate of the Philippines
- Minority Floor Leader of the House of Representatives of the Philippines

== See also ==
- Floor leader
- Majority Floor Leader of the Senate of the Philippines
- Majority Floor Leader of the House of Representatives of the Philippines
