= List of Philippine senators censured or suspended =

Article VI, Section 16(3) of the 1987 Philippine Constitution gives the Senate the power to suspend or expel a member by a two-thirds vote, or 16 votes of the 24 senators. The Rules of the Senate further provide that the Senate Committee on Ethics and Privileges may recommend that the chamber punish any member for disorderly behavior or suspend or expel a senator by the same threshold. The penalty of suspension cannot exceed 60 days, while expulsion may also be imposed on any member who discloses matters discussed in an executive session.

A senator may also be censured, which is a formal statement of disapproval for the untoward conduct of a member that carries no formal punishment. To date, only two senators have been formally censured, Juan Ponce Enrile in 1988 and Heherson Alvarez in 1996, while only one, José Alejandrino, was suspended for 12 months in 1924.

== Censured senators ==
Year	Portrait	Senator (Birth–Death)	Party	District	Vote count	Reason
1988		Juan Ponce Enrile (1924–2025)	Nacionalista	At-large	—	Wrongfully identifying Paul Aquino, brother of senator Butz Aquino, as chairman of Security Bank while accusing him of being part of the "systematic looting" of the government
1996		Heherson Alvarez (1939–2020)	LDP	At-large	—	Clearing a police official under investigation by the Blue Ribbon Committee for an alleged pyramid scam

== Suspended senators ==
Year	Portrait	Senator	Party	District	Vote count	Reason
1924		José Alejandrino (1870–1951)	Democrata	12th	—	Assault and unethical remarks against Senator Vicente de Vera
