= Nancy Binay =

Filipino politician (born 1973)

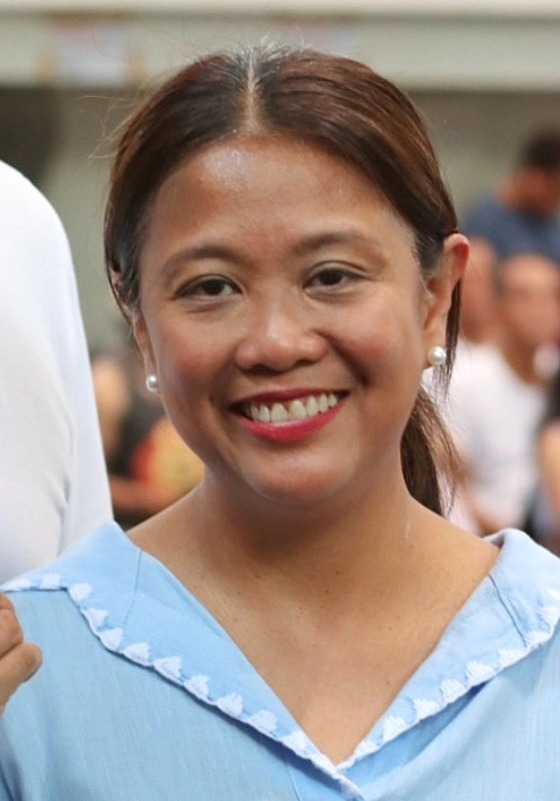
- Binay in 2025

22nd Mayor of Makati
- Incumbent
- Assumed office June 30, 2025
- Vice Mayor: Kid Peña
- Preceded by: Abby Binay

Senator of the Philippines
- In office June 30, 2013 – June 30, 2025

Chair of the Senate Accounts Committee
- In office July 25, 2022 – May 20, 2024
- Preceded by: Panfilo Lacson
- Succeeded by: Alan Peter Cayetano

Chair of the Senate Tourism Committee
- In office July 25, 2016 – May 20, 2024
- Preceded by: Lito Lapid
- Succeeded by: Lito Lapid

Chair of the Senate Science and Technology Committee
- In office July 22, 2019 – June 30, 2022
- Preceded by: Bam Aquino
- Succeeded by: Alan Peter Cayetano

Chair of the Senate Cultural Communities Committee
- In office July 25, 2016 – June 30, 2019
- Preceded by: Loren Legarda
- Succeeded by: Imee Marcos

Personal details
- Born: Maria Lourdes Nancy Sombillo Binay; May 12, 1973 (age 53)
- Party: United Nationalist Alliance
- Spouse: Jose Benjamin Angeles
- Relations: Abigail Binay (sister); Junjun Binay (brother)
- Children: 4
- Parent(s): Jejomar Binay (father); Elenita Binay (mother)
- Education: University of the Philippines Diliman (BS)
- Occupation: Politician

Maria Lourdes Nancy Sombillo Binay-Angeles (born May 12, 1973) is a Filipino politician who is serving as the 22nd mayor of Makati since June 30, 2025. She previously served as a senator of the Philippines from 2013 to 2025.

Binay is the daughter of former Vice President Jejomar Binay. Without any prior experience in government, Binay placed a bid for a seat in the Senate in the 2013 elections and won, placing fifth overall. After being elected, Binay chaired both the Cultural Communities and the Tourism committees of the Senate in the 17th Congress. Binay was re-elected in the 2019 elections for a second consecutive term.

== Education ==
Binay pursued her elementary and secondary education at St. Scholastica's College, Manila. She entered the University of the Philippines Diliman in June 1991, where she initially studied economics before earning a Bachelor of Science in Tourism degree in 1997.

== Political career ==
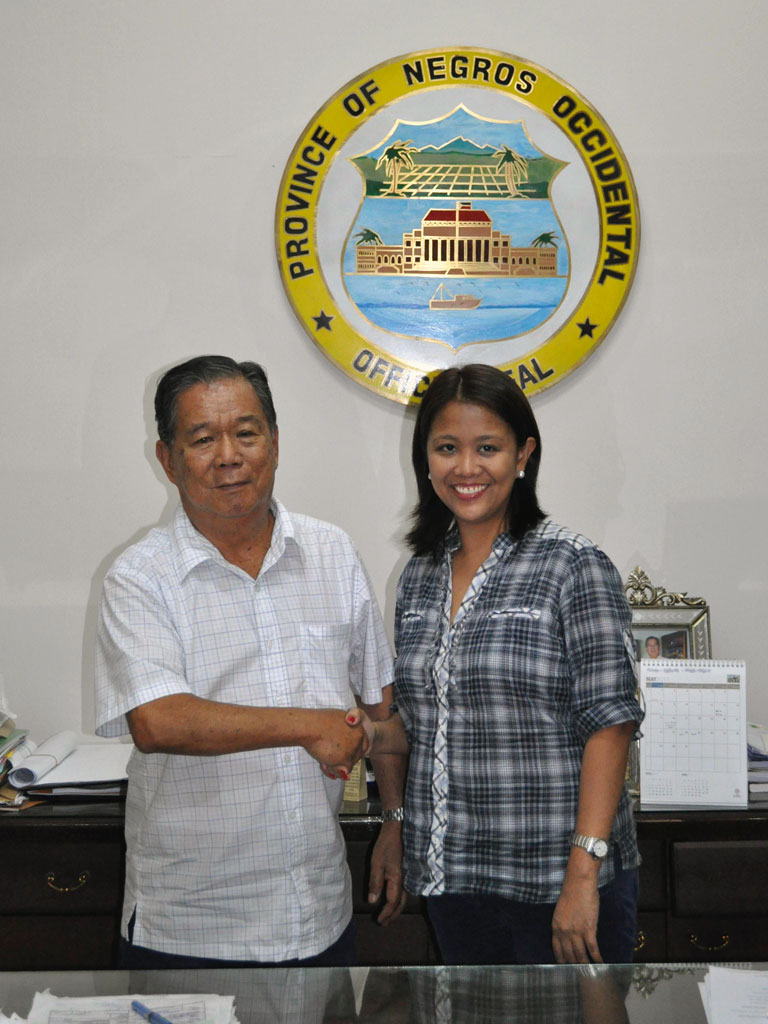
Binay (right) with Negros Occidental Governor Alfredo Marañon Jr. (left) in 2011

Binay is the eldest daughter of Jejomar C. Binay, the former Vice President of the Philippines. and Dr. Elenita Binay. Nancy Binay is also the older sister of Abigail Binay, and Jejomar Binay Jr. Both of her parents and her two younger siblings served as Mayor of Makati.

Between 1998 and 2001, Binay performed administrative duties as a personal assistant to her mother, liaising between the Mayor's office and other governmental departments and offices as well as with the private sector. From 2010, she functioned as personal assistant to her father, who was the vice president at the time. In this role, she liaised between the Office of the Vice President and the Housing and Urban Development Coordinating Council, as well as with other local government offices. In 2012, she was listed as one of the top 20 potential senatorial candidates for the United Nationalist Alliance (UNA).

=== Senate (2013–2025) ===
On October 5, 2012, Binay replaced Joey de Venecia to run for senator in the 2013 elections. De Venecia had earlier withdrawn his candidacy from the UNA's ticket. Binay is a member of the same party, which was also her father's coalition, and she became the party's Deputy Secretary General. Leading up to her selection as a senatorial candidate for the alliance, Binay consistently ranked in the top 12 in the Pulse Asia November 2012 survey, which ranked the popularity of potential candidates.

Binay is a child advocate. The charitable foundations with which she has been involved are geared towards caring for abandoned children and providing educational opportunities for the less fortunate. Her main platform for the 2013 Senate elections was for improving the outlook for pregnant women, particularly those of poor economic status, as a means of improving infant mortality and health.

Binay did not attend any of the public debates for the senatorial candidates, noted pundit J. Prospero de Vera, "preferring to engage in debate when she's already in the Senate."

She was selected as the 12th senatorial nominee for the UNA for the 2013 senatorial race. She won and became a senator in the 16th Congress.

==== 16th Congress ====
Binay won in the 2013 senatorial elections, placing 5th place. She has been criticized for her silence on controversial issues regarding her father from 2013 to 2016, when her father Jejomar Binay, was the vice president of the Philippines, and her opposition to the anti-political dynasty bill as she is part of a political dynasty in Makati, where her father, mother, and brother have become mayors. During the 16th Congress, she filed 119 bills and 151 resolutions advocating the interests of women and children, the youth, the elderly, and housing for the poor. Among her bills that passed into law were An Act Repealing the Crime of Premature Marriage under Article 251 of the Revised Penal Code (R.A. 10655), Sugarcane Industry Development Act of 2015 (R.A. 10659), and An Act Expanding the Benefits and Privileges of Persons with Disability (R.A. 10754). She also sponsored the passage of the Centenarians Act of 2016 (R.A. 10868). She aided in the presidential bid of her father during the 2016 Philippine presidential race. Her father, who initially placed 1st, eventually lost and placed 4th on election day. Binay has been cyber-bullied by numerous Filipino social media comedic accounts due to her fashion sense during the annual SONA and her natural Filipino skin color, to a point that she has been compared with the Black Nazarene. She retaliated stating, 'I was born this way. We should just accept who we are'.

==== 17th Congress ====
In the 17th Congress, Binay supported the Anti-discrimination bill based on SOGIE which protected the rights of Filipino LGBT citizens, the Mental Health Act which establishes a nationwide mental health campaign and inputting of mental health education in the Filipino educational system, the Department of Culture bill which aims to establish a holistic culture department, and the Free Higher Education Law which provides free education in all public colleges and universities in the Philippines. She was co-sponsor of the Expanded Maternity Leave Law of 2017 (SB No. 1305) which grants 120-day maternity leave to female workers regardless of civil status, and The Filipino Sign Language Act (SB No. 1455), which declares the Filipino Sign Language as the national sign language of the Filipino deaf and the official sign language of the government in all transactions with the deaf. She also advocated for the Expanded NIPAS Act of 2017 (SB No. 1444) which enlarged the cover of protected areas in the Philippines, the First 1000 Days of Life Bill (SB 1145), and the amendment to the Local Government Act providing for permanent positions to tourism officers (SB 1565). She was against the re-imposition of the death penalty, the 1,000 peso budget of the Commission on Human Rights, and amending of the 1987 Constitution via a constitutional assembly. Binay favors a constitutional convention over a constitutional assembly. During the burial of Ferdinand Marcos controversy, Binay abstained. She has criticized the government for its deadly Philippine drug war which has killed more than 14,000 Filipinos, government's Presidential Communications Operations Office and government-hired bloggers which have caused the surge in Filipino fake news, government's biased diplomacy with China, and the entrance of Chinese foreign ships in the Philippine Rise which was allowed by the President and his foreign affairs secretary. The House Speaker threatened senators who were not in favor of a constitutional assembly, nonetheless, Binay stood her ground and urged politicians to implement the Local Government Code effectively first before a constitutional change via constitutional convention can begin. In February, she urged government again to end contractualization, especially within government agencies. In March, Binay criticized the management of Boracay, and presidential palace for false alarming statements that caused public panic. She also supported the proposed anti-dynasty bill in the Senate, surprising many as she was against it during her first three years as senator. After the Quo warranto petition against Maria Lourdes Sereno that ousted the Chief Justice, Binay chose to not sign the resolution challenging Sereno's ouster, citing that she 'respect the separation of powers between the legislative and judiciary'. Binay backed the declaration of martial law in Mindanao in 2017 but left the Senate floor during the 2018 voting of the extension of martial law in the region, where majority voted in favor of extension. She was one of the senators who voted in favor of the Tax Reform for Acceleration and Inclusion Law (TRAIN Law).

==== 18th Congress ====
Binay chaired the Senate Committee on Tourism during the 18th Congress. In April 2021, she criticized the Duterte administration's response to the COVID-19 pandemic and that they should admit their inability in handling it.

==== 19th Congress ====
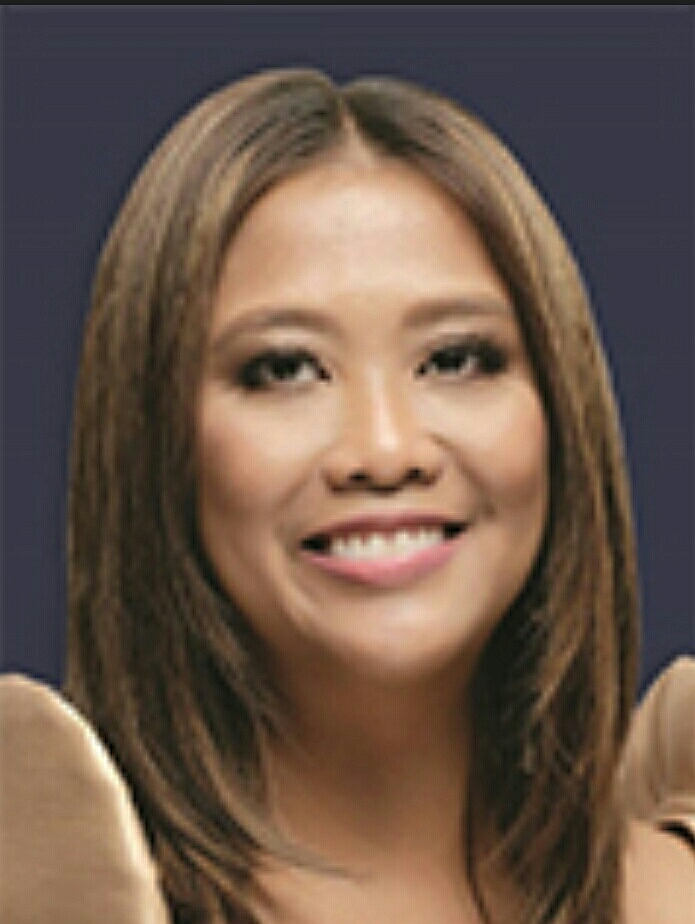
Official portrait of Binay as a senator for the 19th congress, c. 2022

Binay became the chairman of the Senate Committee on Accounts and Committee on Tourism in 2022. In a statement she made in May 2024, Binay acknowledges the role of local street food delicacies in boosting the Philippines' tourism sector.

In July 2024, she filed an ethics complaint against Senator Alan Peter Cayetano over his "unkind" remarks during the Senate hearing on the New Senate Building.

=== Mayor of Makati (since 2025) ===
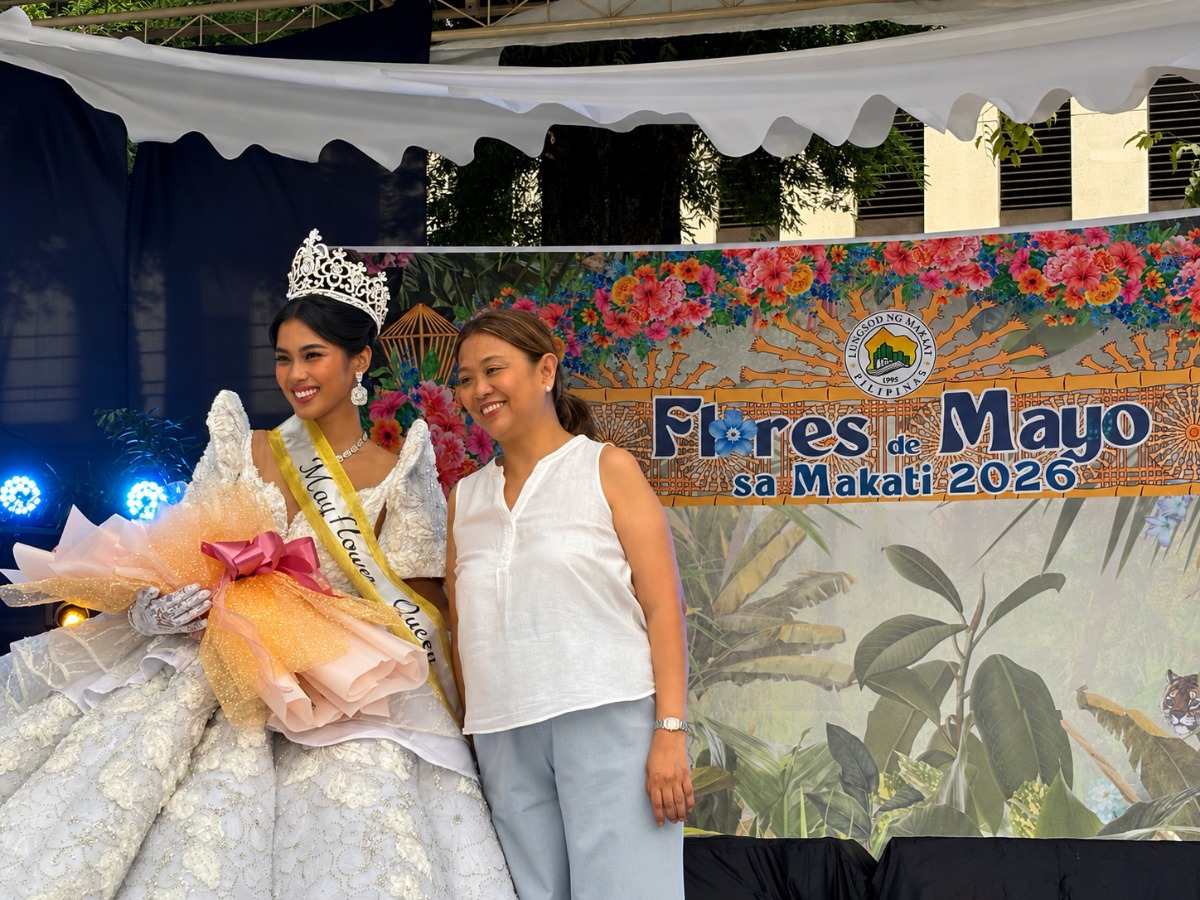
Mayor Binay (right) and Shuvee Etrata (left) at the Flores de Mayo celebration in Makati in May 2026

On October 1, 2024, Binay, being barred from running for re-election in the Senate, filed her candidacy to run for mayor of Makati in 2025, with former 1st district representative Monsour del Rosario as her vice mayoral running mate. She faced off against her brother-in-law, 2nd district Representative Luis Campos, who is the husband of term-limited incumbent Mayor Abigail Binay.

Emerging victorious in the 2025 local elections, she is the fifth member of the Binay family to serve as Mayor of Makati, after her parents, Jejomar and Elenita, and younger siblings, Junjun and Abby, and the third female Mayor of the city. She took office on June 30, 2025.

Few days into her term in July 2025, Binay challenged an $8.96 billion "midnight settlement" her predecessor and sister Abby had signed with Philippine InfraDev Holdings Inc. on June 23, 2025, regarding the shelved Makati Intra-city Subway project. The Singapore International Arbitration Center (SIAC) mandated the city to pay the settlement within 90 days to avoid a $30 million penalty plus interest, though Binay cited the project's cancellation as a reason for not paying. Abby countered that the city's nearly $30 billion cash reserves were sufficient to cover the obligation.

During Binay's term, Makati would host the 2025 Metro Manila Film Festival—the city's first time—following a request from Metropolitan Manila Development Authority (MMDA) Chairman Romando Artes, who also invited her to join the MMFF Executive Committee.

In September 2025, former Department of Public Works and Highways (DPWH) Undersecretary Roberto Bernardo implicated Binay and two other senators in the anomalous flood control projects scandal. Bernardo alleged them to have received commissions from the 2025 DPWH budget. He testified that former DPWH Bulacan 1st District Engineer Henry Alcantara delivered a promised ₱37 million kickback to then-Senator Binay in Quezon City. Binay denied the allegations, asserting that she was quietly dedicated to her duties as Mayor of Makati.

== Personal life ==
Binay is married to Jose Benjamin Angeles, a construction and real estate businessman with whom she has four children. They reside in Barangay San Antonio, Makati.

== Electoral history ==
Electoral history of Nancy Binay
| Year | Office | Party | Votes received | | | | Result |
| Year | Office | Party | Total | % | P. | Swing | Result |
|---|---|---|---|---|---|---|---|
| 2013 | Senator of the Philippines | UNA | 16,812,148 | 41.88% | 5th | —N/a | Won |
| 2019 | Senator of the Philippines | UNA | 14,504,936 | 30.67% | 12th | -11.21 | Won |
| 2025 | Mayor of Makati | UNA | 114,898 | 56.30% | 1st | —N/a | Won |
