= JV Ejercito =

Senator of the Philippines since 2022 (born 1969)

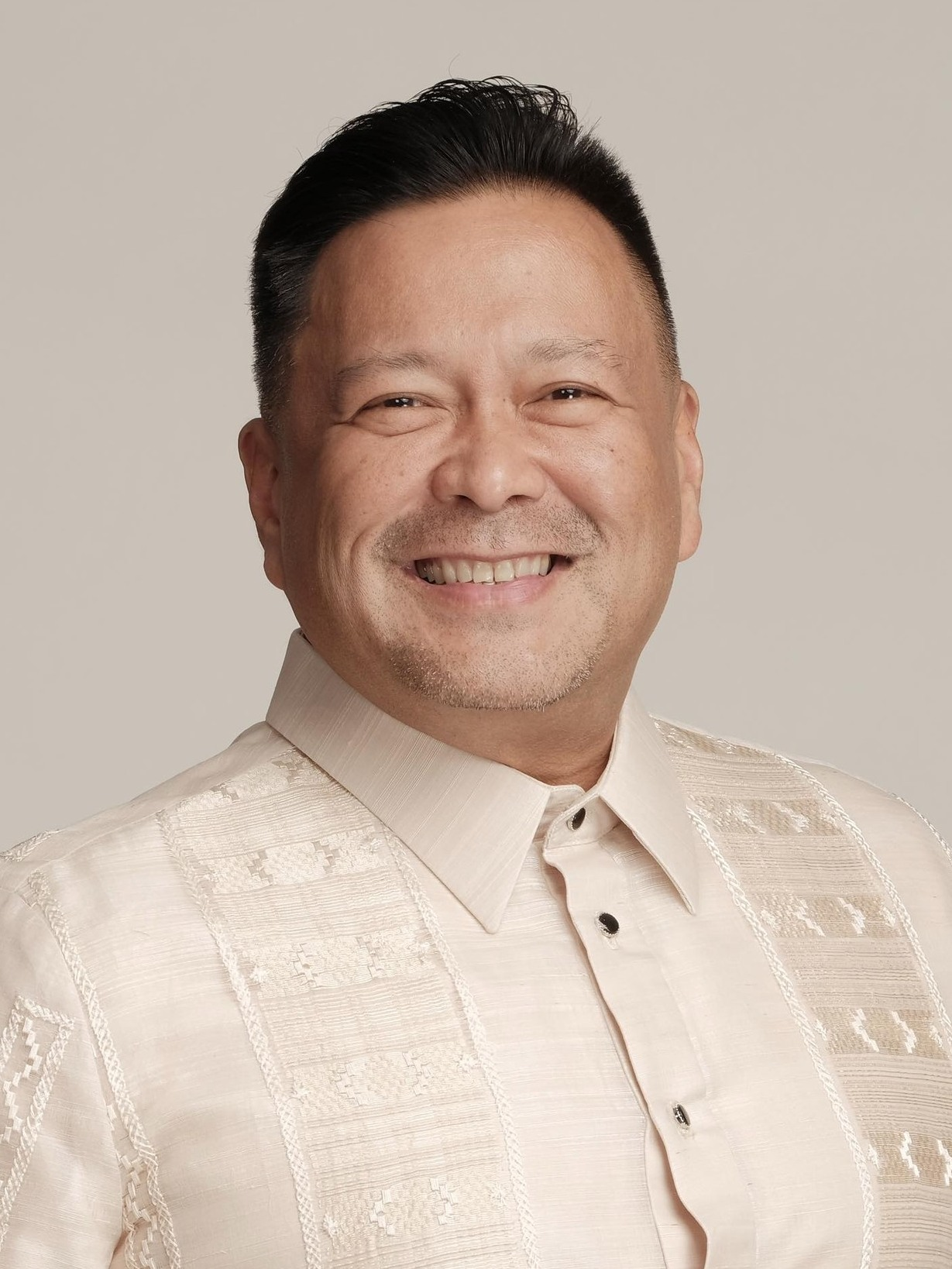
- Official portrait, 2025

Senate Deputy Majority Leader
- Incumbent
- Assumed office June 17, 2026 Serving with Joel Villanueva
- Leader: Juan Miguel Zubiri
- In office July 23, 2024 – May 11, 2026 Serving with Mark Villar (until June 30, 2025); Rodante Marcoleta (July 30 to September 8, 2025); Risa Hontiveros (September 8, 2025 to May 11, 2026)
- Leader: Francis Tolentino; Joel Villanueva; Juan Miguel Zubiri
- In office August 2, 2022 – May 20, 2024 Serving with Mark Villar
- Leader: Joel Villanueva

Senator of the Philippines
- Incumbent
- Assumed office June 30, 2022
- In office June 30, 2013 – June 30, 2019

Chair of the Senate Local Government Committee
- Incumbent
- Assumed office June 17, 2026
- Preceded by: Jinggoy Estrada
- In office July 26, 2022 – September 15, 2025
- Preceded by: Francis Tolentino
- Succeeded by: Jinggoy Estrada

Chair of the Senate Finance Committee
- Incumbent
- Assumed office June 3, 2026
- Preceded by: Mark Villar

Member of the House of Representatives from San Juan's district
- In office June 30, 2010 – June 30, 2013
- Preceded by: Ronaldo Zamora
- Succeeded by: Ronaldo Zamora

17th Mayor of San Juan
- In office June 30, 2001 – June 30, 2010
- Vice Mayor: Boy Celles
- Preceded by: Jinggoy Estrada
- Succeeded by: Guia Gomez

Personal details
- Born: Joseph Victor Gomez Ejercito; December 26, 1969 (age 56) Manila, Philippines
- Party: NPC (2018–present); Partido Magdiwang (local party; 2009–present)
- Other political affiliations: PMP (2001–2018)
- Spouse: Ma. Hyacinth Lotuaco (m. 2007)
- Relations: Ejercito family
- Children: 2
- Parents: Joseph Estrada; Guia Gomez
- Education: De La Salle University (BA)
- Occupation: Politician, businessman
- Website: jvejercito.com

Joseph Victor Gomez Ejercito (Tagalog pronunciation: [ʔɛˌhɛːɾ.sɪˈto]; born December 26, 1969), also known as JV Ejercito Estrada or simply JV Ejercito, is a Filipino politician and businessman serving as a Senator since 2022 and previously from 2013 to 2019. He had also served as the representative of San Juan from 2010 to 2013 and was the city's mayor from 2001 to 2010. He is a son of former president Joseph Estrada, and a half-brother of Senator Jinggoy Estrada.

After his father and half-brother were arrested for plunder on April 25, 2001, Ejercito was among the politicians who spoke against the Second EDSA Revolution at pro-Estrada rallies that preceded the May 1 riots near Malacañang Palace.

Ejercito credits himself as the author of the Universal Health Care Act of the Philippines.

== Early life ==
Joseph Victor "JV" G. Ejercito was born December 26, 1969, in Manila to actors Joseph Ejercito Estrada, the then mayor-elect of San Juan (then a municipality of Rizal), and Guia Gomez, who is also a businesswoman. His given name Joseph Victor is derived from his father and the latter's electoral protest victory to become San Juan mayor in the same year, respectively.

== Education ==
He attended Xavier School for his primary and secondary education and completed his Bachelor of Arts in Political Science at De La Salle University.

== Political career ==
=== Mayor of San Juan ===
On February 27, 2001, Ejercito filed his candidacy to run for mayor of San Juan. Despite his father's removal from office as President of the Philippines due to the Second EDSA Revolution a month prior, Ejercito stated that in San Juan, "there is still a strong clamor for me to run." He eventually served as mayor for three consecutive terms from 2001 to 2010. It was during his term when San Juan was converted into a highly urbanized city in 2007. He was succeeded by his mother Guia Gomez.

=== House of Representatives ===
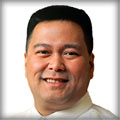
Portrait during the 15th Congress

During the 2010 elections, Ejercito ran for the position of representative for the lone district of San Juan. Over the course of his term, Ejercito authored or sponsored 161 bills and House measures, five of which were approved by the House and passed to the Senate for consideration:

- HB 4225: Participatory Governance Through CSOs Empowerment Act of 2011
- HB 4541: Mercury Exposure Information Act of 2011
- HB 4565: Local Housing Boards Act
- HB 5870: Cadastral Survey Act of 2012
- HB 6144: Domestic Workers Act of 2012 or Kasambahay Bill

=== Senate ===
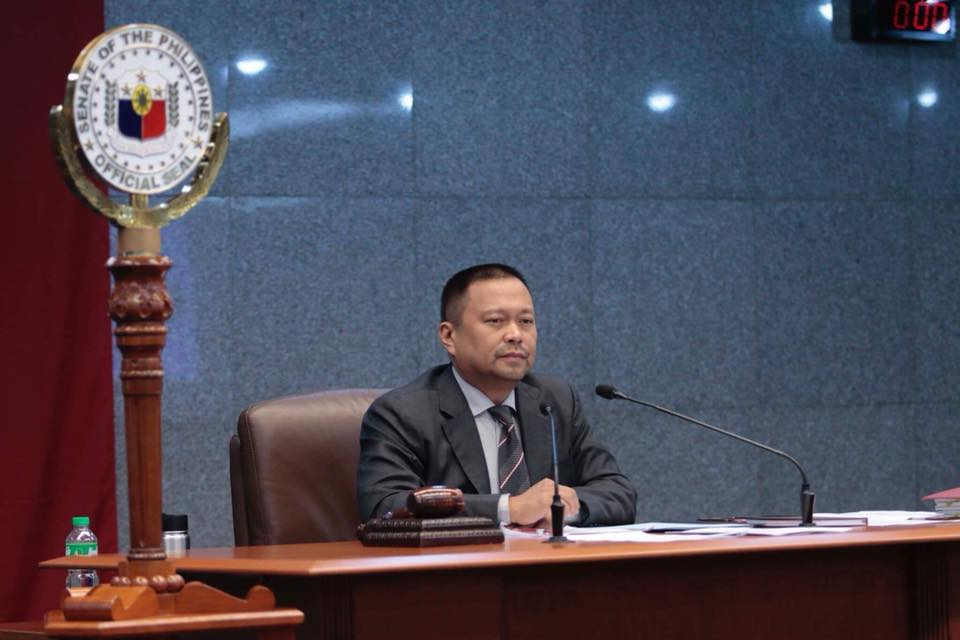
Ejercito presiding over a Senate session in 2017

On October 1, 2012, Ejercito filed his certificate of candidacy for the 2013 Philippine Senate election, where he won as the 11th placer out of 12 winning senators elected.

During his six years in the Senate, Ejercito filed a total of 140 bills and resolutions. Ejercito also chaired the Senate Committee on Economic Affairs and the Committee on Urban Planning, Housing and Resettlement and the Health and the Demography Committee in the 17th Congress.

He was the principal sponsor of the Child Safety in Motor Vehicles Act (R.A. 11229), which requires children 12 years old and below and shorter than 1.50 m (4 ft 11 in) to sit on child safety seats when riding in a vehicle.

On April 6, 2016, Sandiganbayan Fifth Division issued an arrest warrant against Ejercito and four other government officials, in connection with allegations on misuse of P2.1 million in calamity funds during his term as San Juan mayor. Ejercito and his co-accused were acquitted in August 2017.

Ejercito ran and launched a campaign to secure a second consecutive term in the 2019 Philippine Senate election, his candidacy was endorsed by President Rodrigo Duterte. His half-brother, former Senator Jinggoy, who was previously jailed and charged with multiple counts of plunder in 2014, also sought a Senate return. During the campaign, the siblings had a disagreement in the idea of them running at the same time, Ejercito expressed that Estrada running would "ruin his chances", he also threw shade against Estrada as he referred himself as "The Good One" in political ads. Eventually, the half-siblings both lost as Ejercito ended up in 13th place, just a spot outside the winning circle, while Estrada finished at 15th place. After conceding defeat, Estrada wished that Senator Nancy Binay would make it over Ejercito, with both senators vying for the last spot in the partial and unofficial count, Ejercito responded by telling Estrada that he placed 13th in his own hometown, "Let him speak... It's painful to accept that even in your own bailiwick you are unwanted".

Ejercito sought for a comeback to the Senate in 2022 and won as the 10th placer, earning his second nonconsecutive term. His half-brother Jinggoy Estrada was also successful as he placed 12th. In August 2022, he was elected deputy majority leader, alongside Mark Villar, and chair of the Senate Committee on Local Government and the Senate Committee on Urban Planning, Housing and Resettlement. On May 20, 2024, he stepped down as deputy majority leader following changes in the Senate leadership that saw the resignation of Migz Zubiri as Senate President.

On May 11, 2026, Ejercito voted to abstain in the Senate reorganization that saw the election of Alan Peter Cayetano as Senate President, replacing Tito Sotto.

== Personal life ==
Ejercito is married to Hyacinth "Cindy" Lotuaco with whom he has a son, Julio Jose. He also has another son, Jose Emilio, from his previous relationship with model Patty Betita. Joseph Victor is also a Commissioned Reserve Officer of the Philippine Marine Corps with the rank of Major. He is an adopted member of the Philippine Military Academy Class of '88, Maringal.

Ejercito has a tattoo on his right arm: A red eight-rayed sun with the baybayin character for ka at the center, and the phrase Para sa Bayan ("For the country") and the letter "K" on top of the sun. He has also raced in the Toyota Vios Cup. He is also an avid cyclist, having received attention for biking from his residence in San Juan to the Senate building in Pasay, and for an incident where he fell off his bike after tripping on a pothole along Roxas Boulevard a year prior.

== Electoral history ==
Electoral history of JV Ejercito
Year	Office	Party	Votes received				Result
Year	Office	Party	Total	%	P.	Swing	Result
2001	Mayor of San Juan	PMP	—N/a	—N/a	1st	—N/a	Won
2004	Mayor of San Juan	PMP	—N/a	—N/a	1st	—N/a	Won
2007	Mayor of San Juan	PMP	—N/a	—N/a	1st	—N/a	Won
2010	Representative (San Juan)	PMP	47,840	100.00%	1st	—N/a	Unopposed
2013	Senator of the Philippines	PMP	13,684,736	34.09%	11th	—N/a	Won
2019	Senator of the Philippines	NPC	14,313,727	30.26%	13th	−3.83	Lost
2022	Senator of the Philippines	NPC	15,841,858	28.52%	10th	−1.74	Won
