= Joel Villanueva =

Senator of the Philippines since 2016 (born 1975)

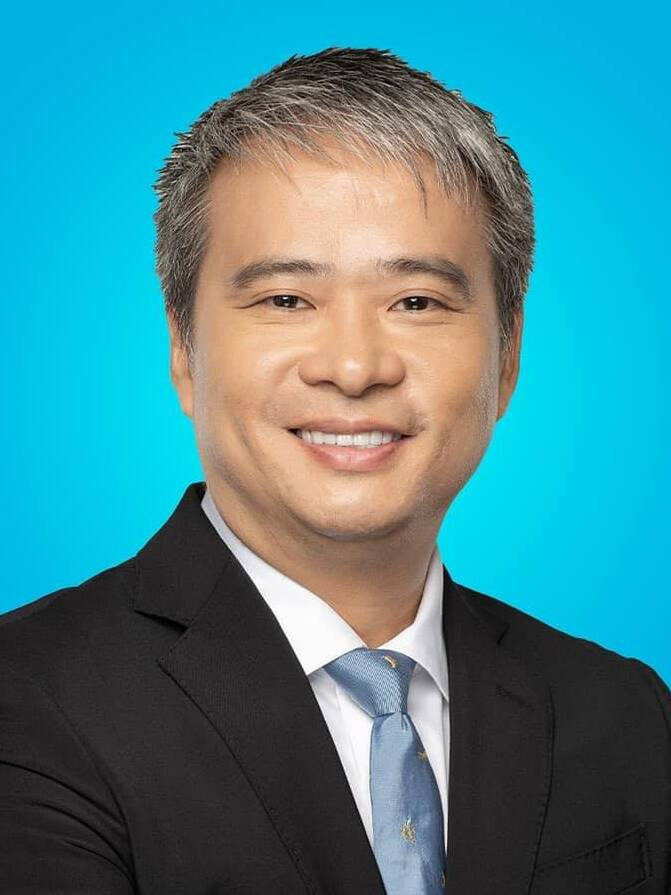
- Official portrait, 2022

Senate Majority Leader
- Acting
- In office May 11, 2026 – June 3, 2026
- Preceded by: Juan Miguel Zubiri
- Succeeded by: Juan Miguel Zubiri
- In office July 28, 2025 – September 8, 2025
- Deputy: JV Ejercito; Rodante Marcoleta
- Preceded by: Francis Tolentino
- Succeeded by: Juan Miguel Zubiri
- In office July 25, 2022 – May 20, 2024
- Deputy: JV Ejercito; Mark Villar
- Preceded by: Juan Miguel Zubiri
- Succeeded by: Francis Tolentino

Senate Deputy Majority Leader
- Incumbent
- Assumed office June 17, 2026 Serving with JV Ejercito
- Leader: Juan Miguel Zubiri
- Preceded by: Risa Hontiveros

Senator of the Philippines
- Incumbent
- Assumed office June 30, 2016
Committee positions
Chair of the Senate Higher, Technical and Vocational Education Committee
In office July 22, 2019 – June 30, 2022
Preceded by	Francis Escudero
Succeeded by	Francis Escudero
Chair of the Senate Labor, Employment, and Human Resources Development Committee
In office July 25, 2016 – June 30, 2022
Preceded by	Jinggoy Estrada
Succeeded by	Jinggoy Estrada
Chair of the Senate Youth Committee
In office July 25, 2016 – June 30, 2019
Preceded by	Bam Aquino
Succeeded by	Sonny Angara

Director General of the Technical Education and Skills Development Authority
- In office June 30, 2010 – October 13, 2015
- President: Benigno Aquino III
- Preceded by: Augusto Syjuco, Jr.
- Succeeded by: Irene Isaac

Member of the House of Representatives for CIBAC
- In office February 6, 2002 – June 30, 2010
- Succeeded by: Sherwin Tugna

Personal details
- Born: Emmanuel Joel Jose Villanueva; August 2, 1975 (age 51) Bocaue, Bulacan, Philippines
- Party: Independent (2013–2015; 2019–present); CIBAC (party-list; 2001–present)
- Other political affiliations: Liberal (2015–2019); Bangon (2004–2013)
- Spouse: Gladys Cruz
- Children: 2
- Parents: Eddie Villanueva (father); Adoracion Villanueva (mother)
- Education: University of Santo Tomas (BS)
- Website: Official website
- Basketball career

Career information
- College: UST

Career history
- 2013: Congress-LGU Legislators
- c. 2014: Malacañang Patriots
- 2016-present: Senate Defenders

Career highlights
- UNTV Cup (season 6) champion; UAAP champion (1994)

Emmanuel Joel Jose Villanueva (/vɪljɑːnuːwɛbɑː/, born August 2, 1975), nicknamed "Tesdaman", is a Filipino politician and pastor who has served as the Senate deputy majority floor leader since 2026, having been a senator of the Philippines since 2016.

A son of evangelist and politician Eddie Villanueva, founder of Jesus Is Lord Church Worldwide, he is a graduate of the University of Santo Tomas. He initially dreamt of becoming a professional basketball player before starting his political career in the House of Representatives, representing CIBAC party-list from 2002 to 2010. Entering the chamber at the age of 26, he was the youngest member of the House when he assumed office. From 2010 to 2015, he served as the Director General of the Technical Education and Skills Development Authority (TESDA) from 2010 to 2015 in the administration of President Benigno Aquino III.

== Early life and education ==
Joel Villanueva was born on August 2, 1975, in Bocaue, Bulacan. He is the second of four children of the Philippine Christian evangelist Eddie Villanueva and Adoracion "Dory" Jose-Villanueva. He attended the University of Santo Tomas, where he graduated high school and Bachelor of Science in Commerce degree, with a Major in Economics in 1996. He attended Harvard Extension School in the United States for Special Studies in Business Administration from 1996 to 1998.

Villanueva has claimed that he was among the people who initiated the Second EDSA Revolution against President Joseph Estrada in January 2001, alleging that he blocked Epifanio de los Santos Avenue with his car in protest of Estrada's corrupt administration.

== House of Representatives ==
Villanueva was elected to the Philippine House of Representatives in 2001 as a party-list representative of the Citizens' Battle Against Corruption (CIBAC). However, his oath-taking was stalled for seven months following issues that CIBAC was an extension of the Jesus Is Lord Church Worldwide, a Christian church founded by his father, Eddie Villanueva. At age 26, Villanueva took his oath of office in February 2002, becoming the youngest member of the House of Representatives (a distinction previously held by Felix William Fuentebella).

Villanueva was a member of the 12th, 13th, and 14th Congresses, spanning 2002 through 2010. At the 12th Congress, he became the first party-list representative, minority leader of the House's Commission on Appointments, and assistant majority leader in the House. He was also among the principal sponsors of Republic Act No. 9485 (the Anti Red-Tape Law of 2007). In the 13th Congress, he served as a deputy minority leader in the House.

== TESDA ==
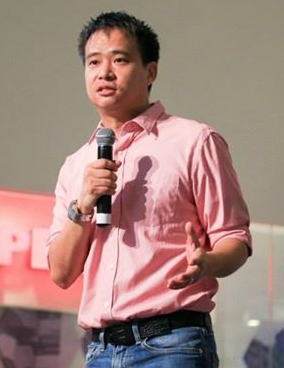
Villanueva in 2015

He was appointed by President Benigno Aquino III as TESDA chief in 2010. Upon assuming his post as head of TESDA, Villanueva initiated an audit of the agency stemming from a ₱2.4 billion sponsorship debt related to undocumented TESDA scholarships. The audit reduced the agency's debt to ₱880 million after eliminating "ghost schools" and "ghost scholars".

As TESDA chief, he initiated the "Shoot for your Dream" series, an aspirational program which involved exhibition games featuring Philippine Basketball Association legends. Villanueva himself played as part of the basketball exhibition team, named "Team Trabaho".

Under his watch, TESDA's central office, as well as 17 regional offices and 81 provincial offices, were granted ISO certifications. Among these certifications included the office at the Autonomous Region in Muslim Mindanao, the first TESDA office to receive such a certification in Mindanao.

While in office as Director General of TESDA, he completed an extensive vocational course in Advanced Food and Beverage Services within the agency for training as a barista.

In August 2016, the National Bureau of Investigation filed graft and corruption charges against Joel Villanueva, Senator Gregorio Honasan, and other lawmakers in relation to the pork barrel scam.

Prior to launching a senatorial bid, he tendered his resignation from the post on October 9, 2015. His resignation became effective on October 13, 2015, and President Benigno Aquino III named TESDA deputy director general Irene Isaac as his successor.

== Senate ==
Villanueva ran for senator under the Koalisyon ng Daang Matuwid in the 2016 senatorial elections. He was also a shared candidate in the 10-member senatorial slate of the late presidential candidate Miriam Defensor Santiago. He filed his certificate of candidacy at the Commission on Elections on October 16, 2015. He unexpectedly won the Senate race, landing in second place with 18,459,222 votes.

Campaigning under the moniker "TESDA Man" (alternatively spelled as Tesdaman) alluding to his previous experience as head of TESDA, Villanueva's platform is focused on employment. His platform is likewise abbreviated into TESDA – which stands for Trabaho, Edukasyon, Serbisyo, Dignidad and Asenso (Employment, Education, Service, Dignity and Progress).

=== Involvement in the pork barrel scam ===
In 2013, documents received by the Philippine Daily Inquirer from pork barrel scam whistleblower Benhur Luy had listed Villanueva among the government officials who received kickbacks in the diversion of Priority Development Assistance Fund (PDAF) allocations as organized by Janet Lim-Napoles. However, the Department of Justice under Secretary Leila de Lima ultimately did not charge him due to the National Bureau of Investigation's conclusion in March 2014 that the documents' signatures were forged.

On November 14, 2016, Ombudsman Conchita Carpio-Morales ordered Villanueva's dismissal from the Senate for "grave misconduct, serious dishonesty, and conduct prejudicial to the interest of the service" over alleged misuse of his PDAF in 2008, during his tenure as a CIBAC representative, amounting to 10 million pesos. Villanueva claimed that the incriminating documents against him were forged. The Commission on Audit ordered the disallowance of the P10-million transaction in 2014. According to the Ombudsman, funds were released through bogus NGOs for an agricultural and livelihood "ghost project". The Ombudsman also flagged other irregularities, such as how the list of beneficiaries was bogus and the fact that the beneficiary towns were not suitable for farming. Other supporting documents were allegedly fabricated, including liquidation, disbursement records, and accomplishment reports. The Ombudsman directed Senate President Koko Pimentel to implement the order against Villanueva. Amid the administrative charged filed after a series of in-depth Ombudsman investigations, criminal charges were also filed against Villanueva in the Sandiganbayan, which include two counts of violation of the Anti Graft and Corrupt Practices Act and one count of malversation through falsification of public documents.

In July 2019, Ombudsman Samuel Martires granted Villanueva's motion to reconsideration against Morales' 2016 decision. This decision was not widely known to the public until only October 2025, when Martires' successor Jesus Crispin Remulla planned to communicate to the Senate urging them to implement the 2016 decision. Remulla cited what he called was Martires' "secret order" to abort his plan to write to the Senate, previously oblivious to the existence of the 2019 decision.

Villanueva earlier called Remulla's bid as "harassment" and has documents dated September 10, 2025 from both the Sandiganbayan and the Office of the Ombudsman that he is not facing any pending cases.

=== 19th Congress ===
Villanueva ran for re-election in the 2022 senatorial elections. Running as an independent candidate, he was named as a guest candidate of the Lacson–Sotto, MP3 Alliance, and TRoPa slates. According to data from Nielsen, Villanueva was among the biggest campaign spenders in the Senate race, having spent ₱1.73 billion during the pre-campaign period and ₱1.05 billion during the campaign period. He was successful, landing ninth place with 18,539,537 votes. He was later named Senate majority leader at the opening of the 19th Congress. New San Jose Builders gave Villanueva a campaign donation of ₱20 million, which was biggest corporate donation to a senatorial aspirant in the 2022 elections. The Philippine Center for Investigative Journalism noted that the donation constitutes a possible election violation of the ban on giving or receiving donations from corporations with active government contracts.

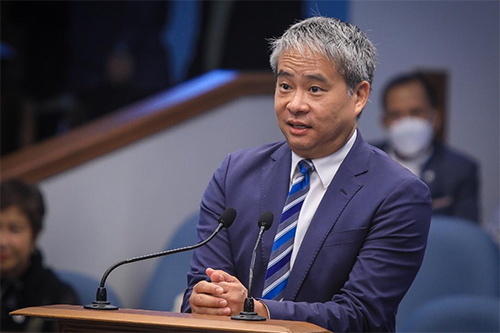
Villanueva during a Senate session discussing the 2025 budget

Upon the opening of the 19th Congress on July 25, 2022, Villanueva regained his title as the Senate majority floor leader. He would serve in this capacity until leadership changes on May 20, 2024, when Senator Francis Escudero became the Senate President, replacing Senator Juan Miguel Zubiri. He was succeeded by Francis Tolentino.

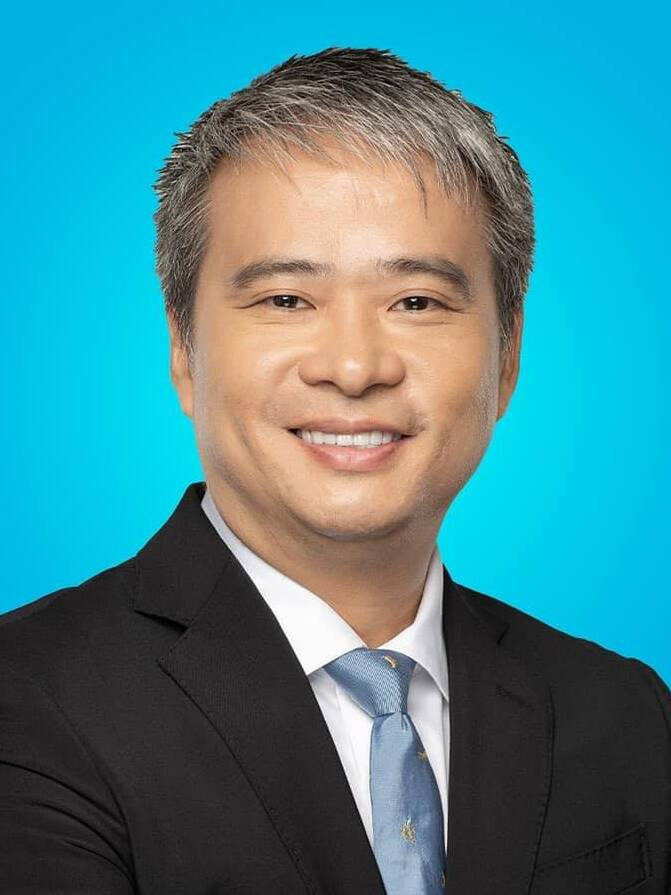
Official portrait, 2022

In September 2024, the House Committee on Appropriations plans to cut ₱1.29 billion to the proposed ₱2 billion budget of the Office of the Vice President in 2025. According to the said committee, this was due to the "lack of information" given from Vice President Sara Duterte. Villanueva questioned the budget cut and treatment made by the House committee on the OVP. He cited some "inconsistency" and encourage that the committee must continue tradition of implementing the rules regardless of the officials involved.

In June 2025, during the impeachment trial of Vice President Sara Duterte, Villanueva was caught on video coaching Senator Imee Marcos to interrupt and derail the manifestation speech of Senator Risa Hontiveros. In the video, Villanueva stated to Marcos, "Go to the microphone. Say that the point of order takes precedence. Para tumigil sya (transl. so she will stop talking – referring to Hontiveros)." Political experts note that the video seems to show a conspiracy of senators, namely Villanueva, Marcos, Ejercito, and Dela Rosa, attempting to cut off an incumbent senator's speech on impeachment procedure. Villanueva was among the 18 senators who voted to "return" the articles of impeachment to the House of Representatives. The return has been called "illegal" by various political and law experts.

=== 20th Congress ===
Upon the opening of the 20th Congress on July 28, 2025, Villanueva regained his title as the Senate majority floor leader, as Francis Tolentino was not re-elected in the May 2025 election. On September 9, 2025, a day after Tito Sotto replaced Francis Escudero as the Senate President, Villanueva became a Senate deputy minority floor leader, alongside Senator Rodante Marcoleta.

Following a Senate leadership coup on May 11, 2026, Villanueva voted to elect Alan Peter Cayetano as Senate President in the Senate President election. As a result, he relinquished his position as Deputy Minority Floor Leader and became part of the majority bloc as its acting leader until June 3. On June 17, Villanueva attended the special session and voted to elect Sherwin Gatchalian as the new Senate President, completing the required 13-vote quorum. He had previously been aligned with the Cayetano-led bloc, whose members boycotted the session and subsequently formed the new Senate minority bloc.

==== Flood control projects scandal ====
On September 9, 2025, Villanueva was alleged to have used ₱600 million for anomalous flood control projects in Balagtas, Bulacan, and received 30% or ₱150 million in kickbacks. The allegation was given by former Department of Public Works and Highways (DPWH) regional engineer Brice Hernandez during a House committee hearing on the Flood control projects corruption scandal. Two weeks later, Department of Justice Secretary Boying Remulla stated that the National Bureau of Investigation is set to file charges of indirect bribery and malversation against Villanueva and fellow senator Jinggoy Estrada. Joel's father, Jesus Is Lord Church founder Eddie Villanueva, using the name of God, afterwards threatened investigators and the public for investigating the alleged corrupt practices of his son.

== Sporting career ==
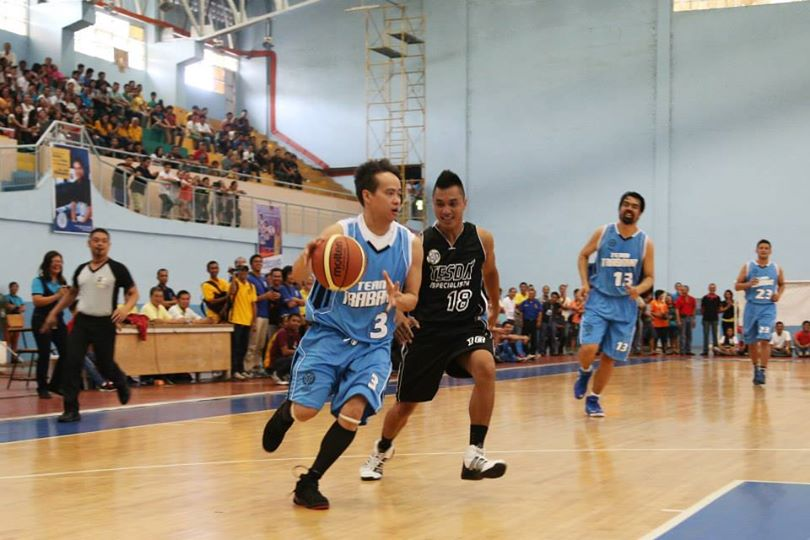
Villanueva playing for Team Trabaho as part of his "Shoot for your Dream" program

While he was a student at the University of Santo Tomas, Villanueva played with the UST Growling Tigers varsity basketball team, that won the UAAP Season 56 and 57 of 1994–1995. Villanueva was part of the Philippines national basketball team that competed in international basketball competitions such as the inaugural 1994 SEABA Championship (coached by Virgil Villavicencio).

He returned to competitive basketball in 2013, playing for the Congress-LGU Legislators in the UNTV Cup. In 2014, he played for the Malacañang Patriots. After winning a Senate seat, Villanueva joined the Senate Defenders basketball team, in preparations for the opening of Season 5 of the UNTV Cup. He was part of the Defenders' championship team that won the UNTV Cup season 6 in 2018.

== Personal life ==
Villanueva was given the Gawad Dangal ng Lipi for Public Service Award by the Bulacan provincial government on September 15, 2012. The Development Executive Group (DevEx) an organization based in the United States gave him the DEVEX Manila 40 Under 40 International Development Leaders Award on February 19, 2013. A former student of the University of Santo Tomas, he was named as Most Outstanding Alumni Award by the university. He was granted an Honoris Causa degree of Doctor of Humanities by the Polytechnic University of the Philippines on May 10, 2013.

Villanueva has two children, Jaden and Gwyn. As a basketball enthusiast, Villanueva is reportedly a fan of the Boston Celtics of the National Basketball Association. He formerly hosted the television program, Adyenda, and leads the Kristiyanong Kabataan para sa Bayan Movement, a youth organization.

Villanueva is a member of a political family. His father, Jesus Is Lord (JIL) founder Eddie Villanueva is a congressman representing CIBAC Party-list. His brother Jonjon is mayor of Bocaue in Bulacan and his sister Joni was the former mayor of Bocaue whose husband Sherwin Tugna is the incumbent vice mayor of Bocaue. The family has been described as an "obese dynasty". Addressing the critical label of "political dynasty" to the Villanuevas, his father Eddie Villanueva stated that the term is "not applicable" to them and that they are "here for advocacy".

== Electoral history ==
Electoral history of Joel Villanueva
Year	Office	Party	Votes received				Result
Year	Office	Party	Total	%	P.	Swing	Result
2001	Representative (Party-list)	CIBAC	323,810	4.96%	5th	—N/a	Won
2004	Representative (Party-list)	CIBAC	495,193	3.89%	6th	-1.07	Won
2007	Representative (Party-list)	CIBAC	755,735	4.72%	3rd	+0.83	Won
2016	Senator of the Philippines	Liberal	18,459,222	41.04%	2nd	—N/a	Won
2022	Senator of the Philippines	Independent	18,486,034	33.28%	9th	-7.76	Won
