= Juan Miguel Zubiri =

President of the Senate of the Philippines from 2022 to 2024 (born 1969)

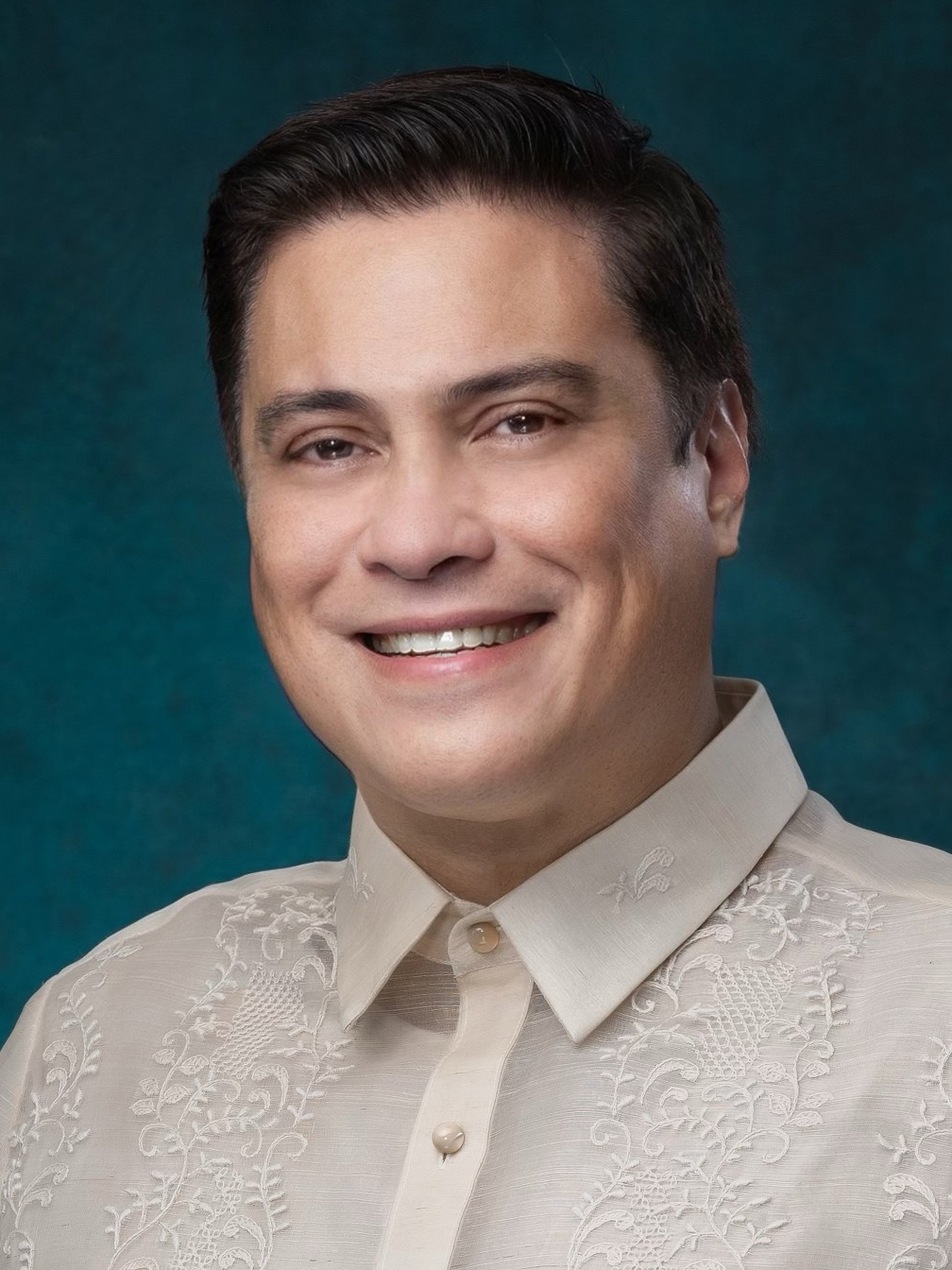
- Official portrait, 2022

30th President of the Senate of the Philippines
- In office July 25, 2022 – May 20, 2024
- Preceded by: Tito Sotto
- Succeeded by: Francis Escudero

Senate Majority Leader
- Incumbent
- Assumed office June 3, 2026
- Preceded by: Joel Villanueva (acting)
- In office September 8, 2025 – May 11, 2026
- Preceded by: Joel Villanueva
- Succeeded by: Joel Villanueva
- In office May 21, 2018 – June 30, 2022
- Preceded by: Tito Sotto
- Succeeded by: Joel Villanueva
- In office November 17, 2008 – June 30, 2010
- Preceded by: Francis Pangilinan
- Succeeded by: Tito Sotto

President pro tempore of the Senate of the Philippines
- Acting; June 30, 2022 – July 25, 2022
- Preceded by: Ralph Recto
- Succeeded by: Loren Legarda

Senate Deputy Minority Leader
- In office July 30, 2025 – September 8, 2025
- Leader: Tito Sotto
- Preceded by: Bam Aquino
- Succeeded by: Joel Villanueva

Senator of the Philippines
- Incumbent
- Assumed office June 30, 2016
- In office June 30, 2007 – August 3, 2011

Member of the Philippine House of Representatives from Bukidnon's 3rd district
- In office June 30, 1998 – June 30, 2007
- Preceded by: Jose Maria Zubiri Jr.
- Succeeded by: Jose Zubiri III

Personal details
- Born: Juan Miguel Fernandez Zubiri; April 13, 1969 (age 57) Makati, Rizal, Philippines
- Party: Independent (2011–present); BPP (local party; 2012–present)
- Other political affiliations: UNA (2012–2014); Lakas–Kampi–CMD (1998–2011); NPC (until 1998)
- Spouse: Audrey Tan (m. 2005)
- Children: 3
- Parent: Jose Maria Zubiri Jr. (father)
- Relatives: Jose Zubiri III (brother)
- Education: University of the Philippines Los Baños (BS); University of the Philippines Open University (MENRM)
- Occupation: Politician
- Profession: Businessman

Military service
- Allegiance: Philippines
- Branch/service: Armed Forces of the Philippines
- Years of service: 2024–present
- Rank: Lieutenant colonel (reserve)
- Sports career
- Country: Philippines
- Sport: Arnis
Medal record
Arnis
Representing Philippines
WEKAF World Championships
Gold medal – first place	1989 Cebu City

Juan Miguel "Migz" Fernandez Zubiri (Tagalog: [hwɐn miˈɡɛl pɛɾˈnɐndɛs sʊˈbɪɾi]; born April 13, 1969) is a Filipino politician who has served as Senate majority leader since June 2026, a position he previously held from 2008 to 2010, 2018 to 2022, and 2025 to 2026. An independent, he is in his third nonconsecutive term as a Senator of the Philippines, having been elected in 2016 and previously serving from 2007 until his resignation in 2011. During his Senate tenure, he served as the 30th senate president of the Philippines from 2022 to 2024.

The son of politician Jose Maria Zubiri Jr., he was educated at the University of the Philippines Los Baños. Zubiri worked as the chief of staff for his father during his tenure in the House of Representatives and succeeded him as the representative of Bukidnon's third district in 1998, holding that position until 2007. As a representative, he was part of the "Spice Boys" who opposed the administration of Joseph Estrada and played an active role in Estrada's removal from office in 2001.

Zubiri was first elected to the Senate in the 2007 elections, placing twelfth. His victory was later subject to an electoral protest filed by Koko Pimentel, which cited allegations of electoral fraud in Maguindanao. While he continued to deny the charges, Zubiri resigned from the Senate in August 2011, citing the personal impact of the allegations. He would unsuccessfully run for the Senate in the 2013 election before being elected back in 2016.

== Early life ==
Juan Miguel Fernandez Zubiri was born on April 13, 1969, in Makati, Philippines, to a Negrense father of Spanish Basque heritage, Jose Maria Rubin Zubiri Jr. from Kabankalan in the province of Negros Occidental and a mother, Maria Victoria Ocampo Fernandez of Libon, Albay, who was raised in Bukidnon in Northern Mindanao. He speaks Cebuano, Tagalog, English, and his father's native Hiligaynon. His father, Jose Maria, is a former governor of Bukidnon.

In his early years, Zubiri resided in Alabang, Muntinlupa. He finished his elementary and high school education at the Colegio San Agustin-Makati, and graduated with a Bachelor of Science in Agribusiness Management from the University of the Philippines Los Baños. Zubiri also dabbled in modelling in his younger years, appearing in some TV ads. He also earned a Master of Environment and Natural Resources Management degree from the University of the Philippines Open University.

== Sports career ==
Zubiri is involved in Arnis as a former player and sports executive. Zubiri began training for Arnis, a martial art and the national sport of the Philippines, at the age of sixteen. He won the Arnis World Championship title in 1989, defeating Jeff Finder of the United States.

He would be elected as the inaugural president and chairman of the Philippine Eskrima Kali Arnis Federation (PEKAF). The organization established in 2017 would become the national sports association for the sport of Arnis in the Philippines as an affiliate member of the Philippine Olympic Committee.

== House of Representatives (1998–2007) ==
After serving as chief of staff of his father, Representative Jose Maria Zubiri, Jr., from 1995 to 1998, he ran for the seat representing the third district of Bukidnon to be vacated by his father, who was term-limited in the 1998 elections. Winning easily in that election, he served his first term in the 10th Congress. During his first term, he was one of the members of what the media dubbed as the "Spice Boys", a group of neophyte and two-term congressmen who were openly critical of President Joseph Estrada's administration. He was subsequently re-elected to the Philippine House of Representatives in the 2001 and 2004 elections.

As congressman, Zubiri was against the repeal of capital punishment, with him leading the Spice Boys in filing a House resolution in 2002 supporting the "full implementation of the law on the death penalty to deter crime."

== First Senate stint (2007–2011) ==
=== Election ===
After serving as a representative for three terms, Lakas drafted him to be one of their candidates in the pro-Gloria Macapagal Arroyo administration TEAM Unity ticket for the 2007 mid-term elections.

In the final tally for the 2007 senatorial race by the Philippine Commission on Elections (Comelec), Rep. Zubiri narrowly defeated opposition candidate Koko Pimentel for the 12th and last slot in the Senate. Zubiri had a total of 11,001,730 votes against Pimentel's 10,983,358 votes. The margin of some 18,372 votes was strongly contested, particularly the votes from the southern Philippine province of Maguindanao, where Pimentel had lost to Zubiri by a landslide.

Claiming that the votes in Maguindanao were tainted, Pimentel petitioned the Philippine Supreme Court to invalidate the votes from Maguindanao, effectively disenfranchising a whole province. The Supreme Court voted unanimously 14 -0 against Pimentel and allowed the COMELEC (Commission on Elections) to count the votes in Zubiri's favor. Pimentel then returned to the Supreme Court for a second time. This time, he petitioned the justices to issue a restraining order against the proclamation of Zubiri. After oral arguments, however, the High Tribunal again voted to uphold the COMELEC's decision to proclaim Zubiri, consequently failing to grant Pimentel's petition. The next day, July 14, 2007, Zubiri was duly proclaimed elected to the Philippine Senate. However, the Court's judgment did not prevent Pimentel from bringing his poll protests to the Senate Electoral Tribunal.

On March 14, 2008, the Supreme Court, in a 40-page decision penned by Associate Justice Minita Chico-Nazario, dismissed Koko Pimentel's petition to stop the Commission on Elections from canvassing votes from the province of Maguindanao, a definite morale booster for Senator Zubiri.

=== Tenure ===
While serving his stint in the Senate, Zubiri began advocating a more in-depth study of biofuels in order to prevent food shortages, all the while allowing current production of alternative clean energy and biofuels so as to lessen dependence on imported oil and allow the Philippine economy a new avenue of economic success, "especially in this day and age of constant rising oil prices". In the 14th Congress, he became the Majority Leader, replacing Senator Kiko Pangilinan on November 17, 2008. During his Majority Leadership, the Senate passed a record 650 bills.

=== Resignation and aftermath ===
On August 3, 2011, however, during his privilege speech on the floor in the Philippine Senate, Zubiri suddenly announced his resignation from the body. In his speech, Zubiri expressed how his family was affected by the accusations against him. He also denied any wrongdoing and stating that he was falsely accused of electoral fraud. He also mentioned the negative impact of the accusations on his family and the start of a trial by publicity. His resignation marked a first in Senate history, as other senators who left the Senate did so in order to take up another post in public office.

His resignation was lauded by Malacañang and various sectors, but was also seen as a step that helped restore the Filipino's faith in national electoral protests. Senator Kiko Pangilinan, a member of the Senate Electoral Tribunal, likewise refused to comment on what the next procedure is for the vacancy left by Zubiri.

== Return to the Senate (2016–present) ==
=== Elections ===
In 2013, Zubiri ran for the Senate under the opposition United Nationalist Alliance ticket but lost, placing 14th out of the 12 seats with 11,821,134 votes.

In 2016, he ran again for the Senate as an independent candidate. Zubiri was adopted by various political parties who considered his popularity among voters of various age and social groups. With 16 million votes, he placed sixth in the polls, making him successful this time.

=== Tenure ===
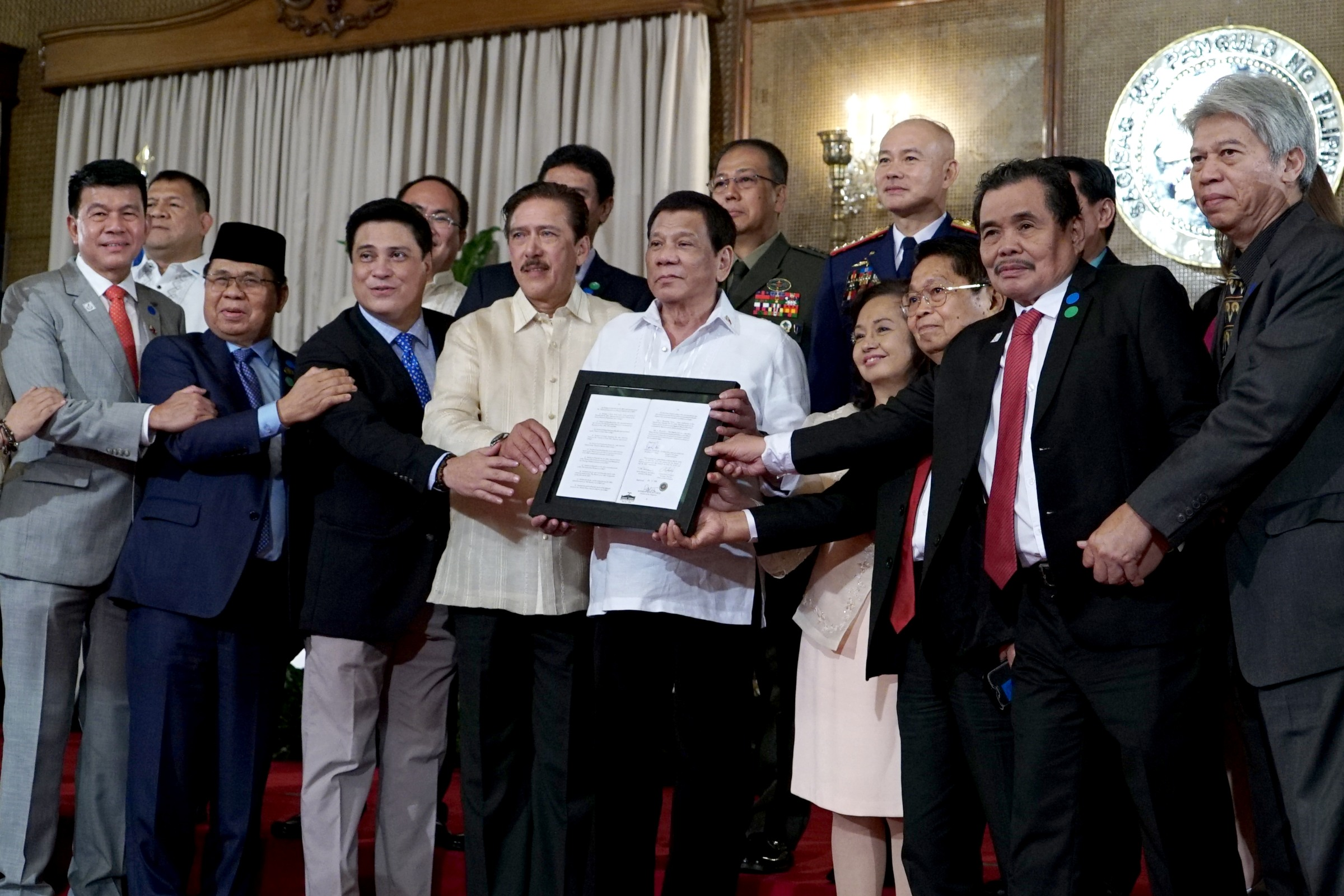
Senator Zubiri (foreground, 3rd from left) with President Rodrigo Duterte during the Bangsamoro Organic Law presentation to the MILF in August 2018

In the 17th Congress, he was once again elected as Senate Majority Leader on May 21, 2018, succeeding Tito Sotto, who was elected Senate President.

In 2022, Zubiri successfully defended his seat. Running as an independent candidate with the support of the UniTeam Alliance (which supported Bongbong Marcos in the concurrent presidential election), the MP3 Coalition (which supported Manny Pacquiao for president), and previously TRoPa (which supported Leni Robredo for president), he received nearly 19 million votes, finishing eighth out of twelve successful candidates.

=== Senate President (2022–2024) ===
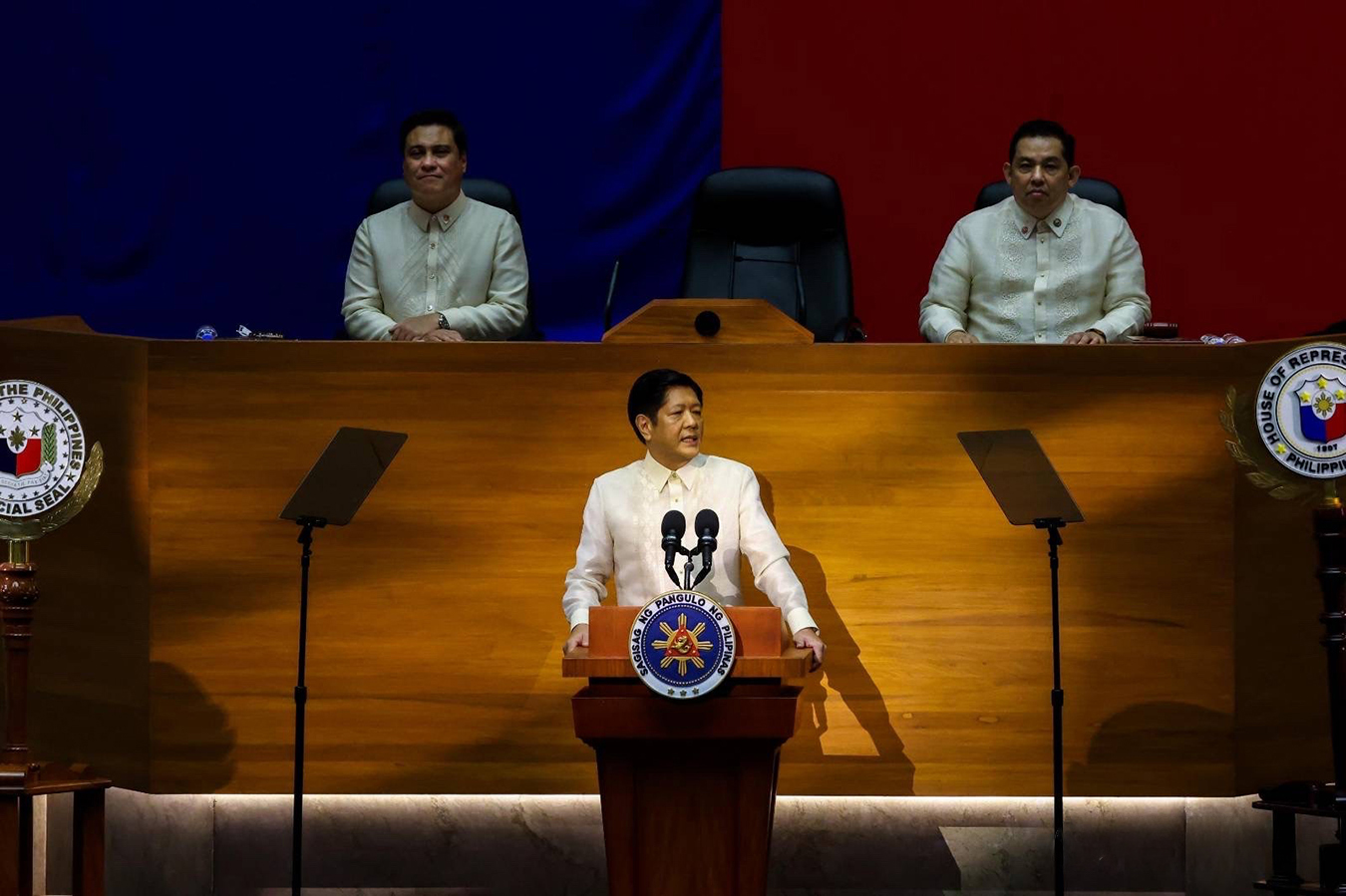
Zubiri (top left) during President Bongbong Marcos's 2022 State of the Nation Address.

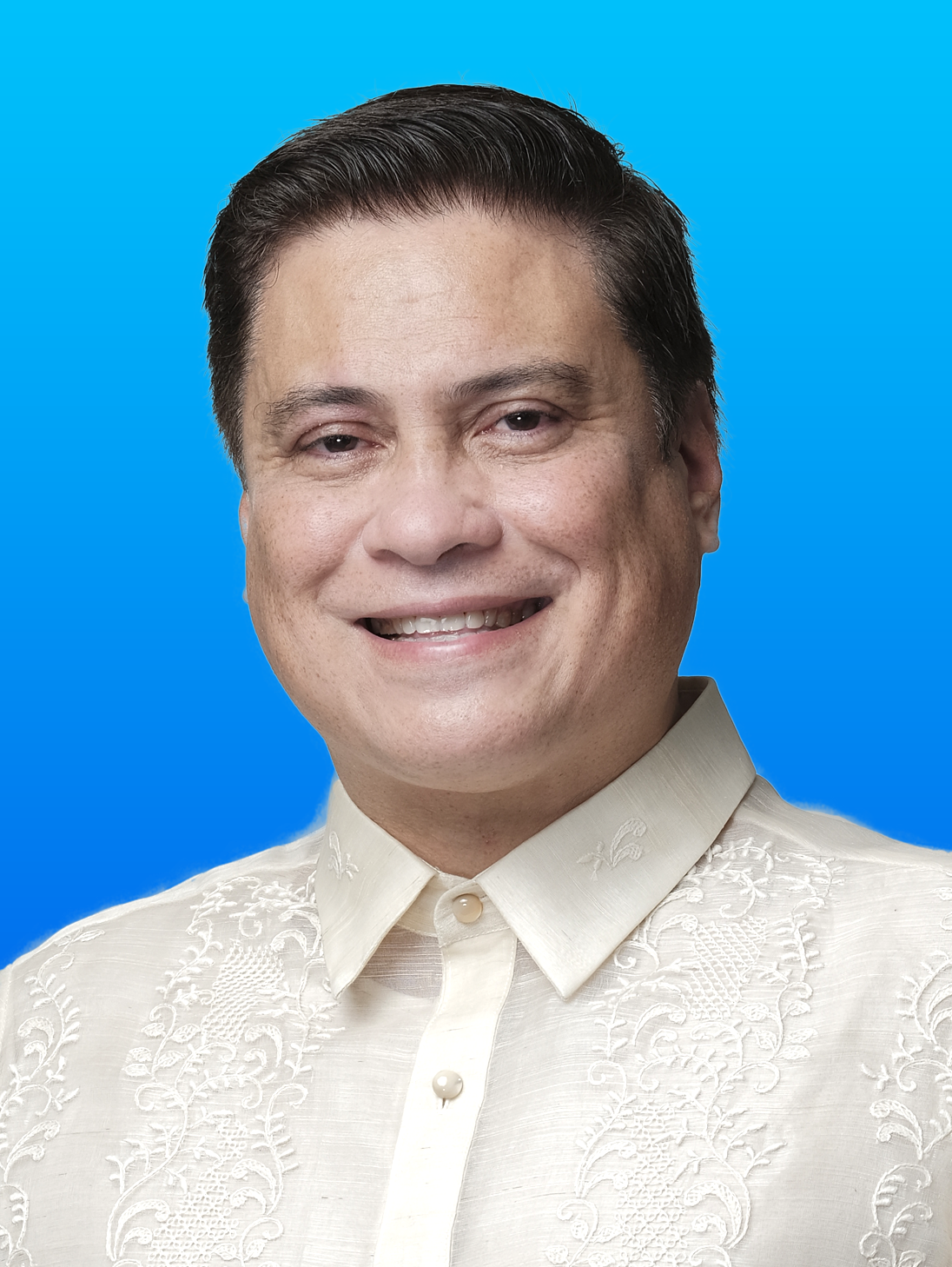
Zubiri's Commission on Appointments portrait for the 19th Congress

In late May 2022, he announced his candidacy for the position of President of the Senate, to succeed Tito Sotto, who was retiring. On June 1, Cynthia Villar, who was considered his main rival, withdrew from the race and endorsed him for the ballot scheduled to be held in late July. On the same day, he was elected President pro tempore, the second most senior position in the Senate, to fill out the remaining few weeks of the term of Ralph Recto, who had vacated the post to take up a seat in the House of Representatives. On July 25, 2022, Zubiri, being the only nominee for the post, was elected as Senate President.

On May 20, 2024, Zubiri resigned as Senate President and was abruptly succeeded by Senator Francis Escudero. It was revealed that 15 senators voted to oust Zubiri as Senate President, while seven senators voted to retain him, and the two-member minority bloc abstained. In his farewell address, Zubiri emphasized his support for the independence of his colleagues and attributed his departure to not following higher authorities' instructions, stating his commitment to the Senate's integrity.

Describing himself as a conservative lawyer, Zubiri opposed the Adolescent Pregnancy Prevention Bill believing its comprehensive sex education would encourage early sexual exploration among children.

=== 20th Congress (2025–2028) ===
Upon the opening of the 20th Congress in July 2025, Zubiri was named as a deputy minority leader by returning Senator Tito Sotto, who was elected as the new Minority Floor Leader. Following the election of Sotto as Senate President on September 8, 2025, he was named as the Majority Floor Leader, replacing Joel Villanueva. On May 11, 2026, he voted to abstain in the Senate President election that saw Alan Peter Cayetano installed as Senate President. As a result, he relinquished his position as Majority Floor Leader and became part of the independent bloc. He regained the position of Majority Floor Leader of 3 June 2026, upon the election of Sherwin Gatchalian as Senate President Pro Tempore and Acting Senate President. He continued to serve as Majority Floor Leader upon the election of Gatchalian as Senate President on 17 June 2026.

== Views ==
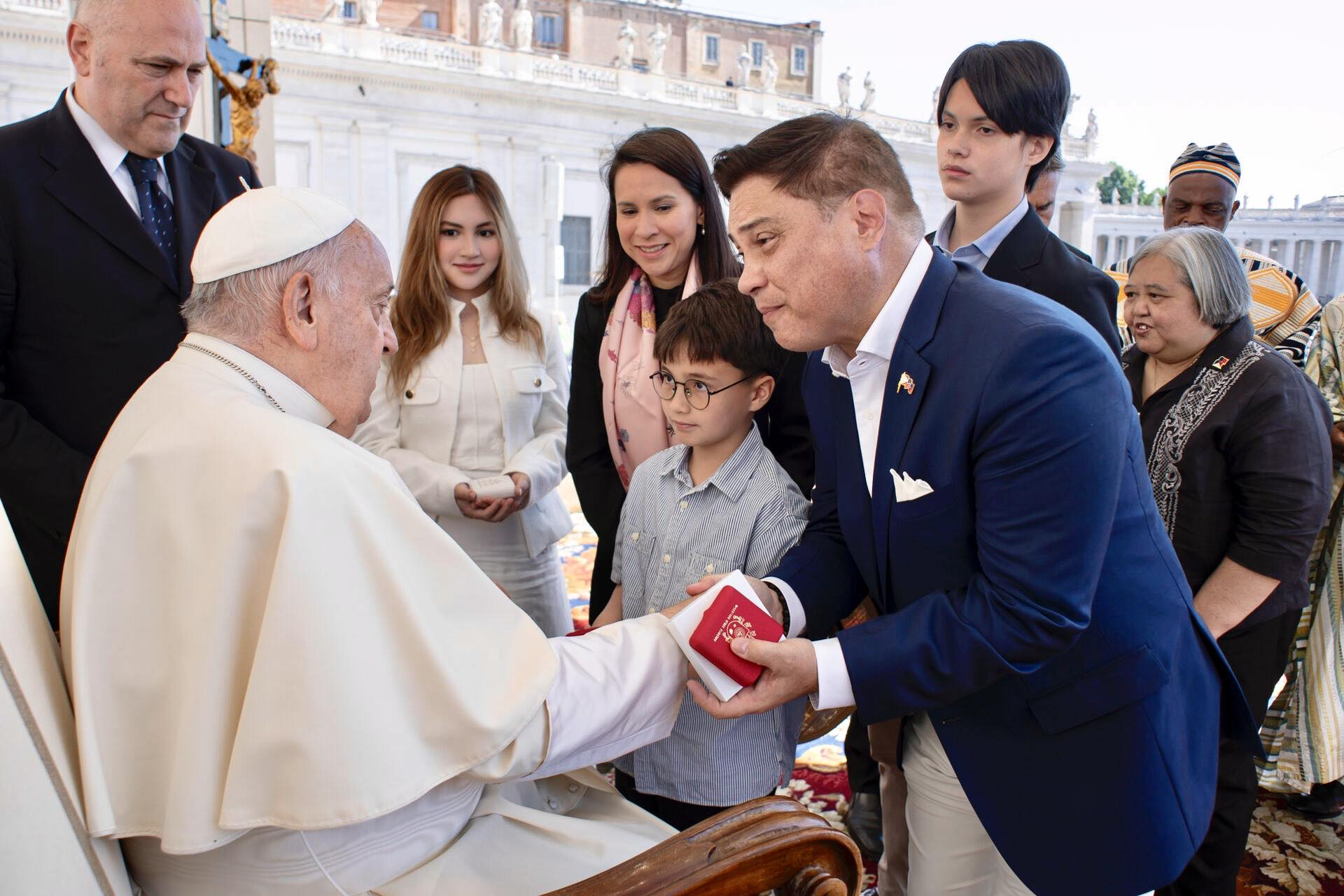
Zubiri and his family meet Pope Francis at St. Peter's Square, Vatican City in 2024

Zubiri, a Roman Catholic, has described himself as "a pro-life and pro-family legislator", with "a strong belief in the sanctity and insolubility of marriage". Although he had previously expressed strong support for the death penalty as congressman ("Some should die, so that others may live," he once said in 2002), he later expressed a more reserved view on its reinstatement, voting against it in 2017 and stating that further reforms to the country's justice system should be prioritized before returning it to law.

Following a meeting with Pope Francis in June 2024, Zubiri said that the pontiff left him a mandate to "protect the Filipino family".

== Ancestry ==
Ancestors of Migz Zubiri

4. Jose Zubiri, Sr.
2. Jose Maria Zubiri, Jr.
5. Rosa Rubin
1. Migz Zubiri
24. Manuel Fernandez
12. Bartolome Fernandez
25. Mamerta Seda
6. Manuel Fernandez
26. Ignacio Calleja
13. Pilar Calleja
27. Aquilina Maronilla
3. Maria Victoria Fernandez
28. ? Ocampo; (first name unidentified)
14. Jesús Ocampo
29. ?; (first and last name unidentified)
7. Rosita Ocampo
15. Rosenda Villaroman

== Personal life ==
Zubiri is married to Audrey Tan since 2005 and they have three children. He is the current chairman of the Philippine Eskrima Kali Arnis Federation and the vice chairman of the Philippine Red Cross.

Zubiri is a reserve officer in the Armed Forces of the Philippines with the rank of lieutenant colonel since April 8, 2024.

== Electoral history ==
Electoral history of Juan Miguel Zubiri
Year	Office	Party	Votes received				Result
Year	Office	Party	Total	%	P.	Swing	Result
1998	Representative (Bukidnon–3rd)	Lakas	89,683	81.40%	1st	—N/a	Won
2001	Representative (Bukidnon–3rd)	Lakas	—N/a	—N/a	1st	—N/a	Won
2004	Representative (Bukidnon–3rd)	Lakas	—N/a	—N/a	1st	—N/a	Won
2007	Senator of the Philippines	Lakas	11,005,866	37.31%	12th	—N/a	Won
2013	Senator of the Philippines	UNA	11,821,134	29.45%	14th	−7.86	Lost
2016	Senator of the Philippines	Independent	16,119,165	35.84%	6th	+6.39	Won
2022	Senator of the Philippines	Independent	18,734,336	33.73%	8th	−2.11	Won

== Honours ==
- Grand Cordon of the Order of the Rising Sun (2025)
- 2026 National Book Award for Best Book on Professions for his book The Road to Peace: Crafting the Bangsamoro Organic Law

Political offices
House of Representatives of the Philippines
Preceded by Jose Maria Zubiri Jr.	Member of the House of Representatives from Bukidnon's 3rd district 1998–2007	Succeeded by Jose Maria Zubiri III
Senate of the Philippines
Preceded by Francis Pangilinan	Majority leader of the Senate of the Philippines; 2008–2010	Succeeded by Tito Sotto
Preceded by Bam Aquino as Chair of Senate Trade and Commerce Committee	Chair of the Senate Trade, Commerce and Entrepreneurship Committee; 2016–2018	Succeeded by Aquilino Pimentel III
Preceded by Lito Lapid	Chair of the Senate Cooperatives Committee; 2016–2022	Succeeded by Imee Marcos
Preceded by Tito Sotto	Majority leader of the Senate of the Philippines; 2018–2022	Succeeded by Joel Villanueva
Preceded by Ralph Recto	President pro tempore of the Senate of the Philippines; Acting; 2022	Succeeded by Loren Legarda
Preceded by Tito Sotto	President of the Senate of the Philippines; 2022–2024	Succeeded by Francis Escudero
Preceded by Joel Villanueva	Majority leader of the Senate of the Philippines; 2025–2026	Succeeded by Joel Villanueva
Preceded by Joel Villanueva	Majority leader of the Senate of the Philippines; 2026–present	Incumbent
