= Majority Floor Leader of the Senate of the Philippines =

Political position

- Lider ng Mayorya ng Senado ng Pilipinas
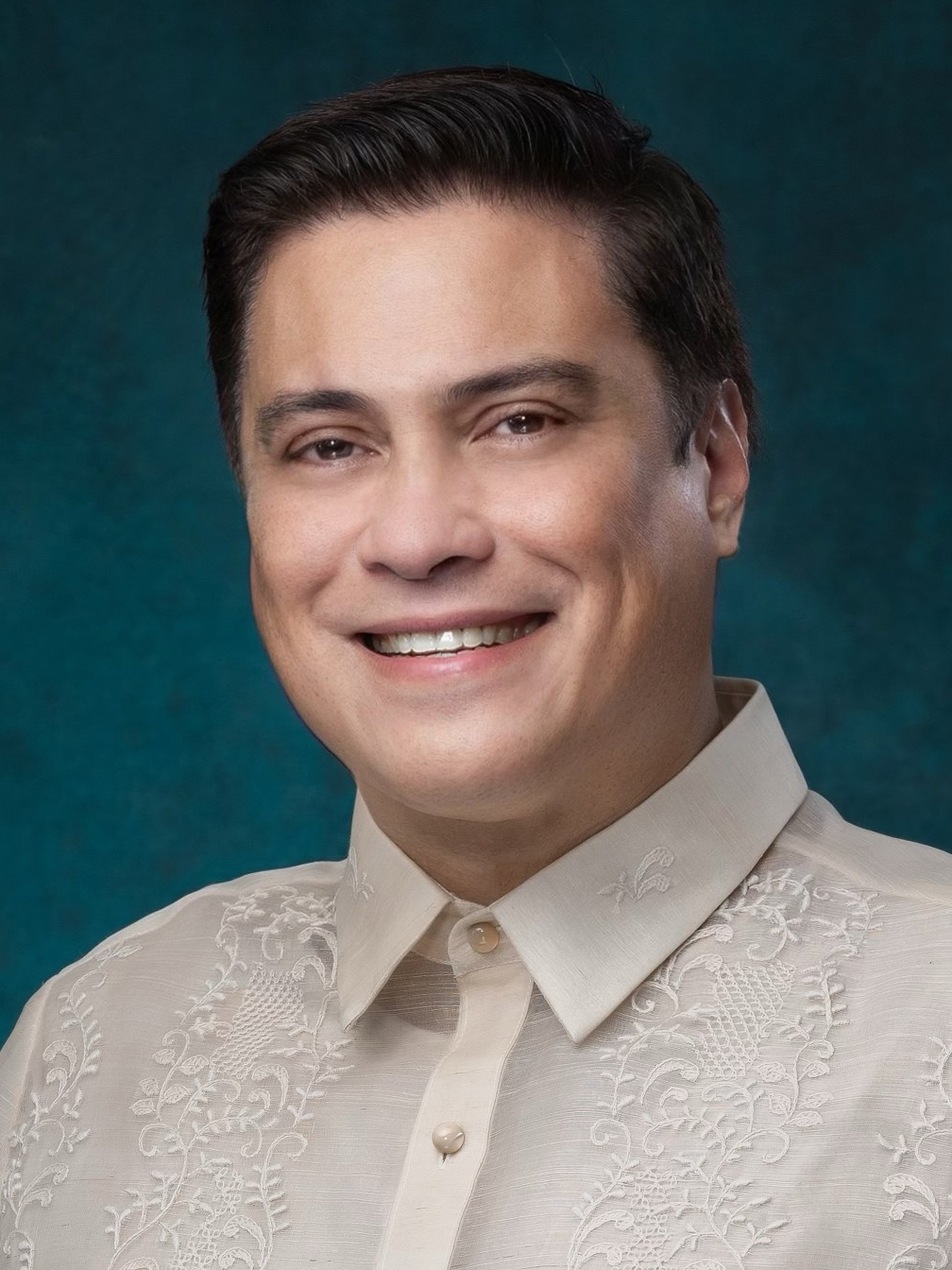
- Incumbent; Juan Miguel Zubiri since June 3, 2026
- Style: The Honorable (Diplomatic)
- Appointer: Elected by the Senate of the Philippines
- Inaugural holder: Francisco Felipe Villanueva
- Formation: October 16, 1916
- Deputy: Deputy Majority Floor Leader of the Senate of the Philippines

The majority floor leader of the Senate of the Philippines (Filipino: Lider ng Mayorya ng Senado ng Pilipinas), or simply the Senate majority floor leader, is the leader elected by the political party or coalition of parties that holds the majority in the Senate of the Philippines.

By tradition, the Senate president or any presiding officer gives the majority leader priority in obtaining the floor and is also the traditional chairman of the Committee on Rules. The majority leader also manages the business of the majority bloc in the Senate.

The current Senate majority floor leader is Juan Miguel Zubiri.

== History ==
=== 1910s–1990s ===
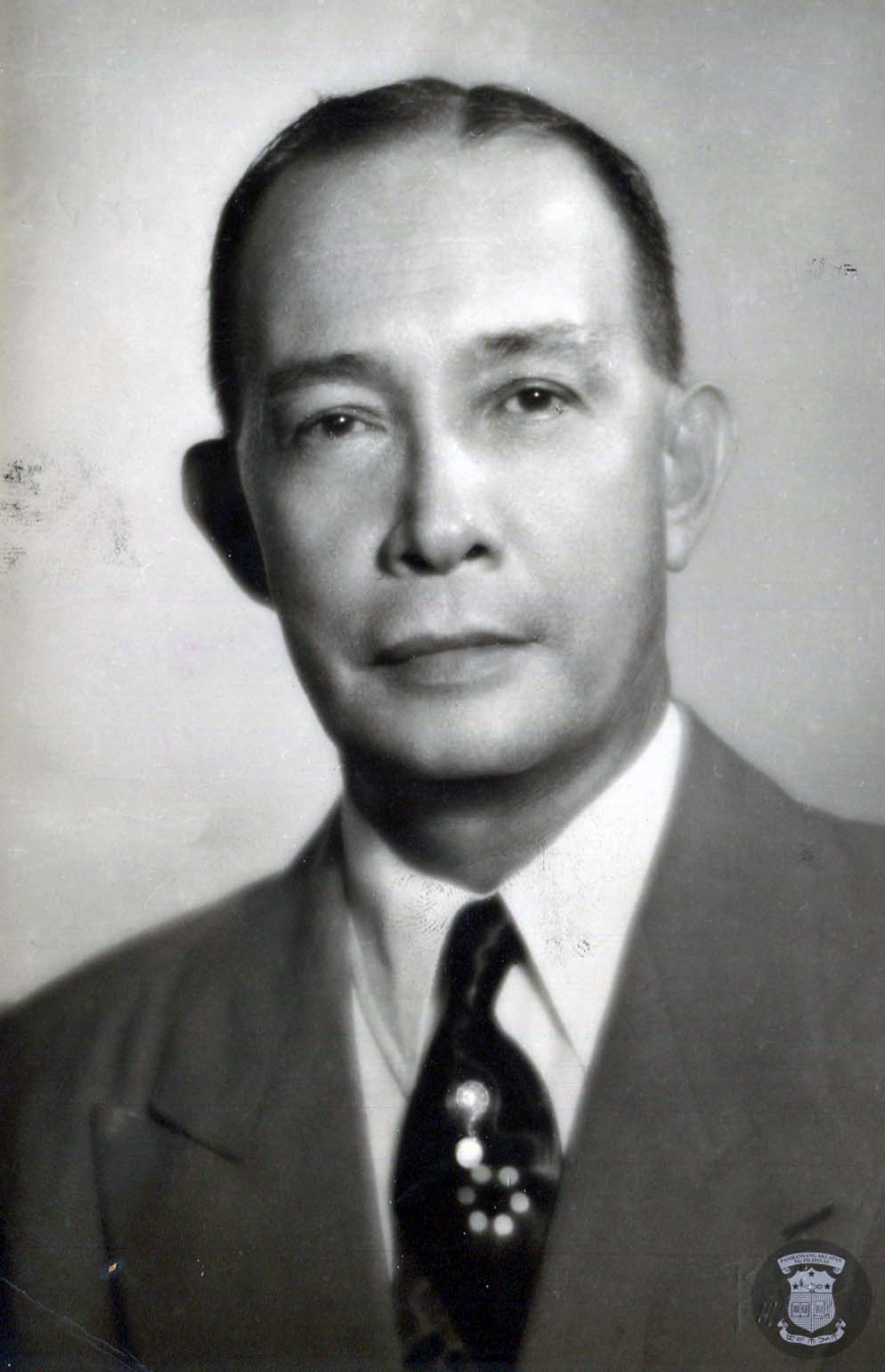
Cipriano Primicias Sr. is the longest-serving majority floor leader in Senate history.

The position of floor leader representing the chamber as a whole was created in 1916 upon the establishment of the Philippine Senate. Francisco Felipe Villanueva of the Nacionalista Party was elected as the Senate’s first floor leader. From then until the first abolition of the Senate in 1935, the Nacionalista Party emerged as the ruling party in Congress, establishing a virtually dominant-party system in the Philippines. In 1931, Claro M. Recto became the lone minority member after distancing himself from his Nacionalista partymates, thus becoming the minority leader and creating the distinction of a majority floor leader. Benigno Aquino Sr. was the first senator elected to the role in this capacity, leading the majority bloc. Recto, previously a member of the Democrata Party, rejoined the Senate majority after switching to the Nacionalista Party by 1934 and was elected floor leader.

By the 1st Congress, after several Nacionalista members led by Manuel Roxas broke away from the party to run under its liberal wing for the 1946 elections, which later established the Liberal Party, a form of the two-party system emerged. Vicente Francisco led the Liberal majority bloc after the party won 9 of the 16 contested seats in the first postwar Senate election. The Nacionalistas regained their majority in the 3rd Congress, led by Cipriano Primicias Sr. as floor leader. He is the longest-serving Senate majority floor leader in history, with a total uninterrupted tenure of 7 years and 339 days. Arturo Tolentino served as the last majority floor leader of the Senate from 1970 until 1972, when the chamber was dissolved following president Ferdinand Marcos’s declaration of martial law.

The Senate was reestablished under the 1987 Constitution. Orlando Mercado became the leader of the majority bloc, now composed of multiple political parties forming an internal alliance rather than functioning as standalone parties. Teofisto Guingona Jr. succeeded Mercado in 1990, until he was replaced by Laban ng Demokratikong Pilipino (LDP) senator Alberto Romulo at the fifth regular session of the 8th Congress. The LDP became the majority party in the Senate by 1992, with member Francisco Tatad serving as majority leader from 1996. A coup ousted incumbent Senate president Ernesto Maceda in 1998, installing Neptali Gonzales in the position and Lakas–NUCD–UMDP senator Franklin Drilon as majority leader.

=== 2000s–present ===
Tatad was reelected to the position in 2000 under Drilon’s Senate presidency. Loren Legarda became the first and only woman senator elected as majority floor leader in 2001. Legarda left the majority in 2004 after allying with the opposition coalition Koalisyon ng Nagkakaisang Pilipino for her vice presidential bid against president Gloria Macapagal Arroyo’s running mate, senator Noli de Castro, and was replaced by Francis Pangilinan. The election of Juan Ponce Enrile as Senate president in November 2008 saw Pangilinan replaced by Juan Miguel Zubiri as majority leader, the youngest to be elected in Senate history. In the 15th Congress, Tito Sotto was elected to the position. He was notable for chairing the Committee on Rules which drafted the Senate’s rules on impeachment proceedings used during the trial of chief justice Renato Corona. Alan Peter Cayetano led the Senate majority in the 16th Congress, with Sotto returning to the position in 2016 until his election as Senate president in 2018 following a term-sharing agreement with Koko Pimentel.

Juan Miguel Zubiri was reelected as majority floor leader after eight years in 2018, becoming the first independent senator to serve in the position, and held the post until his election as Senate president at the start of the 19th Congress. Joel Villanueva then became Zubiri’s majority floor leader in 2022, resigning in 2024 when Zubiri stepped down as Senate president and was succeeded by Francis Escudero. Francis Tolentino subsequently served as the new majority leader until the end of his senatorial term in 2025. Villanueva aligned himself with Escudero’s majority after his reelection as Senate president, becoming majority leader at the start of the 20th Congress. Zubiri, who had previously served as majority leader during Tito Sotto’s first tenure as Senate president, reassumed the position on September 8, 2025, after Sotto was reelected to the Senate presidency following a leadership coup. Villanueva was designated as the acting majority leader after the 2026 leadership coup ousting Sotto as Senate president and installing Alan Peter Cayetano in the position.

Zubiri was re-elected as majority floor leader on June 3, 2026, following a session attended by the Senate minority bloc and Senator Francis Escudero was called to order, and all elective positions were declared vacant.

== List of majority floor leaders ==
| No. | Portrait | Name (Birth–Death) | Term of office | | Party | Legislature |
| No. | Portrait | Name (Birth–Death) | Took office | Left office | Party | Legislature |
|---|---|---|---|---|---|---|
| 1 | | Francisco Felipe Villanueva; Senator for the 7th District (1867–1923) | October 16, 1916 | June 3, 1919 | Nacionalista | 4th Legislature |
| 2 | | Francisco Enage; Senator for the 9th District (1878–1958) | June 3, 1919 | June 2, 1925 | Nacionalista (until 1922) | 5th Legislature |
| 2 | | Francisco Enage; Senator for the 9th District (1878–1958) | June 3, 1919 | June 2, 1925 | Nacionalista Colectivista (from 1922) | 6th Legislature |
| 3 | | Jose P. Laurel; Senator for the 5th District (1891–1959) | June 2, 1925 | June 2, 1931 | Nacionalista Consolidado | 7th Legislature |
| 3 | | Jose P. Laurel; Senator for the 5th District (1891–1959) | June 2, 1925 | June 2, 1931 | Nacionalista Consolidado | 8th Legislature |
| 4 | | Benigno Aquino Sr. Senator for the 3rd District (1894–1947) | July 16, 1931 | June 5, 1934 | Nacionalista Consolidado | 9th Legislature |
| 5 | | Claro M. Recto; Senator for the 5th District (1890–1960) | July 16, 1934 | November 15, 1935 | Nacionalista Democratico | 10th Legislature |
Senate abolished (November 15, 1935 – June 9, 1945)
| 6 | | Melecio Arranz (1888–1966) | June 9, 1945 | May 25, 1946 | Nacionalista | 1st Commonwealth Congress |
| 7 | | Vicente Francisco (1891–1974) | May 25, 1946 | February 21, 1949 | Liberal | 2nd Commonwealth Congress |
| 7 | | Vicente Francisco (1891–1974) | May 25, 1946 | February 21, 1949 | Liberal | 1st Congress |
| 8 | | Tomas Cabili (1903–1957) | February 21, 1949 | December 30, 1953 | Liberal | 1st Congress |
| 8 | | Tomas Cabili (1903–1957) | February 21, 1949 | December 30, 1953 | Liberal | 2nd Congress |
| 9 | | Cipriano Primicias Sr. (1901–1965) | January 25, 1954 | December 30, 1961 | Nacionalista | 3rd Congress |
| 9 | | Cipriano Primicias Sr. (1901–1965) | January 25, 1954 | December 30, 1961 | Nacionalista | 4th Congress |
| 10 | | Arturo Tolentino (1910–2004) | January 22, 1962 | December 30, 1965 | Nacionalista | 5th Congress |
| 11 | | Jose Roy (1904–1986) | January 17, 1966 | January 26, 1967 | Nacionalista | 6th Congress |
| 12 | | Rodolfo Ganzon (1922–2003) | January 26, 1967 | December 30, 1969 | Nacionalista | 6th Congress |
| 13 | | Arturo Tolentino (1910–2004) | January 26, 1970 | January 17, 1973 | Nacionalista | 7th Congress |
Senate abolished (Note: The ratification of the 1973 Constitution abolished the Senate, and a unicameral legislature was established, later known as the Batasang Pambansa.) (January 17, 1973 – February 2, 1987)
| 14 | | Orly Mercado (born 1946) | July 27, 1987 | July 23, 1990 | Liberal | 8th Congress |
| 15 | | Teofisto Guingona Jr. (born 1928) | July 23, 1990 | July 22, 1991 | Liberal | 8th Congress |
| 16 | | Alberto Romulo (born 1933) | July 22, 1991 | October 10, 1996 | LDP | 8th Congress |
| 16 | | Alberto Romulo (born 1933) | July 22, 1991 | October 10, 1996 | LDP | 9th Congress |
| 17 | | Francisco Tatad (born 1939) | October 10, 1996 | January 26, 1998 | LDP (until 1997) | 9th Congress |
| 17 | | Francisco Tatad (born 1939) | October 10, 1996 | January 26, 1998 | LDP (until 1997) | 10th Congress |
| 17 | | Francisco Tatad (born 1939) | October 10, 1996 | January 26, 1998 | Gabay Bayan (from 1997) | 10th Congress |
| 18 | | Franklin Drilon (born 1945) | January 26, 1998 | April 12, 2000 | Lakas (until 1998) | 10th Congress |
| 18 | | Franklin Drilon (born 1945) | January 26, 1998 | April 12, 2000 | LAMMP (from 1998) | 11th Congress |
| 19 | | Francisco Tatad (born 1939) | April 12, 2000 | June 30, 2001 | Gabay Bayan | 11th Congress |
| 20 | | Loren Legarda (born 1960) | July 23, 2001 | June 3, 2002 | Lakas | 12th Congress |
| 21 | | Nene Pimentel (1933–2019) | June 3, 2002 | July 23, 2002 | PDP–Laban | 12th Congress |
| 22 | | Loren Legarda (born 1960) | July 23, 2002 | January 12, 2004 | Lakas | 12th Congress |
| 23 | | Kiko Pangilinan (born 1963) | January 12, 2004 | November 17, 2008 | Liberal | 12th Congress |
| 23 | | Kiko Pangilinan (born 1963) | January 12, 2004 | November 17, 2008 | Liberal | 13th Congress |
| 23 | | Kiko Pangilinan (born 1963) | January 12, 2004 | November 17, 2008 | Liberal | 14th Congress |
| 24 | | Juan Miguel Zubiri (born 1969) | November 17, 2008 | June 30, 2010 | Lakas | 14th Congress |
| 25 | | Tito Sotto (born 1948) | July 26, 2010 | June 6, 2013 | NPC | 15th Congress |
| — | | Gregorio Honasan (born 1948); Acting | June 6, 2013 | July 22, 2013 | UNA | 15th Congress |
| 26 | | Alan Peter Cayetano (born 1970) | July 22, 2013 | June 30, 2016 | Nacionalista | 16th Congress |
| 27 | | Tito Sotto (born 1948) | July 25, 2016 | May 21, 2018 | NPC | 17th Congress |
| 28 | | Juan Miguel Zubiri (born 1969) | May 21, 2018 | June 29, 2022 | Independent | 17th Congress |
| 28 | | Juan Miguel Zubiri (born 1969) | May 21, 2018 | June 29, 2022 | Independent | 18th Congress |
| 29 | | Joel Villanueva (born 1975) | July 25, 2022 | May 20, 2024 | Independent | 19th Congress |
| 30 | | Francis Tolentino (born 1960) | May 20, 2024 | June 30, 2025 | PDP (until 2024) | 19th Congress |
| 30 | | Francis Tolentino (born 1960) | May 20, 2024 | June 30, 2025 | PFP (from 2024) | 19th Congress |
| 31 | | Joel Villanueva (born 1975) | July 28, 2025 | September 8, 2025 | Independent | 20th Congress |
| 32 | | Juan Miguel Zubiri (born 1969) | September 8, 2025 | May 11, 2026 | Independent | 20th Congress |
| — | | Joel Villanueva (born 1975); Acting | May 11, 2026 | June 3, 2026 | Independent | 20th Congress |
| 33 | | Juan Miguel Zubiri (born 1969) | June 3, 2026 | Incumbent | Independent | 20th Congress |

== Deputy Majority Floor Leader of the Senate of the Philippines ==
Beginning in the 19th Congress, two deputy majority leaders are elected to serve concurrently, assisting the majority leader in his duties, and assumes the latter's responsibilities when the majority leader is absent. JV Ejercito currently serves as senior deputy majority leader, while Joel Villanueva serves as deputy majority leader.

=== List of deputy majority floor leaders ===
| Officeholder 1 | | | | | Officeholder 2 | | | | | Legislature |
| Portrait | Name (Birth–Death) | Term of office | | Party | Portrait | Name (Birth–Death) | Term of office | | Party | Legislature |
| Portrait | Name (Birth–Death) | Took office | Left office | Party | Portrait | Name (Birth–Death) | Took office | Left office | Party | Legislature |
|---|---|---|---|---|---|---|---|---|---|---|
| | JV Ejercito (born 1969) | August 2, 2022 | May 20, 2024 | NPC | | Mark Villar (born 1978) | August 2, 2022 | May 20, 2024 | Nacionalista | 19th Congress |
| | Mark Villar (born 1978) | May 20, 2024 | July 23, 2024 | Nacionalista | Vacant (May 20, 2024 – July 23, 2024) | | | | | 19th Congress |
| | JV Ejercito (born 1969) | July 23, 2024 | May 11, 2026 | NPC | | Mark Villar (born 1978) | July 23, 2024 | June 30, 2025 | Nacionalista | 19th Congress |
| | JV Ejercito (born 1969) | July 23, 2024 | May 11, 2026 | NPC | | Rodante Marcoleta (born 1953) | July 30, 2025 | September 8, 2025 | Independent | 20th Congress |
| | JV Ejercito (born 1969) | July 23, 2024 | May 11, 2026 | NPC | | Risa Hontiveros (born 1966) | September 8, 2025 | May 11, 2026 | Akbayan | 20th Congress |
| Vacant (May 11 – June 17, 2026) | | | | | | | | | | 20th Congress |
| | JV Ejercito (born 1969) | June 17, 2026 | Incumbent | NPC | | Joel Villanueva (born 1975) | June 17, 2026 | Incumbent | Independent | 20th Congress |

== See also ==
- Minority Floor Leader of the Senate of the Philippines
