= Minority Floor Leader of the Senate of the Philippines =

Minority party's official senate leader

- Lider ng Minorya ng Senado ng Pilipinas
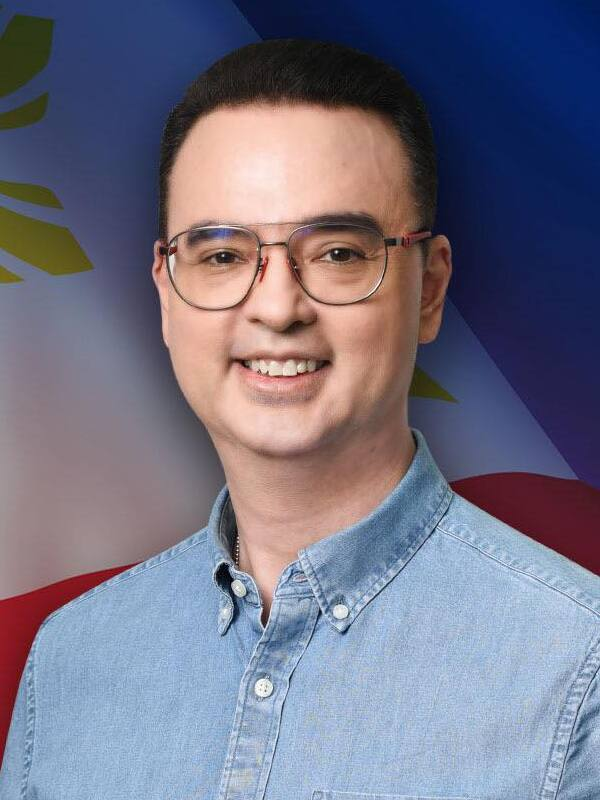
- Incumbent; Alan Peter Cayetano since June 17, 2026
- Style: The Honorable (formal)
- Appointer: Elected by the Senate of the Philippines
- Inaugural holder: Claro M. Recto
- Formation: 1931
- Deputy: Deputy Minority Floor Leader of the Senate

The minority floor leader of the Senate of the Philippines (Filipino: Lider ng Minorya ng Senado ng Pilipinas), or simply the Senate minority floor leader, is the leader elected by the political party or coalition of parties that are not part of the majority bloc in the Senate of the Philippines. The minority floor leader manages the business of the minority in the Senate, serving as its official leader in the body and fulfilling the responsibilities of a floor leader. Traditionally, the minority leader is expected to defend the bloc's parliamentary rights, criticize the policies and programs of the majority, and use parliamentary tactics to defeat, pass, or amend legislation.

The position is currently held by Alan Peter Cayetano.

== History ==
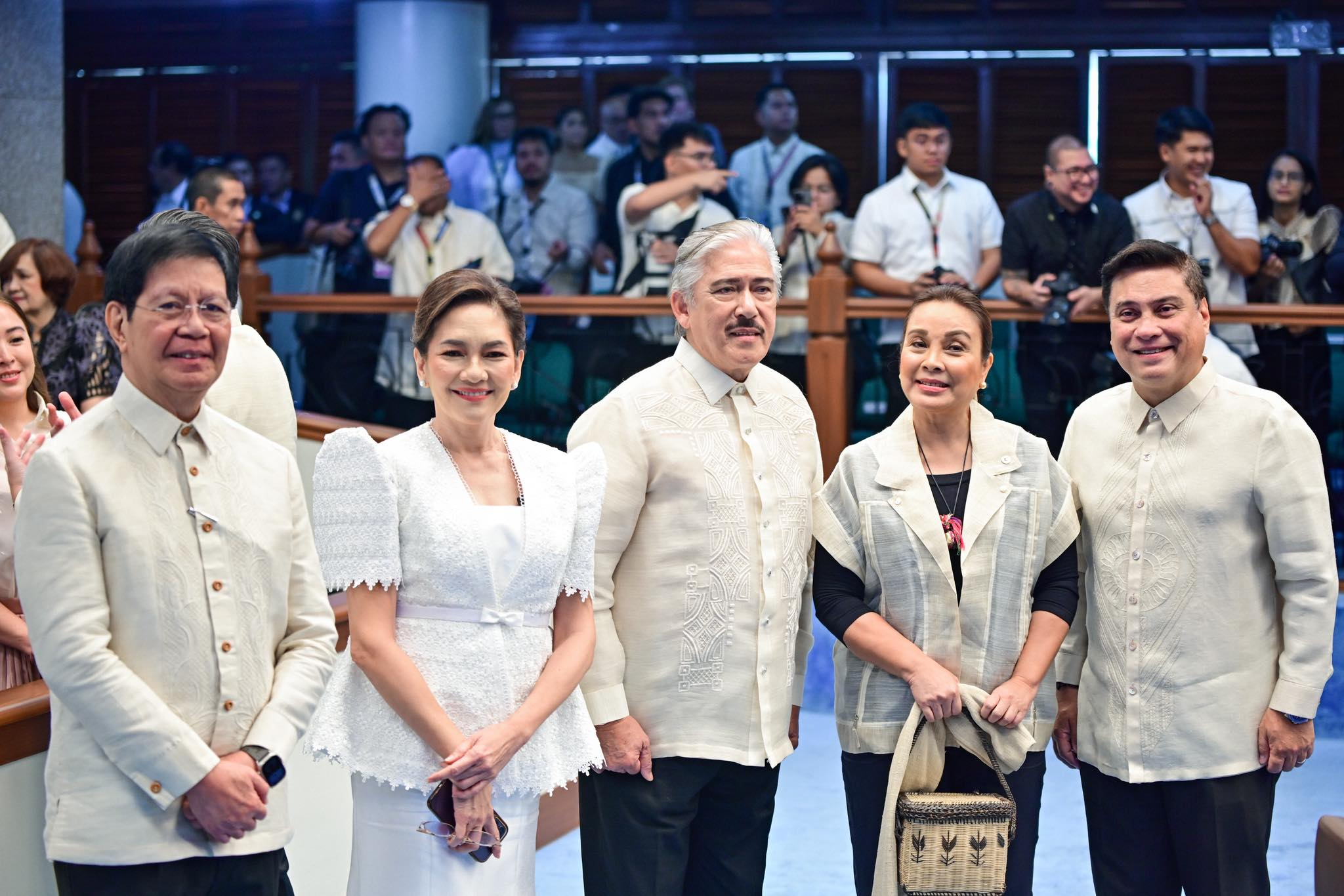
From left to right: the Veterans Bloc comprised Senators Panfilo Lacson, Risa Hontiveros, minority leader Tito Sotto, Loren Legarda, and Juan Miguel Zubiri during the opening session of the 20th Congress on July 28, 2025

=== 1930s–1990s ===
Prior to the emergence of the nominal two-party system in the late 1940s, the membership of the Senate from its establishment until its first abolition in 1935 operated under a virtually dominant-party system. The Nacionalista Party, headed by Senate president Manuel L. Quezon, held 18 out of 24 seats in the 9th Legislature, with the remaining seats belonging to four Democratas and one independent. Claro M. Recto became the first minority floor leader of the Senate and, at that time, the sole member of the minority, earning him the reputation of a “one-man fiscalizer.”

After the Liberal Party was established in 1946, it gained a majority of the seats in the Senate and elected its member Manuel Roxas as Senate president at the first session of the Second Commonwealth Congress (later known as the First Congress of the Philippines), with Carlos P. Garcia of the Nacionalista Party serving as the minority leader. Lorenzo Tañada of the Citizens' Party became the lone minority member, and in effect, the minority leader, during the 3rd Congress. Liberal senator Ambrosio Padilla served as minority leader from 1958 to 1960, and again from 1966 to 1969. Newly-elected senator Ferdinand Marcos became minority leader at the opening of the third regular session of the 4th Congress, and was succeeded by Estanislao Fernandez in 1962. Marcos was later elected Senate president the following year. Gerardo Roxas was the last Senate minority leader before the abolition of Congress following president Marcos’s declaration of martial law and the subsequent ratification of the 1973 Constitution.

The position was next held by Joseph Estrada in the reestablished Senate at the start of the 8th Congress after the 1986 EDSA Revolution. He served until August 1987, when Juan Ponce Enrile was proclaimed the 24th member of the Senate after winning an electoral protest filed by Augusto Sanchez, and thereafter became the minority leader after Estrada joined the majority bloc. After Jovito Salonga was ousted from the Senate presidency, fellow Liberal Wigberto Tañada served as minority leader until the end of his term in 1995. From this point onward, the losing candidate in the election for Senate president typically assumed the role of minority leader, as in the case of Edgardo Angara, who took the position after being unseated by Neptali Gonzales. Gonzales himself later became minority leader a year after his resignation from the Senate presidency and the election of Ernesto Maceda as Senate president. Gonzales served a third tenure as Senate president in January 1998, after which Maceda was designated as minority leader. Teofisto Guingona Jr. of Lakas–NUCD became minority leader upon the election of Senate president Marcelo Fernan, serving until his appointment as vice president by president Gloria Macapagal Arroyo in 2001. Rene Cayetano was elected minority leader on February 9, 2001, after Guingona's assumption of office as vice president, serving until the end of the 11th Congress.

=== 2000s–present ===
During president Joseph Estrada’s impeachment trial in early 2001, Aquilino Pimentel Jr. resigned as Senate president and subsequently served as minority leader. Tito Sotto succeeded Pimentel in 2002, while Pimentel again held the position during the 13th and 14th Congresses. Alan Peter Cayetano became the youngest senator to serve as minority leader in 2010, at the age of 39. Juan Ponce Enrile, who resigned the Senate presidency following corruption allegations related to the pork barrel scam, unsuccessfully sought the leadership of the Senate in the 16th Congress, lost to Franklin Drilon, and became minority leader. Sotto served as acting minority leader after Enrile stepped down in 2014, holding the position until 2015 when Enrile returned to the Senate following his one-year detention.

Ralph Recto was elected minority leader in the 17th Congress until his election as president pro tempore, after which he was succeeded by Franklin Drilon, who served until the end of the 18th Congress. Former Senate president Koko Pimentel led the two-member minority bloc alongside Risa Hontiveros in the 19th Congress. Tito Sotto was nominated for the Senate presidency upon his return to the chamber in 2025, but lost to incumbent Francis Escudero at the start of the 20th Congress. He once again served as minority leader until September 8, 2025, when a coup ousted Escudero and installed Sotto as Senate president. Escudero declined to assume the minority leadership, and Alan Peter Cayetano thereafter became the current minority floor leader of the Senate. The leadership coup on May 11, 2026 successfully installed Cayetano as the new Senate president, and Sotto was designated anew as the minority leader.

== List of minority floor leaders ==
No.	Portrait	Name (Birth–Death)	Term of office		Party	Legislature
No.	Portrait	Name (Birth–Death)	Took office	Left office	Party	Legislature
1		Claro M. Recto; Senator for the 5th District (1890–1960)	July 16, 1931	June 5, 1934	Democrata	9th Legislature
None (June 5, 1934 – November 15, 1935)						10th Legislature
Senate abolished (November 15, 1935 – June 9, 1945)
None (June 9, 1945 – May 25, 1946)						1st Commonwealth Congress
2		Carlos P. Garcia (1896–1971)	May 25, 1946	December 30, 1953	Nacionalista	2nd Commonwealth Congress
2		Carlos P. Garcia (1896–1971)	May 25, 1946	December 30, 1953	Nacionalista	1st Congress
2		Carlos P. Garcia (1896–1971)	May 25, 1946	December 30, 1953	Nacionalista	2nd Congress
3		Lorenzo Tañada (1898–1992)	January 25, 1954	December 30, 1957	Citizens'	3rd Congress
4		Ambrosio Padilla (1910–1996)	January 27, 1958	January 25, 1960	Liberal	4th Congress
5		Ferdinand Marcos (1917–1989)	January 25, 1960	December 30, 1961	Liberal	4th Congress
6		Estanislao Fernandez (1910–1982)	January 22, 1962	December 30, 1965	Liberal	5th Congress
7		Ambrosio Padilla (1910–1996)	January 17, 1966	December 30, 1969	Liberal	6th Congress
8		Gerry Roxas (1924–1982)	January 26, 1970	January 17, 1973	Liberal	7th Congress
Senate abolished (Note: The ratification of the 1973 Constitution abolished the Senate, and a unicameral legislature was established, later known as the Batasang Pambansa.) (January 17, 1973 – February 2, 1987)
9		Joseph Estrada (born 1937)	July 27, 1987	August 17, 1987	Liberal	8th Congress
10		Juan Ponce Enrile (1924–2025)	August 17, 1987	January 18, 1992	Nacionalista	8th Congress
11		Wigberto Tañada (born 1934)	January 18, 1992	June 30, 1995	Liberal	8th Congress
11		Wigberto Tañada (born 1934)	January 18, 1992	June 30, 1995	Liberal	9th Congress
12		Edgardo Angara (1934–2018)	August 28, 1995	October 10, 1996	LDP	10th Congress
13		Neptali Gonzales (1923–2001)	October 10, 1996	January 26, 1998	LDP	10th Congress
14		Ernesto Maceda (1935–2016)	January 26, 1998	June 30, 1998	NPC	10th Congress
15		Teofisto Guingona Jr. (born 1928)	July 27, 1998	February 7, 2001	Lakas	11th Congress
16		Rene Cayetano (1934–2003)	February 9, 2001	June 30, 2001	Lakas	11th Congress
17		Nene Pimentel (1933–2019)	July 23, 2001	June 3, 2002	PDP–Laban	12th Congress
18		Tito Sotto (born 1948)	June 3, 2002	June 30, 2004	LDP	12th Congress
19		Nene Pimentel (1933–2019)	July 26, 2004	June 30, 2010	PDP–Laban	13th Congress
19		Nene Pimentel (1933–2019)	July 26, 2004	June 30, 2010	PDP–Laban	14th Congress
20		Alan Peter Cayetano (born 1970)	July 26, 2010	June 30, 2013	Nacionalista	15th Congress
21		Juan Ponce Enrile (1924–2025)	July 22, 2013	July 28, 2014	PMP	16th Congress
—		Tito Sotto (born 1948); Acting	July 28, 2014	August 24, 2015	NPC	16th Congress
(21)		Juan Ponce Enrile (1924–2025)	August 24, 2015	June 30, 2016	PMP	16th Congress
22		Ralph Recto (born 1964)	July 25, 2016	February 27, 2017	Liberal	17th Congress
—		Antonio Trillanes (born 1971); Acting	February 27, 2017	February 28, 2017	Nacionalista	17th Congress
23		Franklin Drilon (born 1945)	February 28, 2017	June 30, 2022	Liberal	17th Congress
23		Franklin Drilon (born 1945)	February 28, 2017	June 30, 2022	Liberal	18th Congress
24		Koko Pimentel (born 1964)	July 25, 2022	June 30, 2025	PDP–Laban (until 2024)	19th Congress
24		Koko Pimentel (born 1964)	July 25, 2022	June 30, 2025	Nacionalista (from 2024)	19th Congress
25		Tito Sotto (born 1948)	July 28, 2025	September 8, 2025	NPC	20th Congress
26		Alan Peter Cayetano (born 1970)	September 9, 2025	May 11, 2026	Independent	20th Congress
27		Tito Sotto (born 1948)	May 11, 2026	June 3, 2026	NPC	20th Congress
28		Alan Peter Cayetano (born 1970)	June 17, 2026	Incumbent	Independent	20th Congress

== Deputy Minority Floor Leader of the Senate of the Philippines ==
Beginning in the 19th Congress, up to two deputy minority leaders are elected to assist the minority leader in their duties and assume the latter's responsibilities in the minority leader's absence. Imee Marcos currently serves as the deputy minority leader.

=== List of deputy minority floor leaders ===
Officeholder 1					Officeholder 2					Legislature
Portrait	Name (Birth–Death)	Term of office		Party	Portrait	Name (Birth–Death)	Term of office		Party	Legislature
Portrait	Name (Birth–Death)	Took office	Left office	Party	Portrait	Name (Birth–Death)	Took office	Left office	Party	Legislature
	Risa Hontiveros (born 1966)	August 2, 2022	September 8, 2025	Akbayan	None (August 2, 2022 – June 30, 2025)					19th Congress
	Risa Hontiveros (born 1966)	August 2, 2022	September 8, 2025	Akbayan		Juan Miguel Zubiri (born 1969)	July 30, 2025	September 8, 2025	Independent	20th Congress
	Rodante Marcoleta (born 1953)	September 9, 2025	May 11, 2026	Independent		Joel Villanueva (born 1975)	September 9, 2025	May 11, 2026	Independent	20th Congress
Vacant (May 11 – July 29, 2026)										20th Congress
	Imee Marcos (born 1955)	July 29, 2026	Incumbent	Nacionalista	Vacant (July 29, 2026 – present)					20th Congress

== See also ==
- Majority Floor Leader of the Senate of the Philippines
