= 2028 Philippine presidential election =

- May 8, 2028
Incumbent President
Bongbong Marcos
PFP

A presidential election is scheduled to be held in the Philippines on May 8, 2028, as part of a general election that will also determine the control of the Congress of the Philippines and numerous local positions in the country. This will be the 18th direct presidential election in the country since 1935, and will be the seventh sextennial presidential election since 1992.

Incumbent president Bongbong Marcos is term-limited under the Constitution of the Philippines and is ineligible for re-election. This election will determine the 18th president of the Philippines. The president and vice president are elected separately, thus, the two winning candidates may come from different political parties.

== Background ==
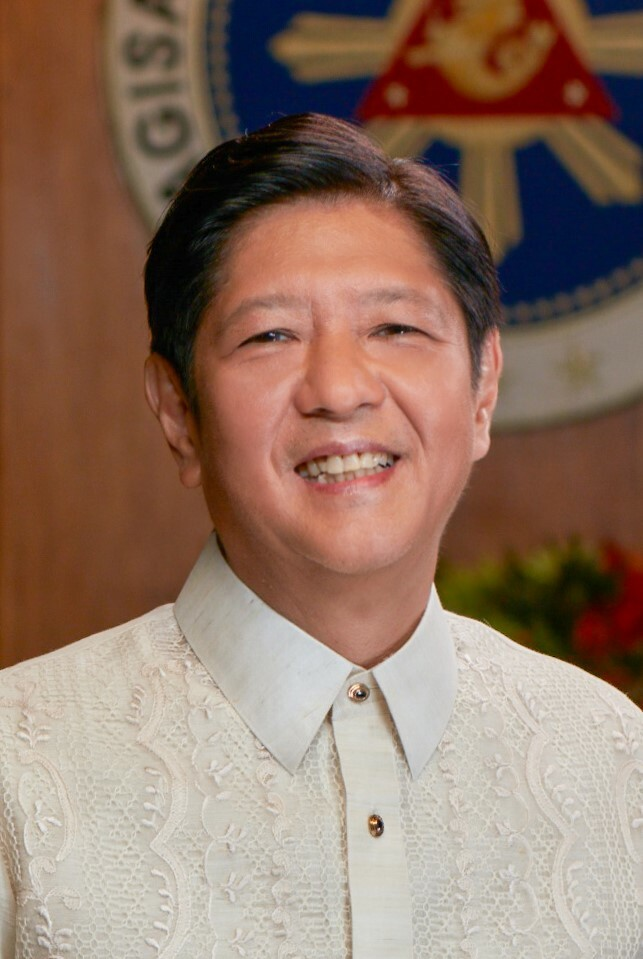
Bongbong Marcos, the incumbent president whose term will expire at noon on June 30, 2028.

In the 2022 Philippine presidential and vice presidential elections, the UniTeam ticket of former Senator Bongbong Marcos of the Partido Federal ng Pilipinas (PFP) and Davao City mayor Sara Duterte of Lakas won, running on a platform that promised broad continuity of incumbent president Rodrigo Duterte's programs and policies. The two became the first presidential ticket to win since 2004 and the first president and vice president to be elected by a majority since the establishment of the Fifth Republic in 1987, defeating the Liberal-led opposition ticket of incumbent vice president Leni Robredo and senator Kiko Pangilinan alongside several other candidates. Being the only candidate of the opposition Team Robredo–Pangilinan alliance to be re-elected in the 2022 Senate election, (Note: Senators Francis Escudero and Joel Villanueva ran as "guest" candidates of the TRoPa, and did not endorse Robredo.) senator Risa Hontiveros of Akbayan emerged as the de facto leader of the opposition against Marcos and Duterte.

During the Marcos presidency, relations between Marcos and Duterte worsened. Duterte left Lakas in May 2023 and later resigned from his cabinet in June 2024. On February 5, 2025, the vice president was impeached in the House of Representatives, following Duterte's controversial use of confidential and intelligence funds and her assassination threat against Marcos and his family. She became the first sitting vice president, and the fourth official in Philippine history, to be impeached. If Duterte had been convicted, she would have been removed from office and be barred from holding any government position, including the presidency.

For the 2025 midterm Senate election, Marcos formed the Alyansa para sa Bagong Pilipinas (Alyansa) electoral alliance, while former president Duterte formed a separate slate of candidates under the DuterTen in support of the vice president. The traditional opposition led by Hontiveros fielded two candidates under the KiBam ticket. During the campaign period, former president Duterte was arrested on charges related to the Philippine drug war. In response, the president's sister, Imee Marcos, withdrew from Alyansa. Six Alyansa candidates won seats, while three DuterTen candidates were elected. Two winning candidates, Imee and Camille Villar (an Alyansa candidate), were guest candidates on the DuterTen slate. Meanwhile, both candidates from the KiBam ticket secured victories, marking a significant gain for the opposition. Duterte ally and incumbent senator Bong Go emerged as the top-ranking candidate in the Senate race.

Following the election, the Senate minority sought to formally convene the Senate as an impeachment court on June 9; the court was officially convened the following day, June 10. Senators allied with Duterte attempted to dismiss the impeachment complaint, but the Senate ultimately voted to return the articles of impeachment to the House. On July 25, Duterte's impeachment was ruled unconstitutional by the Supreme Court on the basis that the fourth impeachment case violated the one-year ban on the filing of multiple impeachment cases but maintained that it was not absolving the vice president. While the House filed a motion for reconsideration, on August 6, the Senate voted to archive the articles of impeachment, with only senators Bam Aquino, Hontiveros, Pangilinan, and Tito Sotto voting against.

A flood control projects scandal emerged shortly after the election, with allegations of corruption around ghost projects, substandard construction, and irregularities in the bidding process of projects around the country. In response, a series of anti-corruption protests began in September 2025.

On May 11, 2026, Duterte was impeached again, becoming the first official in Philippine history to be impeached twice, and triggering a period of severe instability within the Senate. Her allies in the upper chamber ousted Sotto and elected Alan Peter Cayetano, a move incited by the return of Ronald dela Rosa following a prolonged absence due to an arrest warrant on charges related to the Philippine drug war. Tensions escalated after a Senate lockdown due to a shooting incident and attempts to arrest dela Rosa failed after he left the Senate's premises. On May 27, the minority bloc staged a walkout in opposition to a proposed rule change by the majority bloc for remote voting, which they claim was designed to accommodate dela Rosa and senators facing arrest warrants. Jinggoy Estrada was later detained on plunder and graft charges, further reducing the majority bloc to ten seats. On June 3, the minority bloc formed a quorum to declare all leadership positions vacant and installed Sherwin Gatchalian as Senate President pro tempore and acting Senate President, starting a leadership dispute. This was ultimately resolved on June 17, when Gatchalian was formally elected as Senate President, officially ousting Cayetano. The impeachment trial is scheduled to begin on July 6.

== Electoral system ==
Presidential elections in the Philippines are held every six years, after 1992, on the second Monday of May. Elections to the presidency use the first-past-the-post voting to determine the winner, with the candidate with the highest number of votes, whether or not one has a majority, winning the contested position. The elections are held in parallel and voters may split their ticket. If two or more candidates are tied for either position, Congress shall vote from among them which shall be president, as the case may be.

The winner will serve a six-year term commencing at noon on June 30, 2028, and ending on the same day, six years later.

=== Eligibility ===
The Constitution of the Philippines limits the occupancy of the presidency to natural-born citizens aged 40 on the day of the election who are registered to vote, who have been a resident of the Philippines for at least ten years immediately preceding such election, and are able to read and write. Incumbent presidents who have served a complete a six-year term are term-limited while their vice president may seek reelection for a second consecutive term.

== Timeline ==
=== 2022 ===
- May 11: Bongbong Marcos and Sara Duterte of the UniTeam alliance declares victory in the 2022 presidential and vice presidential election.
- May 24: Congress begins its canvassing of the election results.
- May 25: Congress finishes the canvassing, declaring Marcos and Duterte as the winners of the presidential and vice presidential election.
- June 19: Duterte is inaugurated in Davao City.
- June 30: Marcos is inaugurated in Manila as the 17th president of the Philippines and takes office along with Duterte as the 15th vice president of the Philippines.

=== 2024 ===
- May 20: Senator Francis Escudero replaces senator Juan Miguel Zubiri as Senate President.
- June 19: Duterte resigns as the secretary of education.
- December 2: The first impeachment complaint is filed against Duterte in relation to her assassination threat against Marcos and his family, and alleged extrajudicial killings during her tenure as Davao City mayor.
- December 4: Bagong Alyansang Makabayan (Makabayan) files the second impeachment complaint against Duterte over allegations of corruption due to her controversial use of confidential funds.
- December 19: A third impeachment complaint is filed against Duterte in relation to her confidential funds controversy.

=== 2025 ===
- February 5: Duterte is impeached by the House of Representatives, becoming the first vice president, and the fourth official, to be impeached in Philippine history.
- March 11: Former president Duterte is arrested by the International Criminal Court.
- May 12: Midterm elections are held. In the Senate, six Alyansa para sa Bagong Pilipinas candidates win seats, against the DuterTen's three and the KiBam ticket's two. In the House, Marcos-aligned Lakas–CMD remained the dominant party, while Akbayan emerged as the top party in the party-list election.
- June 9: Senators Koko Pimentel and Risa Hontiveros fail to start the impeachment court in the Senate.
- June 10: Senate remands the articles of impeachment back to the house.
- June 11: The House certifies the impeachment complaint.
- July 25: The Supreme Court declares the articles of impeachment against Duterte "unconstitutional".
- September 4: Protests against corruption begin in response to the flood control projects scandal.
- September 9: Senator Tito Sotto ousts Escudero as Senate President.
- September 17: House Speaker Martin Romualdez resigns, Bojie Dy is elected as the new House Speaker following the resignation of Romualdez.
- September 21: Major anti-corruption protests in Metro Manila.

=== 2026 ===
- February 2: Two new impeachment complaints against Duterte are filed in relation to her confidential funds controversy; Makabayan files the first complaint while Tindig Pilipinas, Akbayan and Mamamayang Liberal file the second.
- February 17: Hontiveros states that there is a consensus that the liberal opposition will choose a common candidate by the end of 2026.
- February 18:
  - Sara Duterte announces her bid for the presidency.
  - A fourth impeachment complaint was filed against Duterte.
- February 21: President Marcos meets with former vice president Leni Robredo in Naga, Camarines Sur.
- February 22: Duterte declares that she already recruited her running mate last year but chose to not reveal their name yet.
- March 18: Manila Mayor Isko Moreno rules out of 2028 for any national position and to stay as mayor in the nation's capital.
- April 12: Sebastian Duterte and other Duterte supporters, allies, and factions unite and form the RAGE Coalition in support of Sara Duterte.
- April 21: Robredo officially rules out 2028 run for any national position and to stay as mayor in Naga.
- April 25: Hontiveros says she has been preparing and is seriously considering a bid for the presidency after Robredo rules out run in 2028.
- April 27: Interior and Local Government Secretary Jonvic Remulla says he is ready for the role of president but he is not sure if the people will accept him running for president.
- May 5: Senator Raffy Tulfo officially rules out any possibility of running for president in 2028 and will seek re-election as senator.
- May 8: Remulla announces his decision not to seek the presidency and rather run for local position in his home province of Cavite in 2028.
- May 11:
  - Sara Duterte is impeached for a second time in the House of Representatives.
  - Senator Alan Peter Cayetano ousts Sotto as Senate President after the appearance of senator Ronald dela Rosa.
- May 13: Tensions in the Senate result in a lockdown following a shooting incident, and attempts to arrest Ronald dela Rosa in the Senate fail.
- June 3: The Senate minority bloc forms a quorum after the majority failed to attend two sessions in a row, declares all leadership positions vacant, and installs Sherwin Gatchalian as Senate President pro tempore and acting Senate President, starting a leadership dispute.
- June 17: Gatchalian is elected as Senate President after the appearance of senator Joel Villanueva, ousting Cayetano and ending the leadership dispute.
- June 18: Leaders from Akbayan, Magdalo Party-List, Liberal Party, and Katipunan ng Nagkakaisang Pilipino caucused and announced its intention to field a single ticket under "one united democratic opposition."

== Candidates ==
=== For president ===
==== Declared ====
Individuals who have officially declared that they will be running
Vice President
Sara Duterte
(2022–present)

===== Sara Duterte =====
Sara Duterte is the eldest daughter of former president Rodrigo Duterte and has served as the 15th vice president of the Philippines since her landslide victory in the 2022 election under the UniTeam Alliance, she won alongside with Bongbong Marcos. On February 7, 2025, Duterte announced in a press conference that she is "seriously considering" running for elected office in 2028 despite her ongoing impeachment at that time, though she affirmed that she will assess her chances of being elected before making a major decision. While she did not specify any position, she later confirmed that she would be seeking the presidency in such a case, motivated by discontent over the direction of the Marcos administration. On February 18, 2026, Duterte formally announced her presidential bid at a press conference.

==== Declared under certain conditions ====
Individuals who will announce their candidacy if a certain condition is met or occurs
Mayor of Davao City
Sebastian Duterte
(2026–present)

===== Sebastian Duterte =====
Sebastian Duterte is the youngest son of Rodrigo Duterte the and younger brother of Sara Duterte who has served as the mayor of Davao City since 2026, succeeding his father after he failed to take office in June 2025. He is the third member of his family to serve as mayor and was later appointed as the party president of his father and the ruling party during his administration, the Partido Demokratiko Pilipino on April 11, 2026. On April 13, 2026, ACT Teachers Partylist representative Antonio Tinio said that the Duterte camp is setting up Duterte as their presidential candidate if Sara is impeached. His comments came a few days after he was appointed the party president of the PDP. Duterte ally and former congressman Mike Defensor confirmed on the next day that Sebastian will run for president if Sara is impeached and disqualified.

==== Publicly expressed interest ====
The following individuals have expressed running for president but has no final decision yet.

Individuals who have expressed an interest in running for the presidential election (Note: Individuals listed below have, as of April 2026, personally expressed an interest in seeking the 2028 presidential election in at least two reliable media sources in the last six months.)
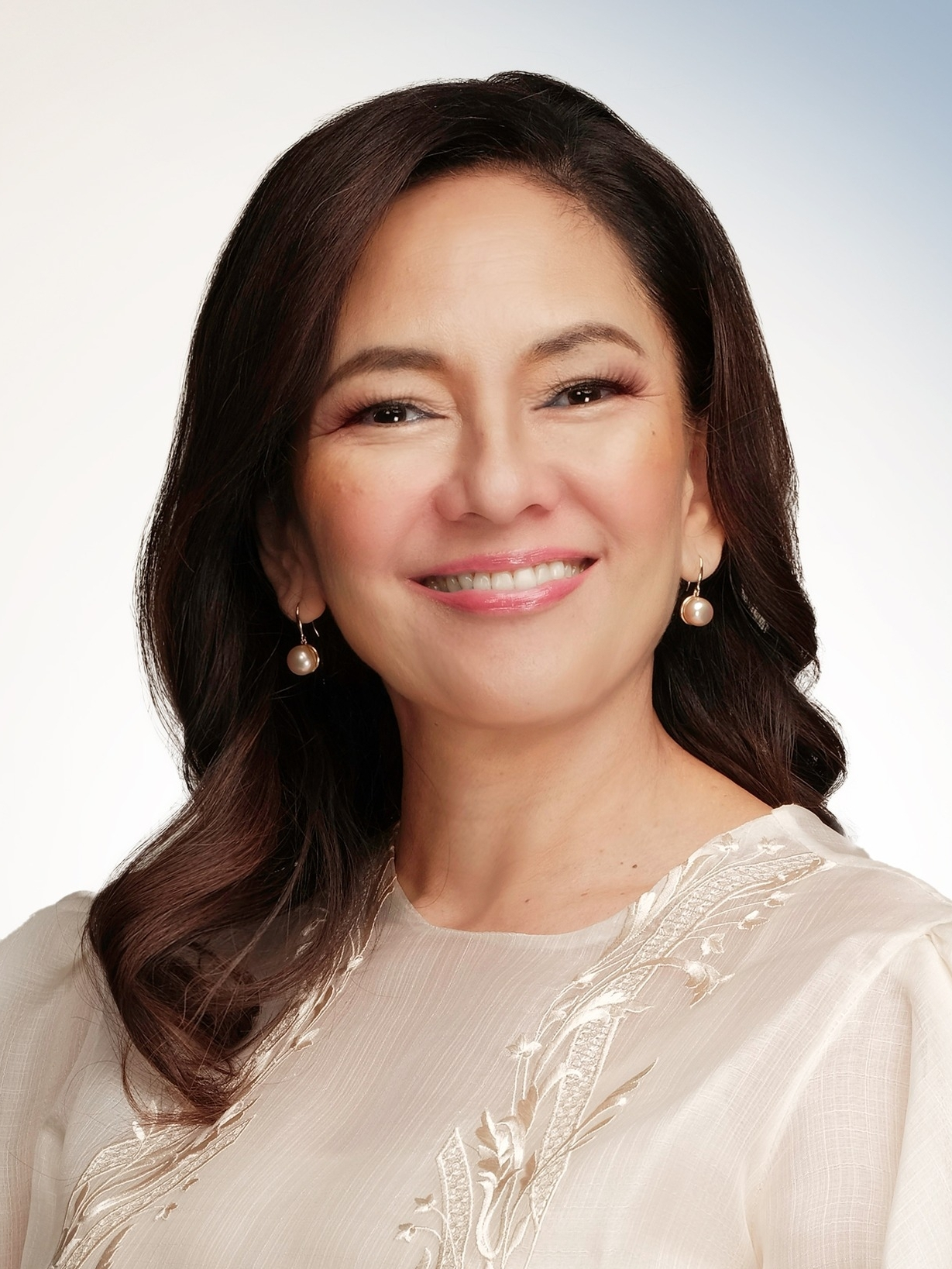
Senator
Risa Hontiveros
(2016–present)

===== Risa Hontiveros =====
Risa Hontiveros has served as a senator of the Philippines since 2016. At a press conference on May 21, 2025, Hontiveros stated her openness to a possible presidential run, although she emphasized that she remained "open to all possibilities." She reiterated that her main priority is to unify and strengthen the opposition, and expressed confidence that a standard bearer for the liberal-progressive bloc, or a "third force," would emerge by 2028. On February 2, 2026, Hontiveros said she is willing to run for president if the liberal opposition will choose her. On February 25, 2026, Hontiveros said that she has been praying for readiness as she is seriously considering a run for the presidency and she expressed gratitude for the growing support from key leaders of the opposition.

==== Speculated by the media ====
The following individuals have been mentioned in media discussions in the past six months as possible presidential candidates but have not publicly expressed interest in running.

Speculated by the media (Note: Individuals listed below have, as of April 2026, been mentioned as potential 2028 presidential candidates in at least two reliable media sources in the last six months.)
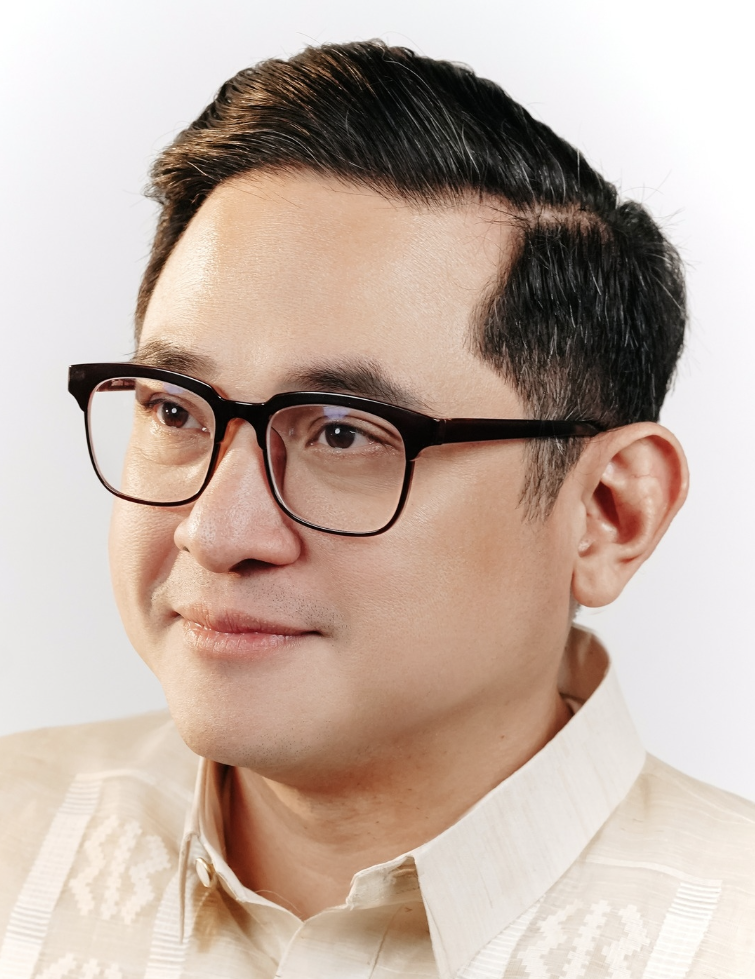
Senator
Bam Aquino
(2025–present)

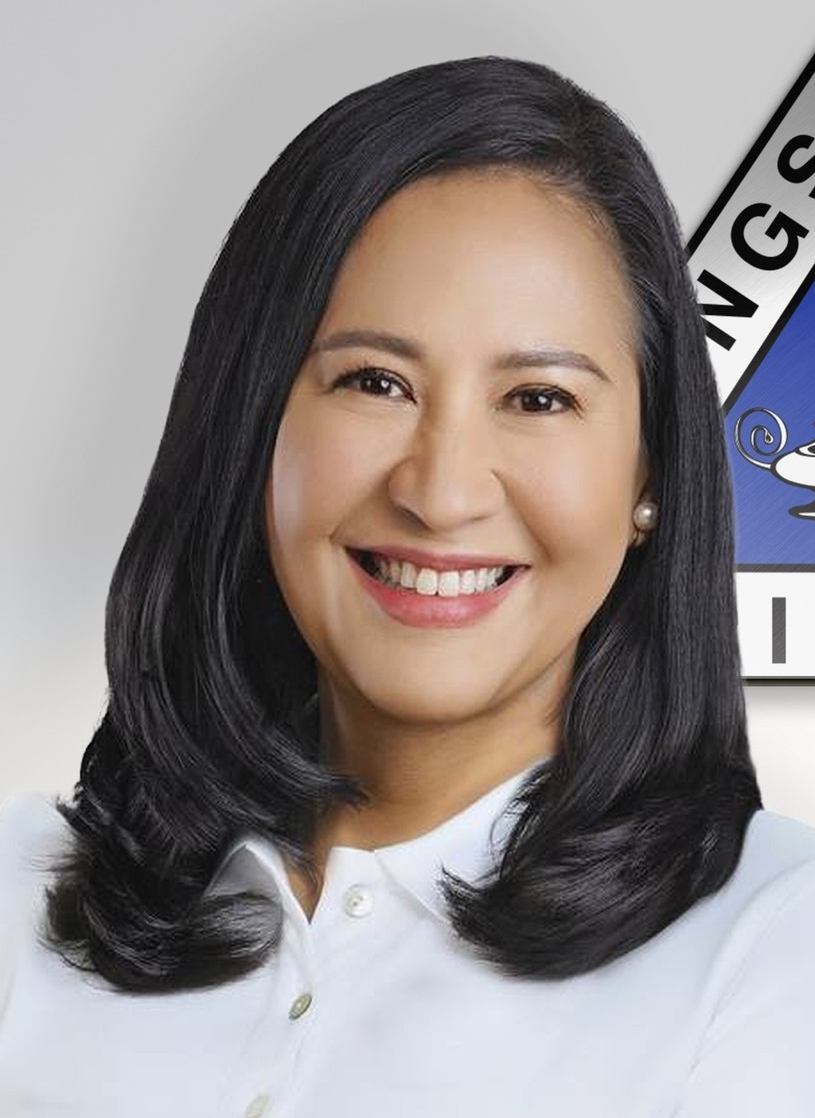
Mayor of Quezon City
Joy Belmonte
(2019–present)

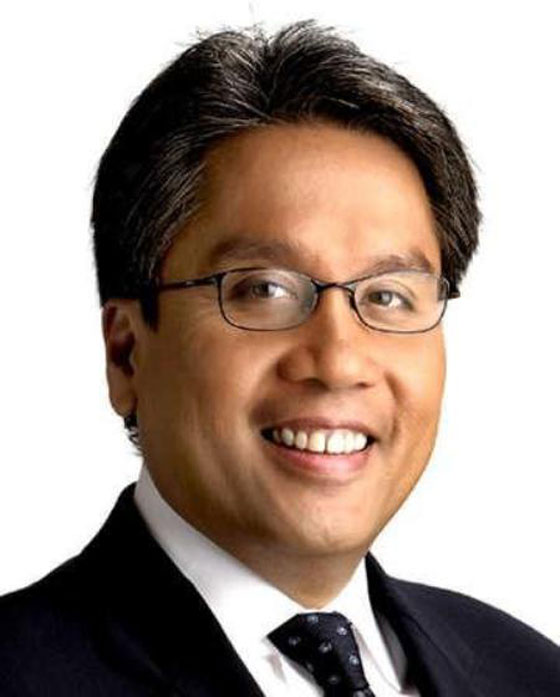
Secretary of the Interior and Local Government
Mar Roxas
(2012–2015)

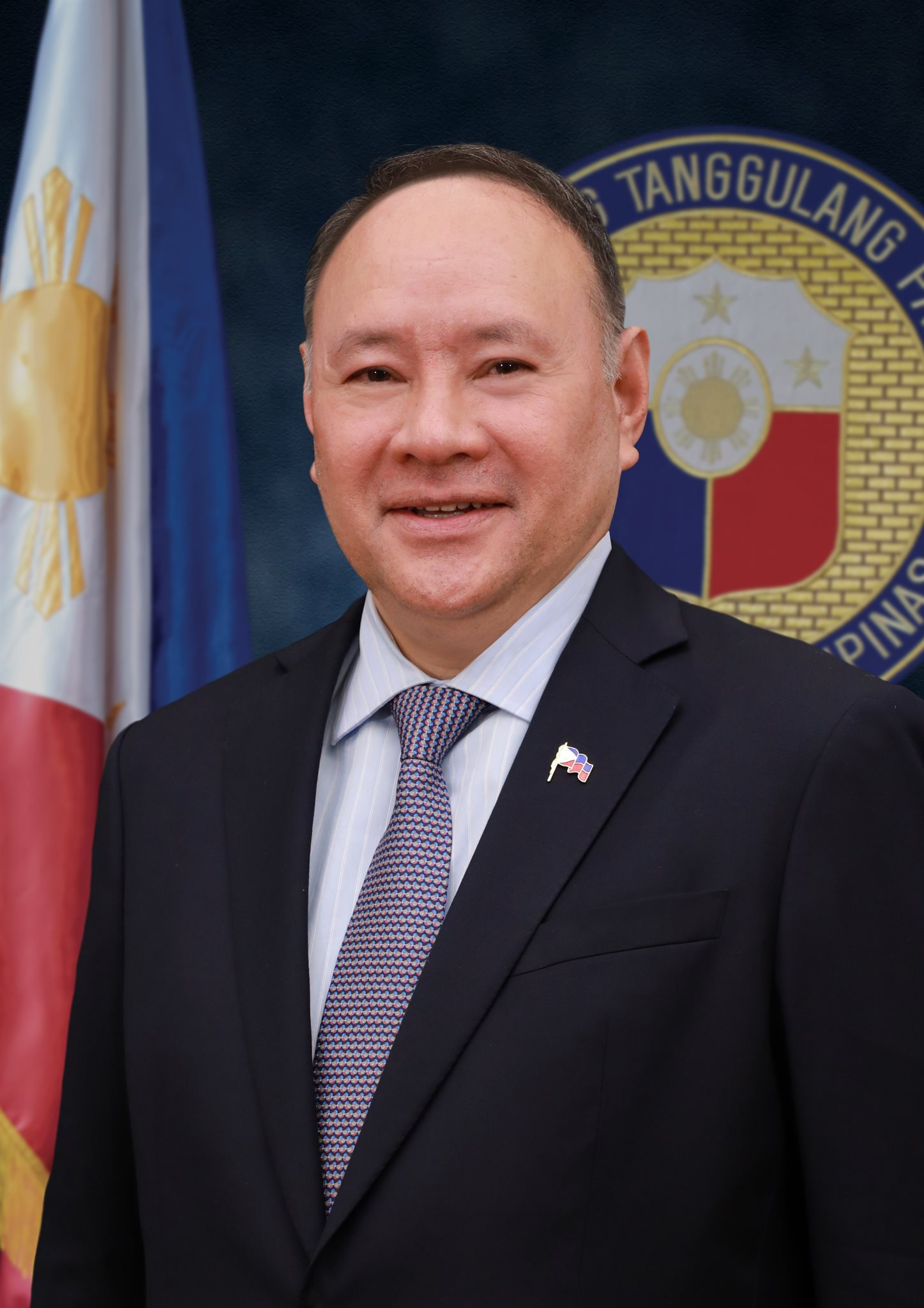
Secretary of National Defense
Gilberto Teodoro
(2023–present)

===== Bam Aquino =====
Bam Aquino has served as senator of the Philippines since 2025, and previously held the position from 2013 to 2019. Tony Lopez of the The Philippine Star attributed his second-place finish in the 2025 Philippine Senate election to strong support in key electoral strongholds prominent in national elections, including the Lingayen–Lucena corridor, a strength he cited in naming him as a potential presidential frontrunner in 2028. By late 2025, a number of volunteer movements affiliated with Leni Robredo's 2022 presidential campaign expressed their support for Aquino in the presidential race. In response, he distanced himself from presidential speculation and encourage his supporters to focus on his legislative agenda. At the same time, he declined a run for the vice presidency.

===== Joy Belmonte =====
Joy Belmonte has served as the 12th mayor of Quezon City since 2019. She was described by former vice president and Naga city mayor Leni Robredo as a good candidate for the presidency.

===== Mar Roxas =====
Mar Roxas served as the 37th secretary of the interior and local government and senator from 2004 to 2010, Roxas previously ran for president in 2016, vice president in 2010, and senator in 2019. He lost all elections, causing him to retire in 2019. Representative Edgar Erice said that Roxas is being considered as a possible standard bearer of the opposition after Leni Robredo ruled out a national run, saying that Roxas has the integrity and credentials to be president and that his allies are encouraging him to reconsider a presidential bid. Erice also said that Roxas could "reset" the Philippines to a progressive path.

===== Gilberto Teodoro =====
Gibo Teodoro currently serves as the Secretary of National Defense, a post he previously served from 2007-2009 during the term of President Gloria Macapagal-Arroyo. He formerly served as a Representative of Tarlac's First Congressional District from 1998-2007. A prominent relative of the Cojuangco's, he was former President Corazon Aquino's first cousin. He previously ran as President during the 2010 Philippine Presidential Elections but lost to his second cousin, former President Benigno Aquino III. In 2022, he unsuccessfully bid for a Senate seat, placing 15th overall.

His name was recently floated again by Senator Ping Lacson when the latter floated the idea of a "Gilberto Teodoro Presidency" while commending on the Defense Chief's speech in Seoul Forum denouncing China’s latest assertion and aggression in South China Sea.

=== Declined to run for president ===
The following individuals have been mentioned as potential candidates but have publicly declined to run for both position.

- Vince Dizon (Independent), incumbent secretary of transportation (2026–present)
  - Upon becoming public works and highways secretary, Dizon ruled out a run for public office in 2028 and instead planned a return to the private sector if not appointed to serve in the executive branch of the incoming administration.
- Francis Escudero (NPC), former Senate president (2024–2025) and incumbent senator of the Philippines (2007–2019, 2022–present)
  - Escudero stated that he has no plans to seek higher office in the 2028 elections.
- Panfilo Lacson (Independent), former Senate President Pro Tempore (2025–2026) and incumbent senator of the Philippines (2001–2013, 2018–2022, 2025–present)
  - Lacson has stated that he will not run in 2028 and will retire from the senate in 2031 and won't seek re-election.
- Benjamin Magalong (NPC), incumbent mayor of Baguio (2019–present)
  - Magalong plans to retire and will not run for any public office in 2028, this came after he saw lawyer Raul Lambino proposing a "Duterte-Magalong 2028" tandem in which Magalong thought was a joke.
- Isko Moreno (Aksyon), incumbent mayor of Manila (2019–2022, 2025–present)
  - On May 20, 2025, Moreno vowed to stay in local politics and complete three terms as mayor.
- Jonvic Remulla (NUP), incumbent secretary of the interior and local government (2024–present)
  - On December 22, 2025, Remulla said he might run for president in 2028, yet his wife would need to approve first and it is just a possibility. But, on May 5, 2026, Remulla reiterated that he is not committed on running, and it is just a possibility. Few days later, on May 8, he changed his plans and will just run for a local post in Cavite for the 2028 elections.
- Leni Robredo (Liberal), former vice president of the Philippines (2016–2022) and incumbent mayor of Naga, Camarines Sur (2025–present)
  - After submitting her candidacy for the mayoralty of Naga, Camarines Sur, on October 6, 2024, Robredo declined a subsequent run for higher office in 2028 and committed herself to serving three full terms in local government.
- Raffy Tulfo (Independent), incumbent senator of the Philippines (2022–present)
  - In a May 2024 interview with ANC, Tulfo stated that he was not planning a presidential bid for 2028 and instead preferred to focus on his Senate term, deeming such a pursuit a mere "headache".
- Vice Ganda, comedian, actor (1997–present) and singer (2009–present)
  - Vice Ganda says that she could be bashed by people who actually think she's running and said that she does not want to be included in political talk like that.
- Juan Miguel Zubiri (Independent), former Senate president (2022–2024), incumbent Senate majority leader (2008–2010, 2018–2022, 2025–2026, 2026–present) and incumbent senator of the Philippines (2016–present)
  - Zubiri plans to retire from public office upon the conclusion of his Senate term after performing poorly in opinion polling for higher positions.

== Opinion polling ==
Social research institutions in the Philippines, including Social Weather Stations (SWS), Pulse Asia, OCTA Research, have conducted surveys for the 2028 Philippine presidential election as early as 2025. In each poll, bold indicates the leading candidate whereas italics indicate runner(s)-up within the margin of error.

=== Before the filing of candidacy ===
Fieldwork date(s)	Pollster	Sample size	MoE	Angara LDP	Aquino KANP	Aragones Akay	Belmonte SBP	Dizon (Note: Declined to run) Ind.	R. Duterte (Note: Ineligible) PDP	Sa. Duterte HNP	Se. Duterte PDP	Escudero NPC	Gatchalian NPC	Go PDP	Hontiveros Akbayan	Lacson Ind.	Magalong NPC	B. Marcos PFP	I. Marcos Nacionalista	S. Marcos PFP	Moreno Aksyon	Pacquiao PFP	Padilla PDP	Pangilinan Liberal	Poe Ind.	Remulla NUP	Robredo Liberal	Romualdez Lakas	Singson Ind.	T. Sotto NPC	V. Sotto Ind.	Torre Ind.	R. Tulfo Ind.	Others	Und./ None	Ref.	Lead
June 28–July 3 & 6, 2026	Pulse Asia	2,400	±2.0%	—	—	0.02	—	1	—	**49**	0.05	—	—	—	0.01	0.02	1	0.1	—	—	—	—	0.1	—	—	—	26	—	—	0.02	0.03	0.1	14	—	9	1	**Sa. Duterte +23**
May 7–9, 2026	Pulse Asia	1,500	±2.5%	—	0.03	—	—	—	—	**51**	—	—	—	—	—	—	—	—	—	—	—	—	—	—	—	—	41	—	—	—	—	—	0.02	—	8	—	**Sa. Duterte +10**
March 19–25, 2026	OCTA Research	1,200	±3.0%	—	4	—	—	—	—	**33**	—	—	—	—	—	—	—	—	—	—	10	—	—	—	—	—	21	—	—	—	—	—	9	20	2	—	**Sa. Duterte +12**
March 10–17, 2026	WR Numero	1,455	±3.0%	0.7	3.2	—	0.4	0.1	—	**35.9**	—	—	—	3.6	0.7	—	—	—	—	—	—	—	—	1.4	—	0.3	15.7	—	—	—	—	0.0	18.5	—	19.4	—	**Sa. Duterte +17.4**
February 27 – March 2, 2026	Pulse Asia	—	±2.8%	—	5	—	—	—	—	**43**	—	—	—	—	2	—	—	—	—	—	—	—	—	—	—	1	27	—	—	—	—	—	19	—	3	—	**Sa. Duterte +16**
February 19–20, 2026	Tangere	1,200	±2.77%	—	—	—	—	—	—	**43**	—	—	—	—	3	—	—	—	—	—	—	—	—	—	—	—	27	—	—	—	—	—	15	—	12	—	**Sa. Duterte +16**
November 21–28, 2025	WR Numero	1,412	±3.0%	—	2	—	—	—	—	**33.3**	—	—	—	4	2.4	—	0.5	—	—	—	—	—	3.3	1.6	3.3	0.3	13	0.8	—	—	—	—	13.3	—	22.2	—	**Sa. Duterte +19.9**
August 27–30, 2025	Tangere	1,400	±2.57%	—	—	—	—	—	—	**36**	—	1	—	—	2	—	—	—	—	—	—	—	1	—	—	—	10	3	—	—	34	—	6	1	6	—	**Sa. Duterte +2**
July 29 – August 6, 2025	WR Numero	1,418	—	—	3.1	—	—	—	—	**31.4**	—	1.3	0.1	6.5	1.4	—	—	—	4.4	—	—	1.0	2.0	—	2.1	—	13.3	0.7	—	—	—	—	10.3	1.7	5	—	**Sa. Duterte +18.1**
June 20–22, 2025	Tangere	2,000	±2.15%	—	—	—	—	—	—	**35**	—	3	—	13	3	—	—	—	1	—	—	—	1	—	—	—	19	6	—	—	—	—	9	—	10	—	**Sa. Duterte +16**
May 20–21, 2025	Tangere	1,800	±2.48%	—	—	—	—	—	—	**29**	—	3	—	15	—	—	—	—	—	—	—	—	3	—	—	—	21	6	—	—	—	—	11	1	11	—	**Sa. Duterte +8**
March 31 – April 7, 2025	WR Numero	—	—	—	—	—	—	—	—	**30.2**	—	—	—	4	2.3	—	—	—	3.8	—	—	2.1	1.7	—	4.7	—	12.7	0.5	—	—	—	—	17.9	2.8	17.5	—	**Sa. Duterte +12.3**
February 20–26, 2025	Pulse Asia	—	—	—	—	—	—	—	—	**39**	—	—	—	—	5	—	—	—	—	—	—	—	—	—	14	—	—	1	—	—	—	—	28	—	—	—	**Sa. Duterte +11**
February 10–18, 2025	WR Numero	1,814	±2.0%	—	—	—	—	—	—	**29.1**	—	—	—	—	1.1	—	—	—	2.8	—	—	4.1	1.9	—	3.8	—	12.4	1.2	—	—	—	—	19.3	2.8	22.6	—	**Sa. Duterte +6.5**
September 5—23, 2024	WR Numero	1,729	—	—	—	—	—	—	—	24	—	—	—	—	4	—	—	—	5	—	—	4	3	—	5	—	9	1	—	—	—	—	24	—	18	—	Tie
June 25–30, 2024	Oculum	1,200	±3.0%	—	—	—	—	—	—	**25.4**	—	—	—	—	2.9	—	—	—	5.7	—	4.8	3.1	2.6	—	—	—	10.6	0.8	—	—	—	—	18.5	—	20.4	4.3	**Sa. Duterte +5**
May 23–26, 2024	Tangere		±2.5%	—	—	—	—	—	—	**27.67**	—	—	—	—	3.73	—	—	—	4.13	—	6.60	1.73	0.60	—	10.20	—	14.33	—	—	—	—	—	27.07	3.93	—	—	**Sa. Duterte +0.6**
March 6–10, 2024	Pulse Asia	—	—	—	—	—	—	—	0.2	34	—	—	—	—	1	—	—	—	5	—	0.1	3	2	—	—	—	11	0.5	—	—	—	—	**35**	—	5	2	**R. Tulfo +1**
February 21–29, 2024	Oculum	3,000	±2.0%	—	—	—	—	—	—	**42**	—	—	—	—	—	—	—	—	4	—	4	4	2	—	—	—	10	0.4	—	—	—	—	17	2	14	—	**Sa. Duterte +28**
January 20–24, 2024	Tangere	2,000	—	—	—	—	—	—	—	**31.5**	—	—	—	—	1	—	—	—	3	—	6	2	—	—	10	—	12	0.3	1	—	—	—	30.8	4	—	—	**Sa. Duterte +0.7**
November 24 – December 24, 2023	WR Numero	1,500	—	—	—	—	—	—	—	**36**	—	—	—	—	1	—	—	—	7	—	—	5	5	—	—	—	9	1	—	—	—	—	23	—	14	—	**Sa. Duterte +13**
April 15–18, 2023	SWS	1,200	±3.0%	—	—	—	—	—	3	**28**	—	—	—	—	—	—	—	1	1	1	1	2	1	—	—	—	6	—	—	—	—	—	11	5	**41**		**None +13**
