= 2026 President of the Senate of the Philippines election =

2026 President of the Senate of the Philippines election may refer to:

- May 2026 President of the Senate of the Philippines election
- June 2026 President of the Senate of the Philippines election
