= 2026 Senate majority leadership election (disambiguation) =

Following national elections in 2026, several contests for Senate majority leader have taken place:

- 2026 Philippine Senate leadership dispute
- 2026 Senate Democratic Caucus leadership election (United States)
