= June 2026 President of the Senate of the Philippines election =

58th leadership election in the Philippine Senate

- June 17, 2026

13 out of 24 members of the Senate (Note: Nine senators were absent (A. Cayetano, P. Cayetano, Go, Legarda, Marcoleta, Marcos, Padilla, C. Villar, M. Villar), one is in hiding (dela Rosa), and another one is detained and suspended (Estrada).) 13 votes needed to win
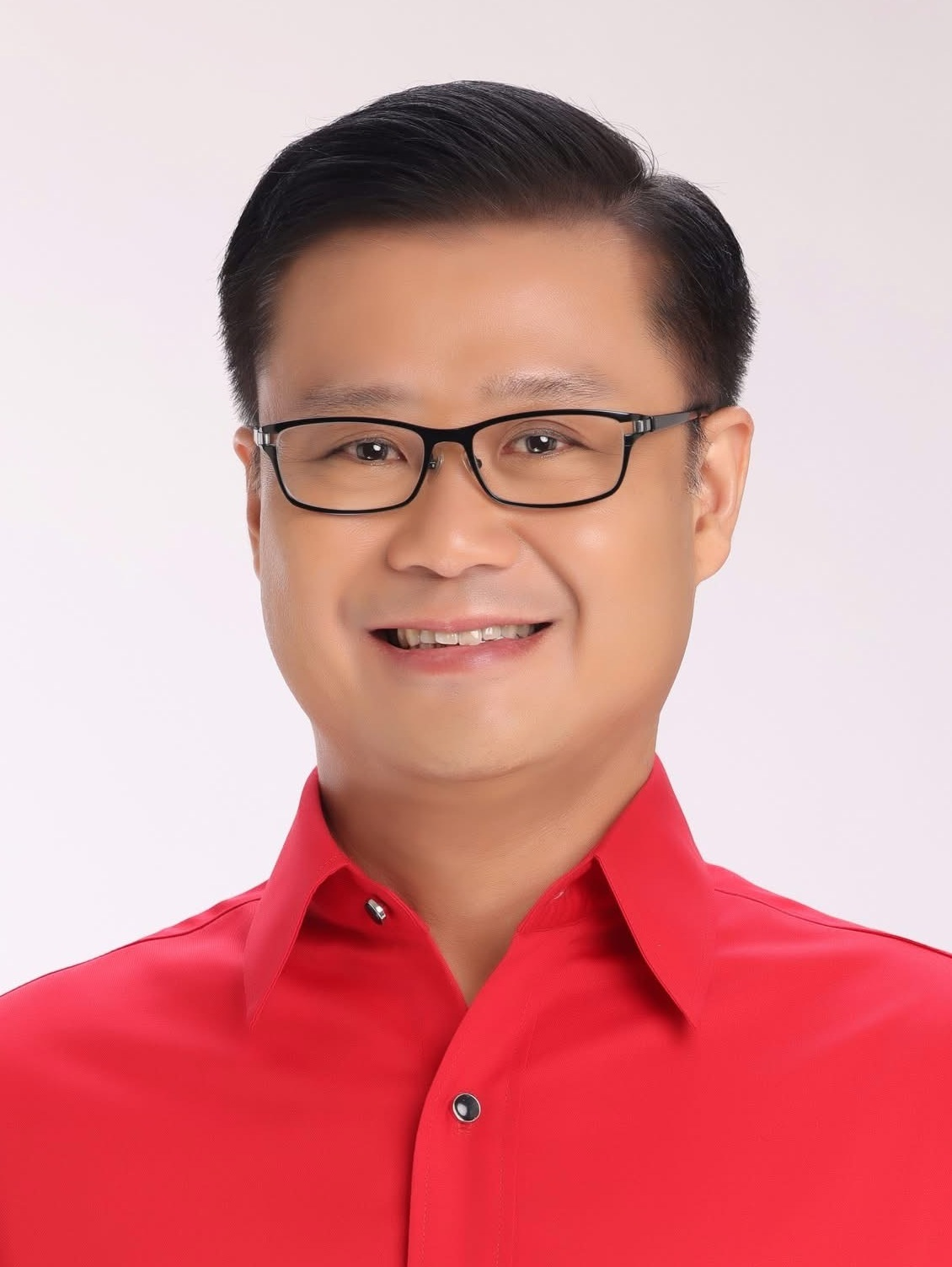
Nominee	Sherwin Gatchalian
Party	NPC
Senatorial vote	13
Percentage	100.00%
- Bloc composition of the Senate of the Philippines after the election
Senate President before election
Alan Peter Cayetano
Independent
Elected Senate President
Sherwin Gatchalian
NPC

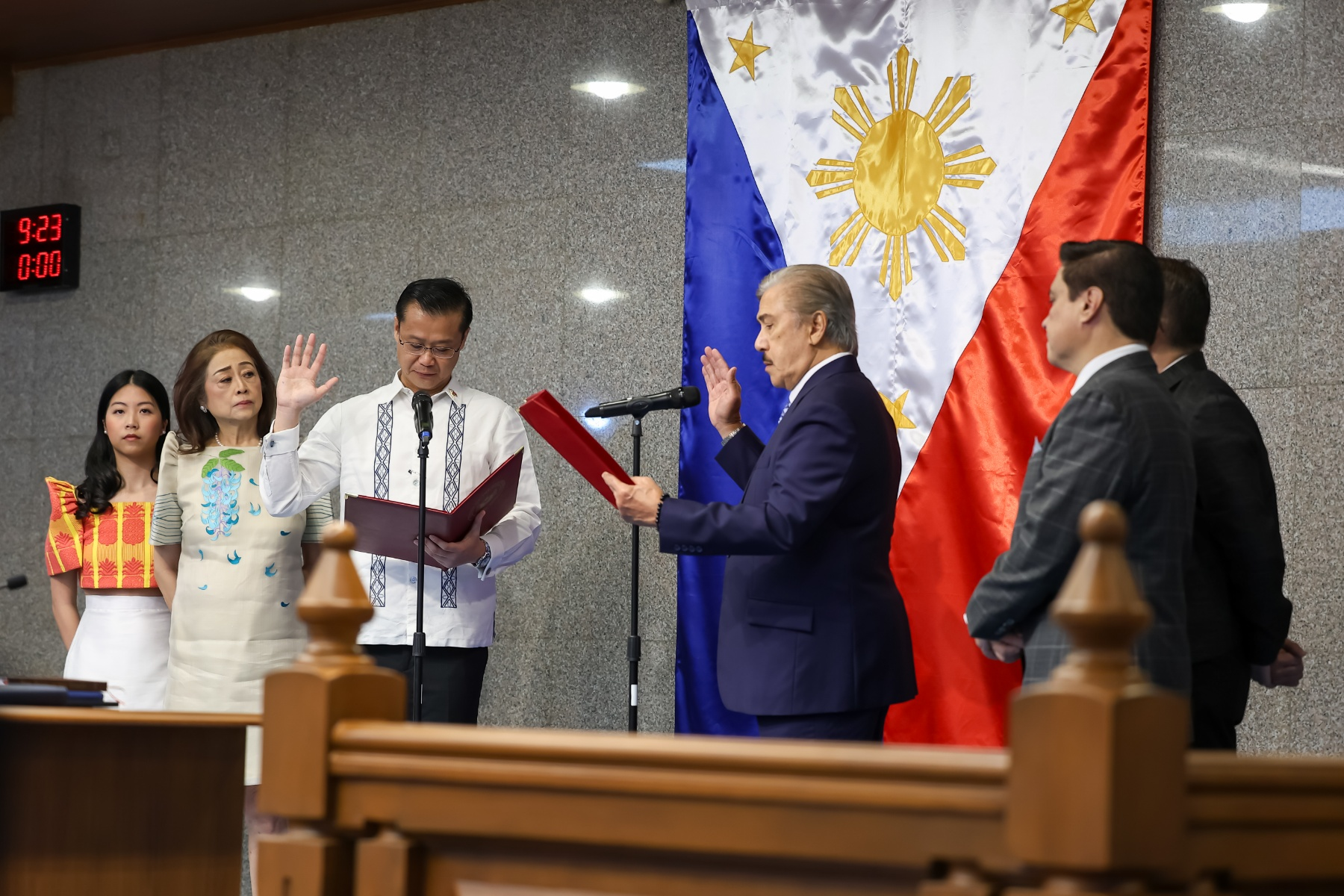
Sherwin Gatchalian (third from left) is sworn in by Tito Sotto (third from right) as president of the Senate on June 17, 2026.

An election for all positions in the Senate of the Philippines was held on June 17, 2026, during a special session of Congress called by President Bongbong Marcos. It was the fifth leadership election of the Senate in the 20th Congress and the 57th election for the Senate presidency in the chamber's history. This was the first time in the history of the Philippine Senate that five leadership changes took place in a single Congress, with the presidency settled in a special session.

This election by acclamation ousted incumbent Senate president Alan Peter Cayetano and installed disputed president pro tempore Sherwin Gatchalian as president of the Senate. It ended a two-week long leadership dispute on who was the legitimate Senate president after Gatchalian was elected as president pro tempore on June 3, 2026, with only a 12-member quorum.

== Background ==
=== June 2026 leadership crisis ===
On June 1 and 2, 2026, the Senate experienced a two-day legislative impasse when Cayetano and the members of the majority failed to attend the scheduled sessions of those days, after the arrest of Senator Jinggoy Estrada on Senate premises. The following day, on June 3, Senator Escudero joined the eleven members of the Senate minority to establish a quorum of twelve senators. Secretary of the Senate Jose Luis Montales was called upon by presiding officer Sherwin Gatchalian to conduct the roll call but refused to do so. This prompted Gatchalian to direct instead deputy Secretary Marivic Garcia, who proceeded to call the roll. After the roll call, the new majority motioned to declare all leadership positions vacant, unseating Cayetano and Legarda from their offices, and electing Senator Gatchalian as Senate president pro tempore and acting Senate president, as a 13-seat Senate quorum is required for an election of a permanent Senate president. Senator Juan Miguel Zubiri became Senate Majority Leader. Zubiri nominated Renato Bantug Jr. to the post of Secretary of the Senate and Alfredo S. Corpuz as Senate Sergeant-at-Arms, who were both sworn in by Gatchalian. The senate was thereafter adjourned sine die of its first regular session.

Gatchalian, following his election as President pro tempore, argued that a valid quorum existed to depose Cayetano and Legarda, as the new majority counted 12 out of 22 effective senators, following the arrest of Estrada with Senator Bato dela Rosa beyond the Senate's reach due to an arrest warrant issued by the International Criminal Court, citing the following precedents:

- the 1949 Supreme Court ruling Avelino v. Cuenco, where Senator Mariano Cuenco was elected as acting Senate president over Senate President José Avelino, on a quorum of 12 out of 23 senators (one senator Tomas Confesor was in the United States at the time and out of the Senate's jurisdiction to compel attendance). The Supreme Court upheld Cuenco's election as valid, after Avelino filed a quo warranto petition before the Supreme Court asking the Court to declare him the rightful Senate president.
- a 2015 Senate precedent, where then-Senate President Franklin Drilon called a quorum with just 12 senators present on May 5, 2015, as Senators Jinggoy Estrada, Bong Revilla and Juan Ponce Enrile were in custody following the pork barrel scam, with another 4 senators out of the country at that time.

Gatchalian also stated that the Senate was on the brink of constitutional violation due to not informing the lower house that the Senate would cancel sessions due to the absences of the former majority.

Malacañang Palace and the House of Representatives under Speaker Bojie Dy released statements recognizing Gatchalian as acting Senate president and the "new majority" in the Senate. Former Senate president Franklin Drilon also called Gatchalian as the 'valid' Senate acting president unless the Supreme Court says otherwise.

Both Cayetano and Legarda disputed the election and continue to claim their posts as Senate president and Senate president pro tempore, respectively.

=== Special session called by President Marcos ===
On June 15, 2026, President Bongbong Marcos issued Proclamation No. 1318, which called Congress to hold a special session on June 17, 2026 to tackle priority national issues. Earlier, on June 14, 2026, Senator Joel Villanueva, said in a video message aired during a worship service of the Jesus Is Lord Church, that he would attend a special session if it was to be called by President Marcos.

== Electoral system ==
The Senate president is elected by a majority vote of the members of the Senate from among themselves. Since there are 24 senators, 13 votes are needed to win the Senate presidency, including any vacant seats or senators not attending the session. Although Senate presidents are elected at the start of each Congress, there had been numerous instances of Senate leadership elections in which a sitting Senate president has been unseated in the middle of a session. Term-sharing agreements among senators who are both eyeing the position of the Senate president also played a role in changing the leadership of the Senate, but in a smooth manner, through the peaceful transition of power. Three known instances were in 1999, 2006, and 2018.

Newly elected Senate presidents are traditionally sworn in by the youngest senator, known as the "Benjamin" of the chamber, usually one belonging to the majority bloc, as in the cases of Bam Aquino administering the oath of office to Franklin Drilon in 2013, Manny Pacquiao to Koko Pimentel in 2016, Mark Villar to Francis Escudero in 2024, and Camille Villar to Alan Peter Cayetano in 2026.

Unlike the symbolic presiding officers of upper houses in some other governments, the Senate president of the Philippines has considerable power to influence the legislative agenda, and has a normal vote rather than acting only as a tie-breaker, though the tradition that the presiding officer is the last to vote has been maintained. A tied vote in the Senate therefore means that the motion is lost; the Senate president, having already voted in the normal way, cannot also cast a tie-breaking vote.

== Election ==
=== Leadership election ===
Prior to the start of the Senate's special session on June 17, 2026, Alan Peter Cayetano conceded the Senate presidency and acknowledged that Gatchalian's bloc would soon have the numbers to oust him. Senator Joel Villanueva later attended the special session. Only thirteen senators were present at the opening of the session, as members of Cayetano's bloc did not attend. After a constitutional quorum was declared, Senate majority leader Juan Miguel Zubiri proceeded with the election for Senate president and nominated Gatchalian for the position. Gatchalian was the sole nominee and was elected by acclamation.

=== Results ===
June 2026 election for the president of the Senate
Party	Nominee	Nominated by	Votes	%
NPC	Sherwin Gatchalian	Juan Miguel Zubiri	13	100.00
Absent			11	—
Total votes			13	100.00

Senators who supported the leadership change
No.	Senator	Party	Original bloc (after the June 3, 2026 election for president pro tempore)
1	Bam Aquino	KANP	Majority
2	JV Ejercito	NPC	Majority
3	Francis Escudero	NPC	Majority
4	Sherwin Gatchalian	NPC	Majority
5	Risa Hontiveros	Akbayan	Majority
6	Panfilo Lacson	Independent	Majority
7	Lito Lapid	NPC	Majority
8	Kiko Pangilinan	Liberal	Majority
9	Tito Sotto	NPC	Majority
10	Raffy Tulfo	Independent	Majority
11	Erwin Tulfo	Lakas	Majority
12	Joel Villanueva	Independent	Minority
13	Juan Miguel Zubiri	Independent	Majority

== Aftermath ==
Former Senate president Tito Sotto was later chosen as president pro tempore, succeeding Gatchalian.
