= May 2026 President of the Senate of the Philippines election =

56th leadership election in the Philippine Senate

- May 11, 2026

All 24 members of the Senate 13 votes needed to win
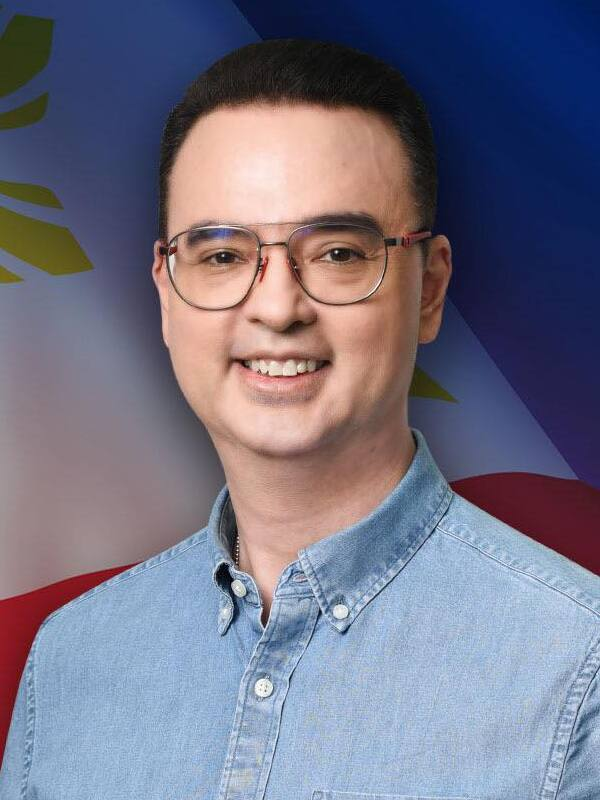

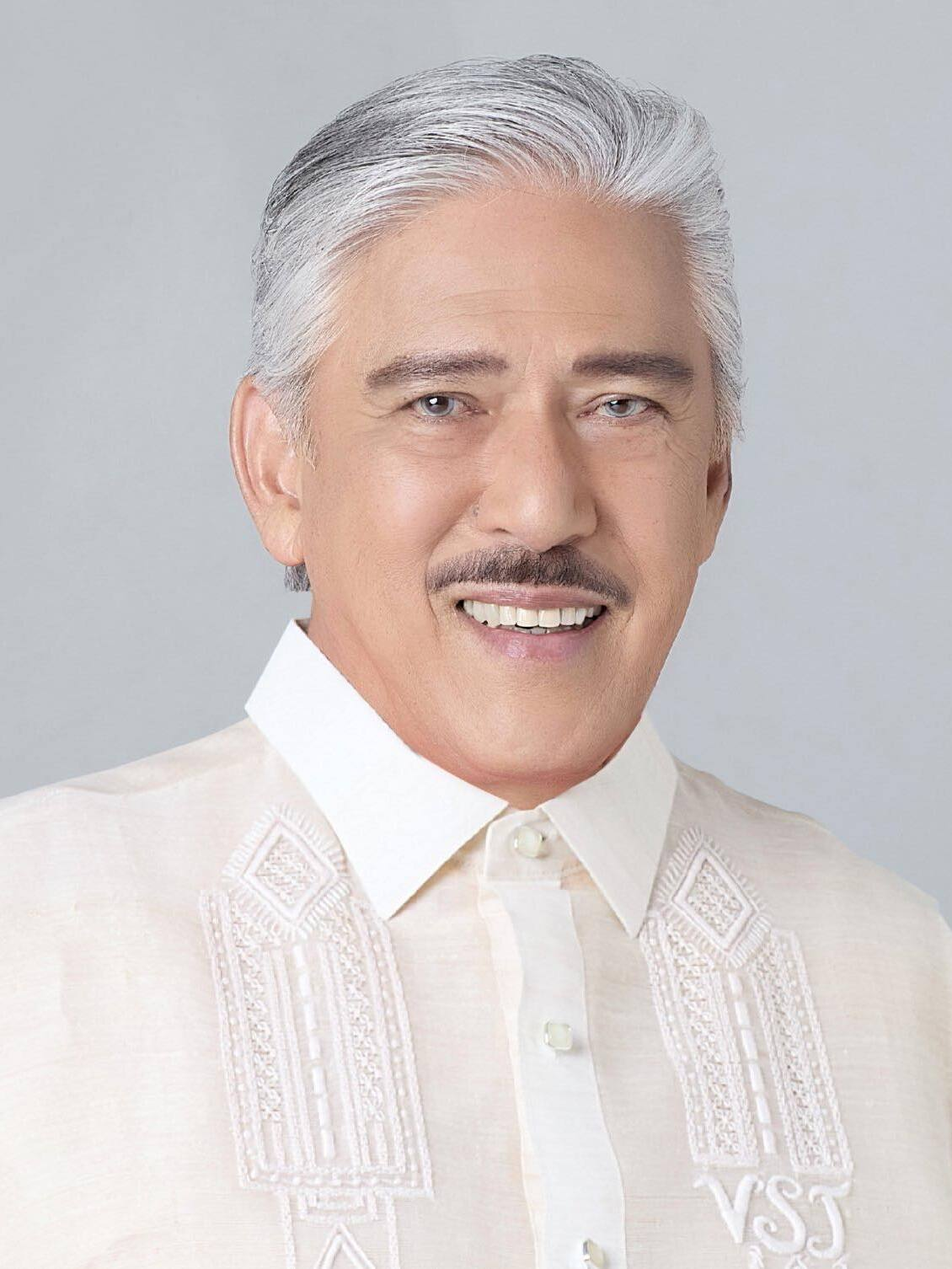
Nominee	Alan Peter Cayetano	Tito Sotto
Party	Independent	NPC
Senatorial vote	13	9
Percentage	54.17%	37.50%
- Bloc composition of the Senate of the Philippines after the election
Senate President before election
Tito Sotto
NPC
Elected Senate President
Alan Peter Cayetano
Independent

An election for the president and president pro tempore of the Senate of the Philippines was suddenly held on May 11, 2026. It was the third leadership election of the Senate in the 20th Congress and the 56th election for the Senate presidency in the chamber's history.

The election removed incumbent Senate president Tito Sotto, who was replaced by Senate Minority Leader Alan Peter Cayetano, triggering a leadership crisis and dispute that would later last for a month.

== Background ==
On September 8, 2025, Senate Minority Leader Sotto replaced incumbent Francis Escudero, and senators Panfilo Lacson and Juan Miguel Zubiri were elected as president pro tempore and majority floor leader, respectively. Escudero was removed due to links with flood control projects. The senators of the minority bloc after that election were called the "Duterte bloc". As early as February 2026, Sotto said that the majority had blocked an alleged attempt by the minority to remove him as the Senate President. Sotto confirmed that senator Loren Legarda would be the next Senate president before the 20th Congress ends in 2028. In May 2026, rumors were rising that the minority was seeking to replace Sotto as the House of Representatives was going to vote on the articles of impeachment against Vice President Sara Duterte and send the case for trial. On May 10, 2026, Sotto confirmed that there was a plan to remove him as president of the Senate.

== Electoral system ==
The Senate president is elected by a majority vote of the members of the Senate from among themselves. Since there are 24 senators, 13 votes are needed to win the Senate presidency, including any vacant seats or senators not attending the session. Although Senate presidents are elected at the start of each Congress, there had been numerous instances of Senate leadership elections in which a sitting Senate president has been unseated in the middle of a session. Term-sharing agreements among senators who are both eyeing the position of the Senate president also played a role in changing the leadership of the Senate, but in a smooth manner, through the peaceful transition of power. Three known instances were in 1999, 2006, and 2018.

Newly elected Senate presidents are traditionally sworn in by the youngest senator, known as the "Benjamin" of the chamber, usually one belonging to the majority bloc, as in the cases of Bam Aquino administering the oath of office to Franklin Drilon in 2013, Manny Pacquiao to Koko Pimentel in 2016, Mark Villar to Francis Escudero in 2024, and Camille Villar to Alan Peter Cayetano in 2026.

Unlike the symbolic presiding officers of upper houses in some other governments, the Senate president of the Philippines has considerable power to influence the legislative agenda, and has a normal vote rather than acting only as a tie-breaker, though the tradition that the presiding officer is the last to vote has been maintained. A tied vote in the Senate therefore means that the motion is lost; the Senate president, having already voted in the normal way, cannot also cast a tie-breaking vote.

== Election ==
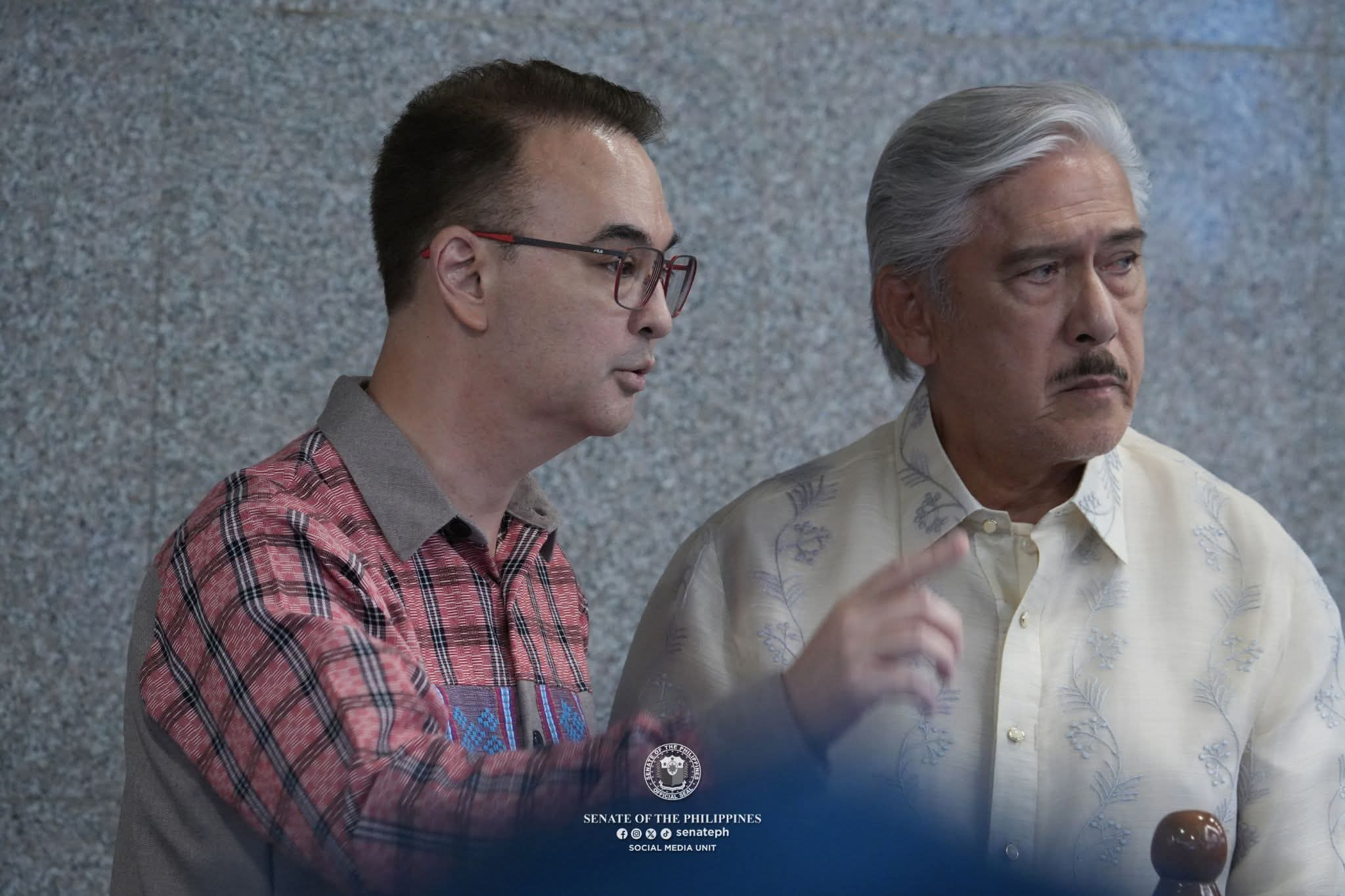
Alan Peter Cayetano (left) with Tito Sotto (right)

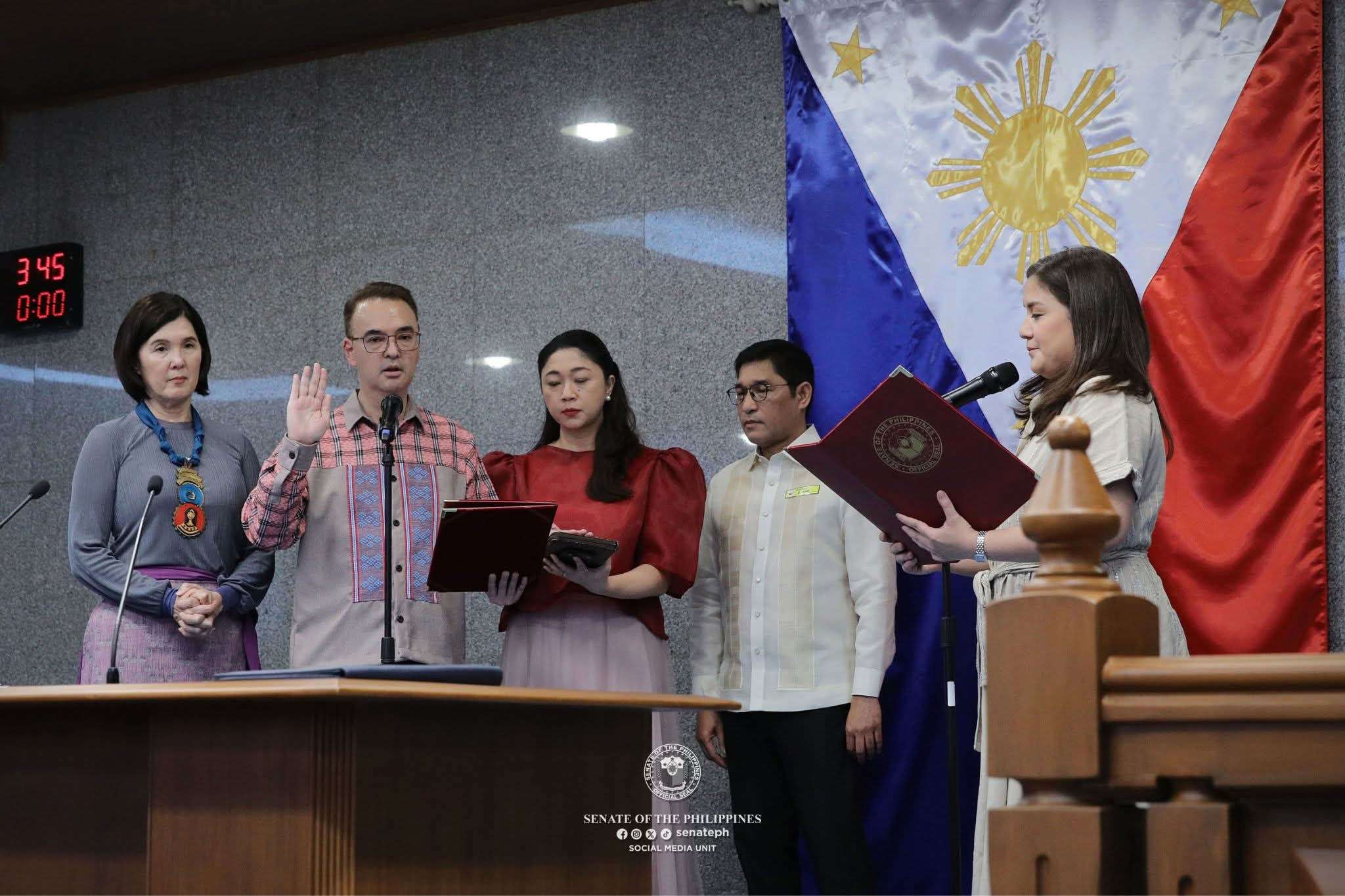
Alan Peter Cayetano (second from the left) with his sister Pia and wife Lani (next to him) taking his oath before Camille Villar (right).

=== Return of Ronald dela Rosa ===
On May 11, 2026, after months long of absence, senator Ronald dela Rosa, who suddenly showed up in the Senate, arrived at the plenary hall and was furious due to him being prevented by National Bureau of Investigation (NBI) agents from entering the ongoing session. This came after rumors that the International Criminal Court (ICC) had filed an arrest warrant due to dela Rosa's links to the Philippine drug war. dela Rosa was also set to be subpoenaed by the Criminal Investigation and Detection Group (CIDG) on the same day as part of an ongoing investigation.

=== Leadership election ===
On May 11, 2026, Cayetano manifested that there were enough votes to support a leadership change which were thirteen "Duterte-aligned" senators led by Cayetano. Immediately after, session was suspended. When it was later resumed, Senate Deputy Minority Leader Joel Villanueva moved to declare all electable seats in the Senate to be vacant. The motion was approved after the voting with 13 senators in favor, 10 against, and one abstaining. Senator Imee Marcos then nominated Cayetano as the new Senate president. Villanueva who was designated as acting majority leader attempted to move to close the nomination but Lacson stood and nominated Sotto for Senate president, causing a two-way race.

=== Results ===
2026 election for president of the Senate
Party	Nominees	Nominated by	Votes	%
Independent	Alan Peter Cayetano	Imee Marcos	13	54.17
NPC	Tito Sotto (incumbent)	Panfilo Lacson	9	37.50
Abstention			2	8.33
Total votes			24	100.00

List of senators who participated in the election
No.	Senator	Party	Original bloc (after the September 2025 election)	Ballot vote cast	New bloc
1	Bam Aquino	KANP	Majority	Sotto	Minority
2	Alan Peter Cayetano	Independent	Minority	Sotto (Note: It is common tradition for senators who are nominees for the Senate presidency to vote for their opponent.)	Majority
3	Pia Cayetano	Nacionalista	Majority	Cayetano	Majority
4	Ronald dela Rosa	PDP	Minority	Cayetano	Majority
5	JV Ejercito	NPC	Majority	Abstained	Independent (Note: Later joined the minority bloc on May 18, 2026)
6	Francis Escudero	NPC	Minority	Cayetano	Majority
7	Jinggoy Estrada	PMP	Minority	Cayetano	Majority
8	Sherwin Gatchalian	NPC	Majority	Sotto	Minority
9	Bong Go	PDP	Minority	Cayetano	Majority
10	Risa Hontiveros	Akbayan	Majority	Sotto	Minority
11	Panfilo Lacson	Independent	Majority	Sotto	Minority
12	Lito Lapid	NPC	Majority	Sotto	Minority
13	Loren Legarda	NPC	Majority	Cayetano	Majority
14	Rodante Marcoleta	Independent	Minority	Cayetano	Majority
15	Imee Marcos	Nacionalista	Minority	Cayetano	Majority
16	Robin Padilla	PDP	Minority	Cayetano	Majority
17	Kiko Pangilinan	Liberal	Majority	Sotto	Minority
18	Tito Sotto	NPC	Majority	Cayetano	Minority
19	Erwin Tulfo	Lakas	Majority	Sotto	Minority
20	Raffy Tulfo	Independent	Majority	Sotto	Minority
21	Joel Villanueva	Independent	Minority	Cayetano	Majority
22	Camille Villar	Nacionalista	Majority	Cayetano	Majority
23	Mark Villar	Nacionalista	Majority	Cayetano	Majority
24	Juan Miguel Zubiri	Independent	Majority	Abstained	Independent

== Aftermath ==
After Cayetano's victory, Senator Legarda was then elected as Senate president pro tempore, a position she previously held in the 19th Congress. Dela Rosa was then placed under Senate protection against NBI agents trying to serve his warrant of arrest allegedly issued by the ICC, which were later confirmed to be true. CCTV footage of dela Rosa running away from NBI agents was then revealed, resulting in dela Rosa spending the night at the Senate office. Senators Sotto, Hontiveros, Aquino, Pangilinan, and Lacson signed a resolution on May 12, 2025, urging dela Rosa to surrender to authorities. Alan Peter Cayetano then said that the senate will only accept arrest warrants from Philippine courts. On May 13, 2026, the CIDG withdrew its subpoena on dela Rosa. On the same day, the Senate was placed under lockdown after gunshots were heard when there were attempts to arrest dela Rosa. Senate President Cayetano later confirmed dela Rosa had escaped the premises of the Senate. Senators Ejercito and Zubiri later joined the minority on May 18, 2026. On May 20, 2026, Senator Pia Cayetano, sister of Alan Peter, turned emotional during a plenary session and confronted her fellow senators of the current minority bloc that they did not ask how members of the majority were doing during the shooting incident. On May 23, 2026, the minority bloc, now called the "Solid Bloc 11" or "SB−11" officially endorsed senator Sherwin Gatchalian for Senate president.
