= 2026 Philippine Senate leadership dispute =

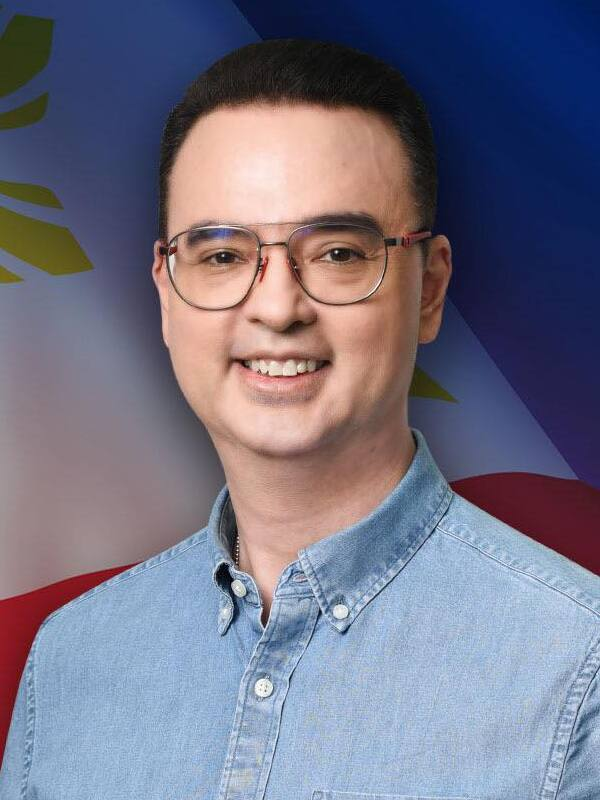
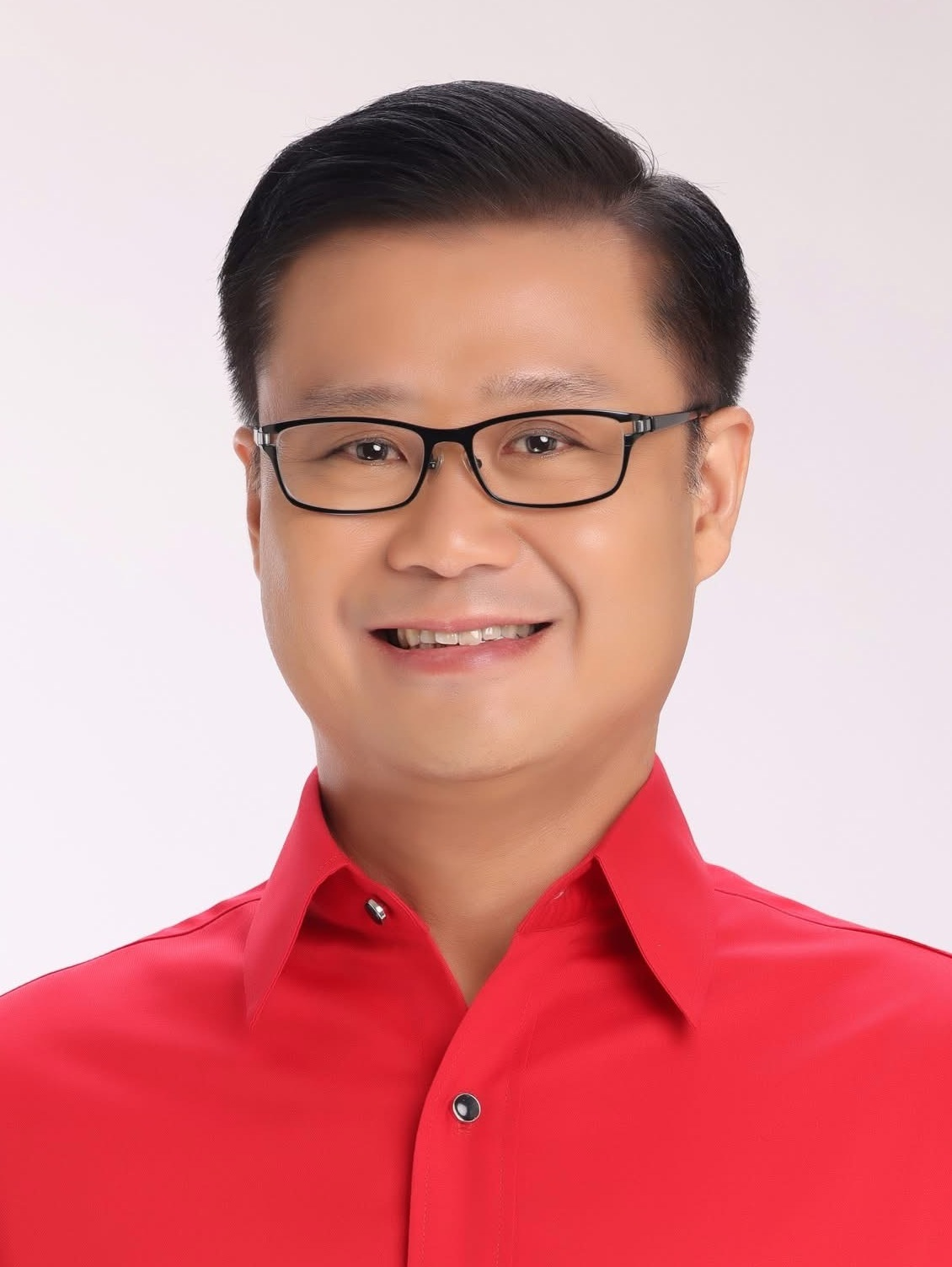
- Senators Alan Peter Cayetano and Sherwin Gatchalian
- Date: May 11, 2026 – June 17, 2026 (Note: The leadership dispute officially began on June 3, 2026, when Senator Francis Escudero joined Sotto’s bloc and elected Sherwin Gatchalian as President pro tempore.)
- Cause: Growing political rivalry between the Marcos and Duterte factions; Second impeachment of Sara Duterte; May 2026 Senate leadership change; Attempts to arrest Ronald dela Rosa; Senate lockdown and shooting; Walkout by 11 senators; Arrest and detention of Senator Jinggoy Estrada
- Motive: Control of Senate leadership; Influence over the impeachment trial of Sara Duterte; Control of the flood control projects scandal investigation; Control of the Blue Ribbon Committee
- Outcome: Senator Francis Escudero joined the Sotto bloc, allowing it to establish a 12-member quorum; Senator Joel Villanueva attended the special session, establishing a constitutional 13-member quorum; June 2026 President of the Senate of the Philippines election

Beginning on May 11, 2026, the Senate of the Philippines has experienced a political deadlock, impasse and leadership dispute (Note: Attributed to multiple sources:) following the removal of Senator Tito Sotto as the president of the Senate and the election of Senator Alan Peter Cayetano on the same day Vice President Sara Duterte was impeached for the second time by the House of Representatives.

On June 3, 2026, Senator Francis Escudero joined Sotto's bloc, enabling them to form a quorum citing the 1949 Supreme Court ruling in Avelino v. Cuenco, which set the quorum at 12 members. With this, they proceeded to reorganize the Senate leadership, declaring all leadership positions vacant, and president pro tempore Sherwin Gatchalian stepped in as acting Senate president.

The dispute ended on June 17, 2026, when Senator Cayetano conceded the Senate leadership to president pro tempore Gatchalian after Senator Joel Villanueva attended a special session called by President Bongbong Marcos to resolve the impasse from the June 1–3 session. With 13 members present to form a constitutional quorum, Senator Gatchalian finally assumed the Senate presidency, with all 13 members of the new majority voting in acclamation.

This marked the first time in the history of the Philippine Senate that five leadership changes occurred during a single Congress, with the presidency decided in a special session.

== Background ==
Political tensions in the Senate of the Philippines intensified during the first half of 2026 amid the growing rivalry between supporters of President Bongbong Marcos and Vice President Sara Duterte. Following the deterioration of the UniTeam, disputes emerged over control of key government institutions, including House of Representatives and the Senate.

=== May 2026 President of the Senate election ===
On May 11, 2026, the House of Representatives votes to impeach Vice President Sara Duterte for a second time, transmitting the articles of impeachment to the Senate for trial. On the same day, the Senate undergoes a sudden leadership change, with Senator Alan Peter Cayetano replacing Senate President Tito Sotto following a 13–9 vote among senators, when Senator Ronald dela Rosa appeared after 6 months of absence.

=== Attempts to arrest Senator Ronald dela Rosa ===
Just two days in office, tensions escalate inside the Senate complex which is placed under lockdown amid security operations involving law enforcement agencies. Armed personnel are deployed around and inside the premises following reports of an attempted arrest linked to Senator Ronald dela Rosa, who is under heightened legal scrutiny related to an International Criminal Court warrant. Later that evening, a shooting incident occurs inside the Senate building, with at least 30 gunshots reported during the lockdown. On May 14, 2026, Dela Rosa slipped out of the Senate premises with Senator Robin Padilla and aides, leaving in a vehicle.

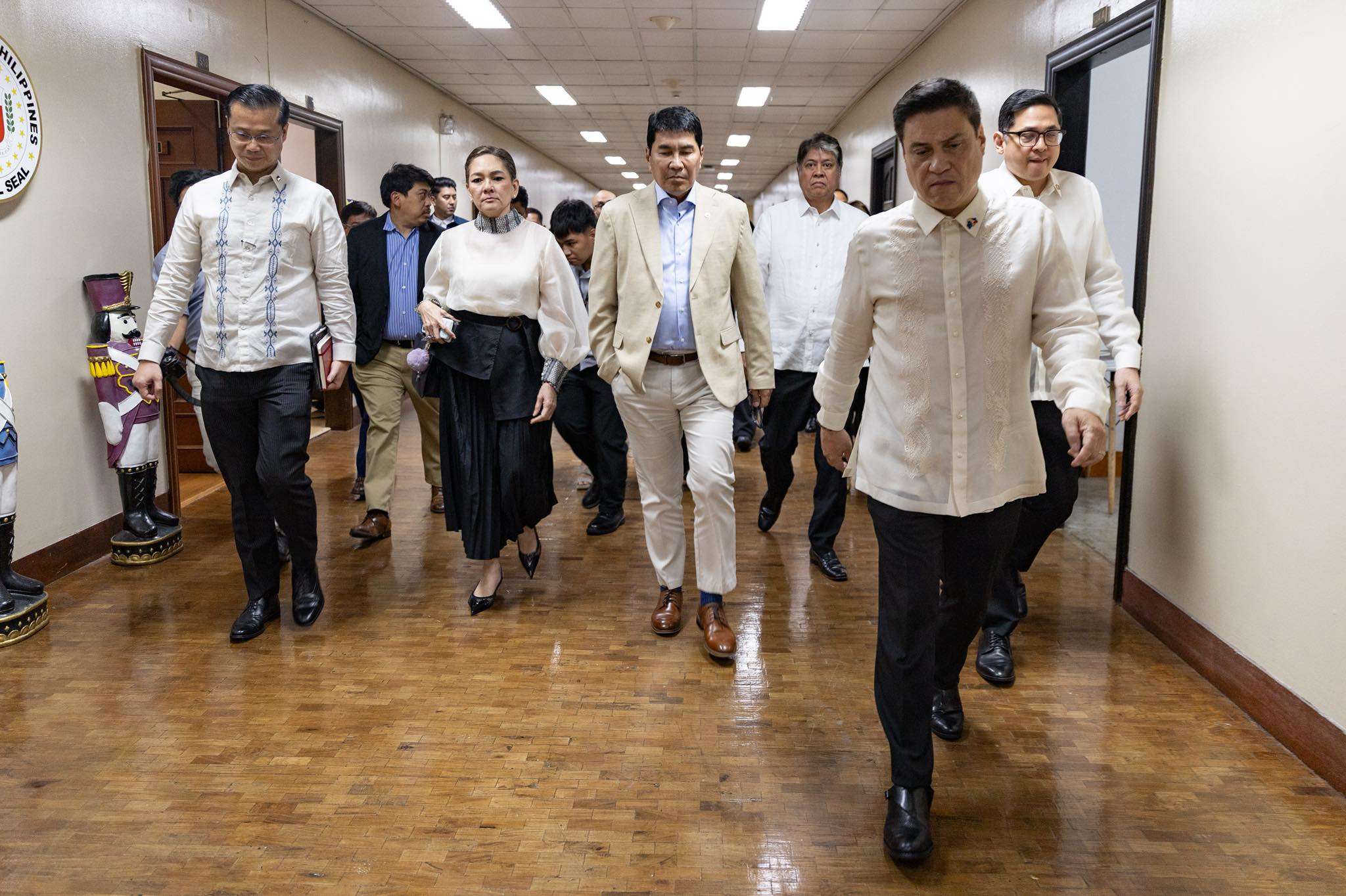
Members of the minority bloc walked out on May 26, 2026 after they clashed with the majority over proposals to allow senators to vote in Senate sessions using teleconference methods.

=== Minority Senate walkout ===
On May 26, 2026, ten of the eleven members of the then-Sotto minority bloc walked out during a senate session after a heated debate with senators of the Cayetano majority bloc of attempting to amend the rules of the Senate and allowing senators to vote in senate sessions using teleconference methods. Under prevailing Senate rules, Senators can only vote on matters (including voting in the Impeachment Court) while physically present within the plenary hall. They can only vote remotely in cases of force majeure or the occurrence of a national emergency as determined by the majority of all the members of the Senate.

Marcoleta proposes the following amendment to the Senate rules:

Allow a senator for justifiable reasons to attend and participate in the session through teleconference, video conference, or other reliable forms of remote or electronic means, using appropriate information and communications technology.

— Section 41 (c) – proposed addition

During Senate Session number 68, presided over by Senate President pro tempore Loren Legarda, started at 15:04 PHT. Senate President Cayetano moved to immediately consider the proposal of Marcoleta about remote voting. When the motion was taken out, there was no constituted Philippine Senate Committee on Rules and no elected Majority Leader. Senator Panfilo Lacson questioned if the motion would be passed to the Committee on Rules and back to the plenary, adding that there were no members of the Committee on Rules. Senator Erwin Tulfo followed with another question, asking why the proposal was rushed; Tulfo asked if it was to favor the members of the majority who were facing corruption issues, so that, if they were proven guilty, they could still vote. Senators Risa Hontiveros and Rodante Marcoleta engaged in a debate about Hontiveros' legal background and the motion.

In a joint statement, Minority Senator Juan Miguel Zubiri said that several members of the minority still wanted to speak and raise "serious questions" on the floor, adding that a measure like this "should be opened to healthy public debate instead of being rushed by the tyranny of the majority". Lacson was the first to walk out of the plenary hall. Zubiri encouraged the others—Bam Aquino, Sherwin Gatchalian, Hontiveros, Francis Pangilinan and Tulfo—to follow suit.

Senate Minority Leader Tito Sotto stayed. Concluding that the quorum has been broken, Sotto made a motion to adjourn, or a "quorum call". Cayetano, speaking for the majority stated they will not object but remarked how the minority bloc "scampered out".

==== Force majeure argument ====
On May 27, 2026, Senator Robin Padilla argued that the Middle Eastern crisis, the China–Taiwan crisis, and the effects of El Niño constituted force majeure. He argued that, under such circumstances, absent senators, including Ronald dela Rosa, could participate and vote remotely in Senate proceedings.

However, Padilla's remarks drew criticism on social media. President Bongbong Marcos also dismissed the proposal on May 29, 2026, during a press conference in Tokyo. He said it appeared to have been intended to accommodate dela Rosa and urged the senator to appear in person if he needed to vote.

=== Arrest and detention of Senator Jinggoy Estrada ===
In the days following the leadership change, Senate proceedings continue under heightened political tension. On June 1, 2026, Senator Jinggoy Estrada is arrested on a plunder charge related to alleged misuse of public funds, further affecting the composition of the chamber, reducing Cayetano's bloc into 10 seats. This led to the boycott of the majority bloc as a protest to the arrest of Estrada, putting the Senate into impasse leading to interruptions of pending bills and legislation.

== Senate control ==
On June 3, President Bongbong Marcos called on senators to return to work, warning that the impasse has disrupted essential legislative functions and undermined government efforts to address pressing national concerns. The President stated that the administration was exploring all legal and constitutional options to address the situation, but depending on the cooperation and commitment of the Senate leadership.

=== June 3: Election of Sherwin Gatchalian as acting Senate president ===
A quorum was made after Francis Escudero appeared to join the session.

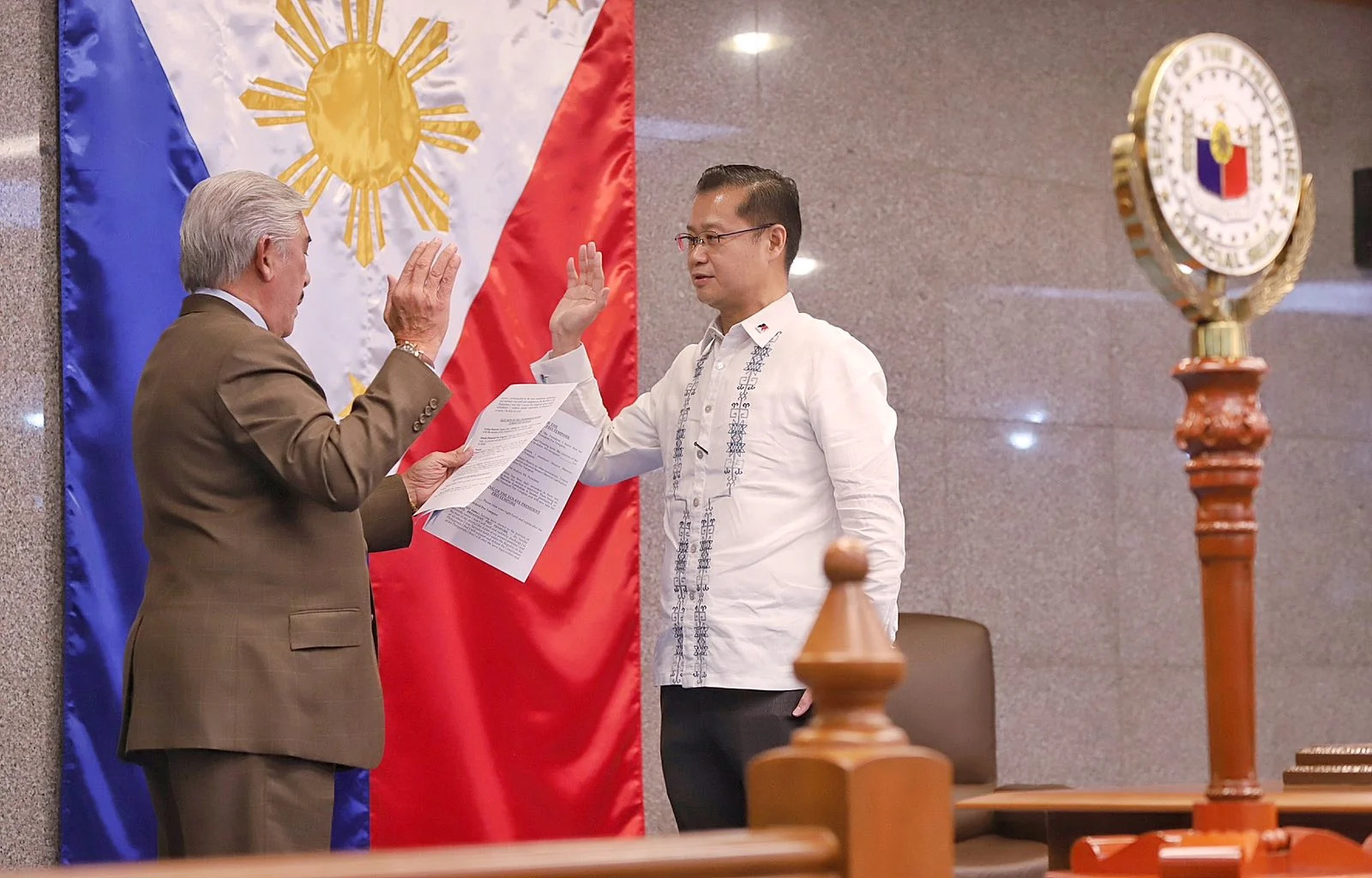
Sherwin Gatchalian (right) is sworn in by Tito Sotto (left) as the new president pro tempore of the Senate on June 3, 2026. Gatchalian was later designated as acting Senate president.

On June 1 and 2, 2026, the Senate experienced a two-day legislative impasse when Cayetano and the members of the majority failed to attend the scheduled sessions of those days, after the arrest of Senator Jinggoy Estrada on Senate premises. The following day, on June 3, Senator Escudero joined the eleven members of the Senate minority to establish a quorum of twelve senators. Secretary of the Senate Jose Luis Montales was called upon by presiding officer Sherwin Gatchalian to conduct the roll call but refused to do so. This prompted Gatchalian to direct instead deputy Secretary Marivic Garcia, who proceeded to call the roll. After the roll call, the new majority motioned to declare all leadership positions vacant, unseating Cayetano and Legarda from their offices, and electing Senator Gatchalian as Senate president pro tempore and acting Senate president, as a 13-seat Senate quorum is required for an election of a permanent Senate president. Senator Juan Miguel Zubiri became Senate Majority Leader. Zubiri nominated Renato Bantug Jr. to the post of Secretary of the Senate and Alfredo S. Corpuz as Senate Sergeant-at-Arms, who were both sworn in by Gatchalian. The senate was thereafter adjourned sine die of its first regular session.

Gatchalian, following his election as President pro tempore, argued that a valid quorum existed to depose Cayetano and Legarda, as the new majority counted 12 out of 22 effective senators, following the arrest of Estrada with Senator Bato dela Rosa beyond the Senate's reach due to an arrest warrant issued by the International Criminal Court, citing the following precedents:

- the 1949 Supreme Court ruling Avelino v. Cuenco, where Senator Mariano Cuenco was elected as acting Senate president over Senate President José Avelino, on a quorum of 12 out of 23 senators (one senator Tomas Confesor was in the United States at the time and out of the Senate's jurisdiction to compel attendance). The Supreme Court upheld Cuenco's election as valid, after Avelino filed a quo warranto petition before the Supreme Court asking the Court to declare him the rightful Senate president.
- a 2015 Senate precedent, where then-Senate President Franklin Drilon called a quorum with just 12 senators present on May 5, 2015, as Senators Jinggoy Estrada, Bong Revilla and Juan Ponce Enrile were in custody following the pork barrel scam, with another 4 senators out of the country at that time.

Gatchalian also stated that the Senate was on the brink of constitutional violation due to not informing the lower house that the Senate would cancel sessions due to the absences of the former majority.

Malacañang Palace and the House of Representatives under Speaker Bojie Dy released statements recognizing Gatchalian as acting Senate president and the "new majority" in the Senate. Former Senate president Franklin Drilon also called Gatchalian as the 'valid' Senate acting president unless the Supreme Court says otherwise.

Both Cayetano and Legarda disputed the election and continue to claim their posts as Senate president and Senate president pro tempore, respectively.

=== June 4: Blue Ribbon Committee hearing ===
A day after, June 4, 2026, disputes over Senate leadership and committee chairmanship intensified following conflicting claims of authority over the Senate Blue Ribbon Committee’s scheduled hearing on alleged flood control irregularities. The committee hearing proceeded despite disagreements over its legitimacy, with Senator Pia Cayetano presiding over the session under the Cayetano-aligned bloc, while Senator Erwin Tulfo, who had been designated chairperson following the reorganization of committee leadership, stated that the hearing was not valid and should be considered postponed or without official authority. Sotto also said that the hearing was "unofficial and unauthorized".

== Aftermath ==
On June 17, following the appearance of Senator Joel Villanueva to the senate floor, the majority threshold for a quorum and the election of the Presidency of the Senate was called into order. Senate President pro tempore Sherwin Gatchalian –– nominated by Majority Leader Juan Miguel Zubiri –– was elected President of the Senate by acclamation and was sworn-in by the three former senate presidents before him, Senator Vicente Sotto III, Senator Francis Escudero and the aforementioned Juan Miguel Zubiri. Former senate president pro tempore Panfilo Lacson then nominated Vicente Sotto III to the position of president pro tempore. In his manifestation, he recognized the duly commendable actions made by Escudero and Villanueva to join the new senate majority and their commitment to restoring order in the chamber. Similarly to Gatchalian, Sotto was elected by acclamation.
