= President pro tempore of the Senate of the Philippines =

Second highest-ranking official of the Senate of the Philippines

- Pangulong pro tempore ng Senado ng Pilipinas
- Seal of the Senate of the Philippines

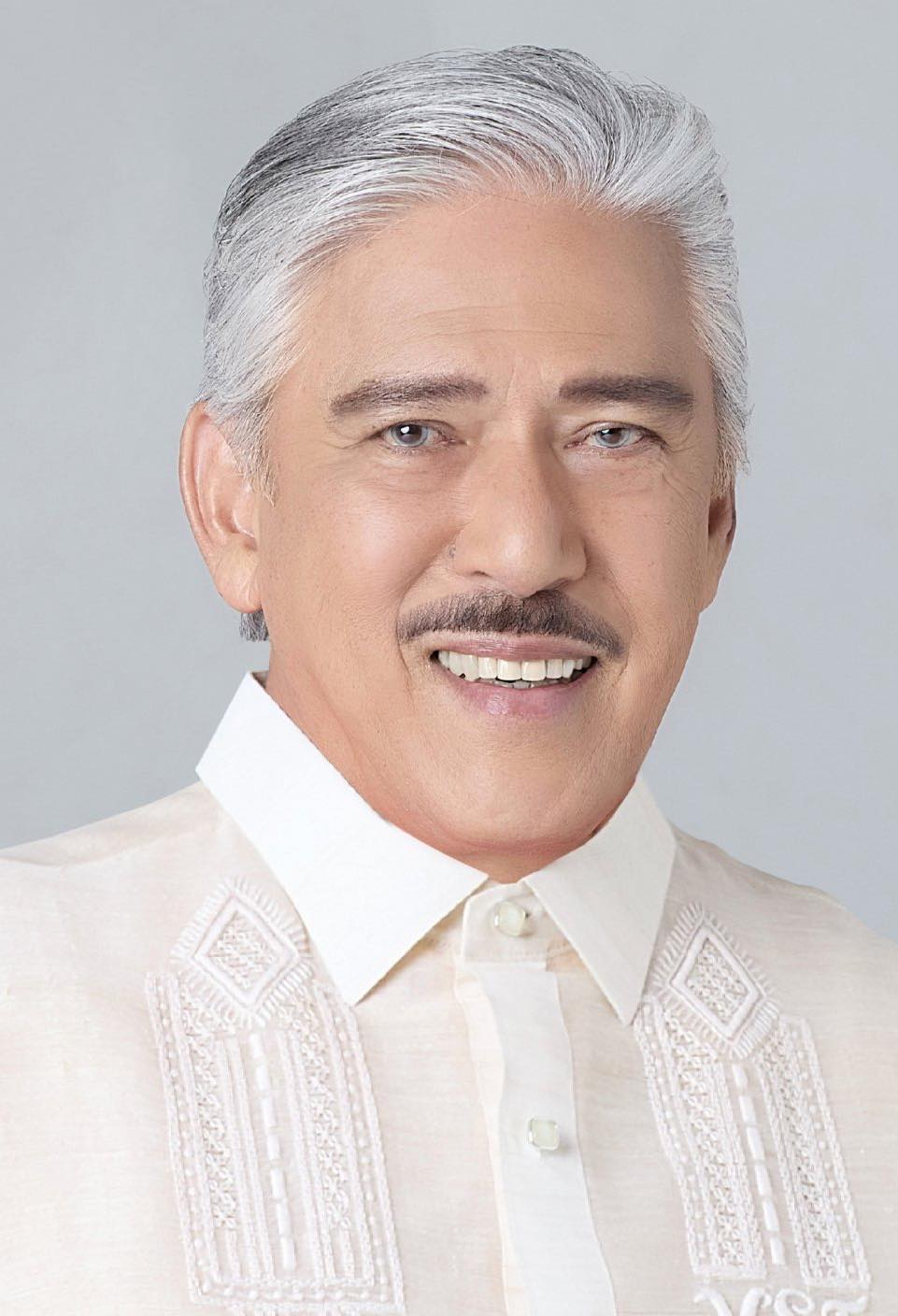
- Incumbent; Tito Sotto since June 17, 2026
- Senate of the Philippines
- Style: Mister President (when presiding); The Honorable (formal)
- Seat: GSIS Building, Pasay
- Appointer: Elected by the Senate
- Term length: At the Senate's pleasure; elected at the beginning of the new Congress by a majority of the senators-elect, and upon a vacancy during a Congress.
- Inaugural holder: Rafael Palma
- Formation: 1916; 110 years ago
- Website: Senate of the Philippines

The president pro tempore of the Senate of the Philippines (Filipino: Pangulong pro tempore ng Senado ng Pilipinas) is the second highest-ranking official of the Senate of the Philippines. During the absence of the president of the Senate, the president pro tempore presides over the Senate.

By tradition, the president pro tempore is elected by a majority vote immediately after the Senate president during the opening of a new Congress, or whenever the position becomes vacant, whether through a motion or the incumbent's resignation. Although the American custom of electing the most senior member of the majority party as the president pro tempore is not exclusively followed, there have been instances in past Senates when senior members of the majority party have been elected to the position.

The incumbent president pro tempore of the Senate of the Philippines is Tito Sotto since June 17, 2026.

== Powers and duties ==
According to Rule IV, Section 4 of the Rules of the Senate, the president pro tempore is mandated to discharge the powers and duties of the Senate president in the following cases:

- a. When the President is absent for one or more days;
- b. When the President is temporarily incapacitated; or
- c. In the event of the resignation, removal, death or absolute incapacity of the President.

Section 5 further notes that the president pro tempore shall serve as acting president in cases specified in Section 4(c) until the Senate elects a new president.

Section 20 of Rule X of the Senate Rules also provide that along with the floor leaders, the president pro tempore is an ex officio member of all permanent committees, and may also be elected chairperson of any of the committees.

== History ==
=== Pre-martial law period ===
The Philippine Senate unanimously elected Rafael Palma as its first president pro tempore upon its establishment in 1916. He was succeeded by Espiridion Guanco in the 5th Legislature. Sergio Osmeña became the first president pro tempore to serve as acting Senate president when Manuel Quezon went ill in 1930. He is also the longest to serve as president pro tempore in Senate history. In 1932, José Clarín acted as the Senate president when Quezon went on leave. Upon Clarín's death in 1935, José Avelino would briefly serve as president pro tempore until the Senate was abolished in favor of a unicameral National Assembly.

The Senate was then restored by the constitutional amendment in 1940, but senators elected in 1941 were not able to assume office due to the outbreak of World War II. Congress would only reconvene by 1945, and Elpidio Quirino was elected as president pro tempore alongside Manuel Roxas as Senate president. When the Senate encountered multiple deadlocks in electing a new Senate president at the start of the 2nd Congress in January 1952, president pro tempore Quintín Paredes presided over the sessions until March 5, 1952, when he was formally elected president of the Senate after Felisberto Verano of the Nacionalista Party voted for him, a member of the Liberal Party.

Jose Roy served as the last president pro tempore of the Senate when it was abolished for a second time in 1972 upon the declaration of martial law.

=== Fifth Republic ===
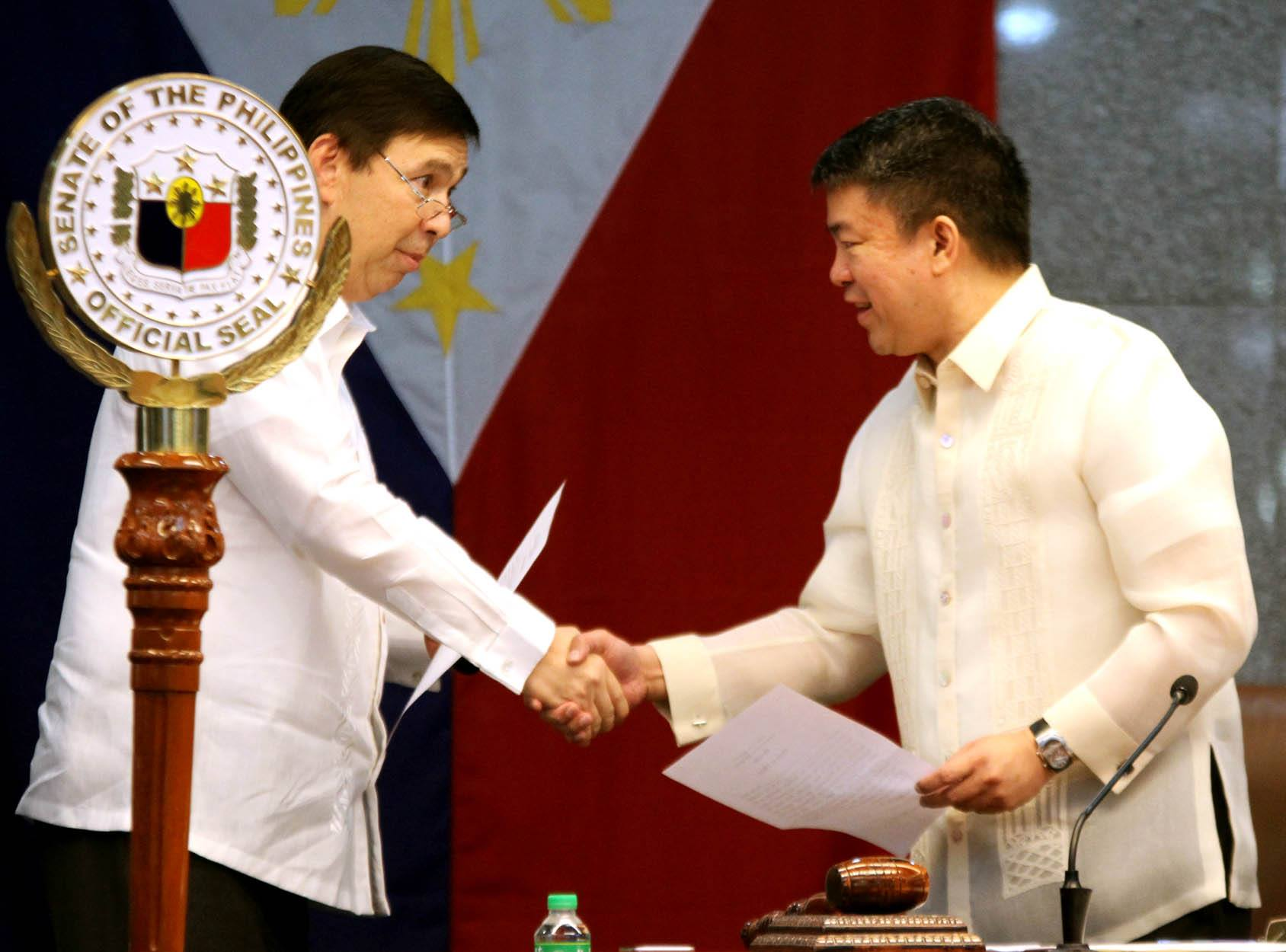
Senate President Koko Pimentel (right) congratulates Ralph Recto (left) after his election as president pro tempore of the Senate on February 27, 2017.

Teofisto Guingona Jr. served as president pro tempore of the reestablished Senate from 1987 to 1990, and was succeeded by Sotero Laurel.

In 1993, the Senate elected Leticia Ramos-Shahani as its first female president pro tempore. Ramos-Shahani was the first female lawmaker in history to serve as a deputy presiding officer in either houses of Congress. When Marcelo Fernan resigned the Senate presidency in June 1999 due to failing health, president pro tempore Blas Ople was designated as acting presiding officer, until he himself was elected president nearly a month later. Franklin Drilon was temporarily designated by Fernan as the Senate's officer-in-charge before Ople's return from a trip to Switzerland and his assumption as the chamber's acting president.

On August 12, 2002, Manny Villar stepped down as president pro tempore to be elected chairperson of the Senate committees on finance and foreign relations. Juan Flavier was subsequently elected to succeed Villar.

Juan Ponce Enrile resigned as Senate president on June 5, 2013. President pro tempore Jinggoy Estrada served as acting president until Franklin Drilon was elected president of the Senate on July 22, 2013. Drilon, who had earlier served as president pro tempore under Senate president Koko Pimentel, was later removed from the position along with other Liberal Party senators from their committee chairmanships following a motion by Manny Pacquiao to declare the post vacant. He was succeeded by Ralph Recto, a fellow Liberal and former minority leader, who had previously served as Drilon's president pro tempore during the 16th Congress.

In June 2022, Juan Miguel Zubiri became the first majority floor leader to concurrently serve as president pro tempore after he was elected to the position to allow the Senate to discharge its administrative functions without interruption while then-Senate president Tito Sotto was nearing the end of his term. Loren Legarda, then the most senior senator in the 19th Congress, was elected on July 25, 2022, as the second female Senate president pro tempore.

On September 8, 2025, Panfilo Lacson was elected president pro tempore of the Senate, the oldest senator in history to assume the position. Legarda succeeded Lacson in an election on May 11, 2026, her second time serving in the position.

On June 3, 2026, Sherwin Gatchalian was elected president pro tempore, replacing Loren Legarda. The 11-member minority bloc, together with Senator Francis Escudero, was present during the day's session, constituting a quorum of 12 out of the 22 senators then under the Senate's jurisdiction, excluding detained senator Jinggoy Estrada and Ronald dela Rosa, who is in hiding following the issuance of an arrest warrant by the International Criminal Court. Gatchalian, who served as temporary presiding officer prior to his election, cited Avelino v. Cuenco, a Supreme Court decision that resolved a dispute concerning the Senate presidency.

On June 17, 2026, Gatchalian was formally elected Senate president, and Tito Sotto succeeded him as president pro tempore, becoming the second-oldest senator to serve in the position.

== List of Senate presidents pro tempore ==
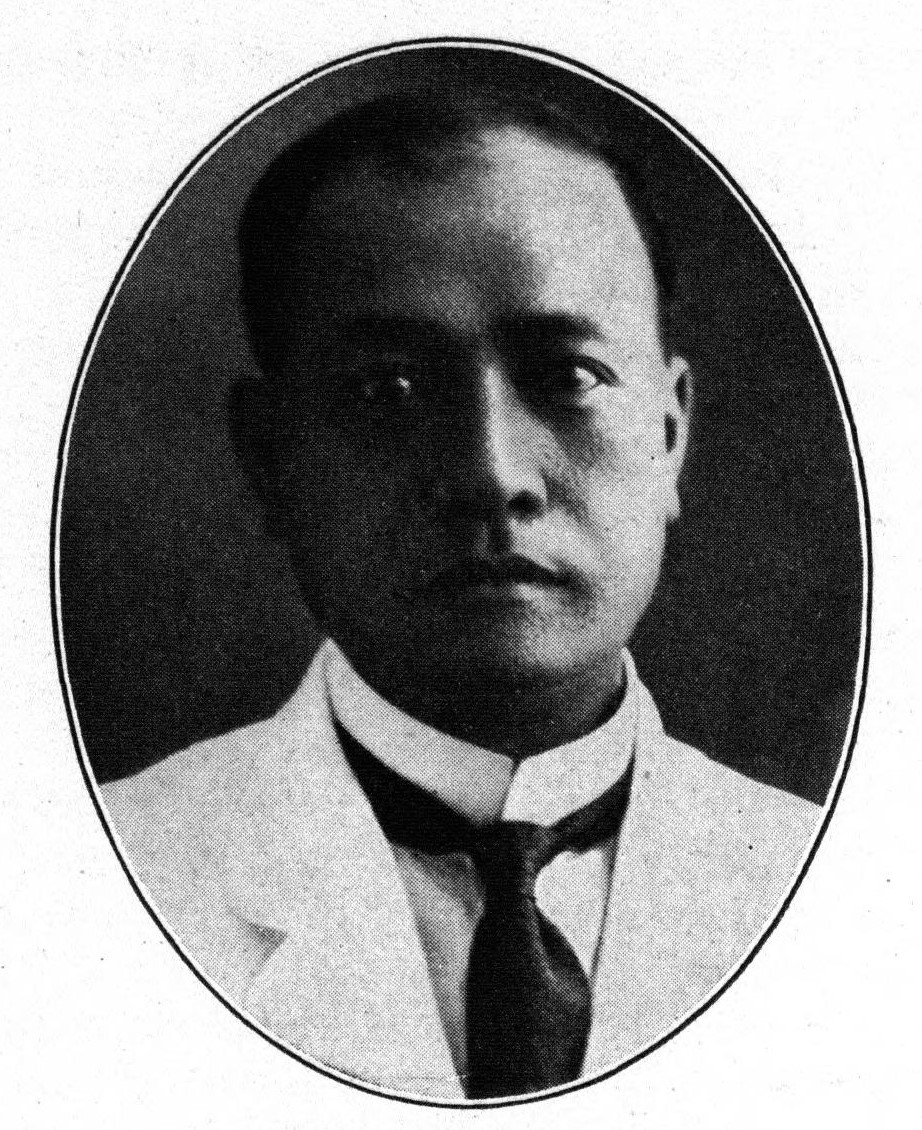
Rafael Palma was the first president pro tempore of the Senate.

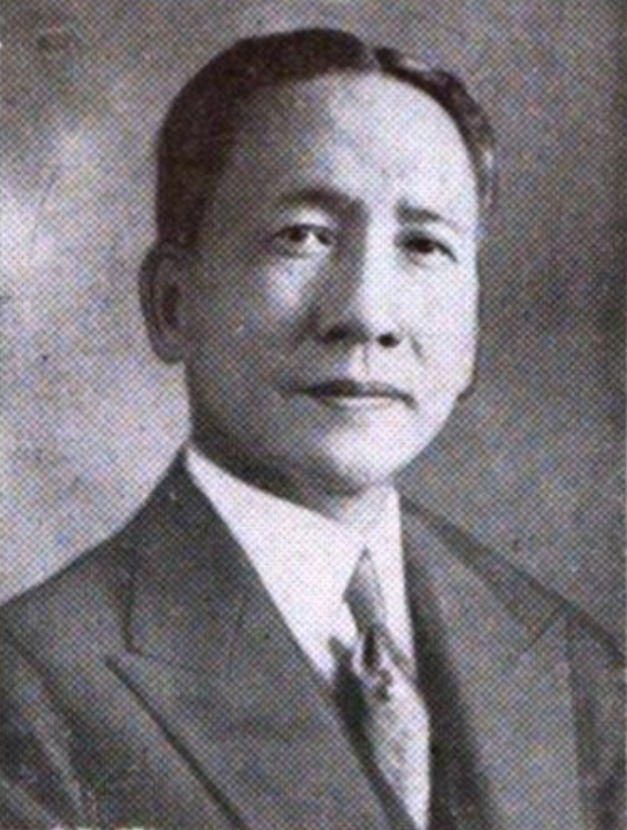
Sergio Osmeña was the longest-serving president pro tempore of the Senate.

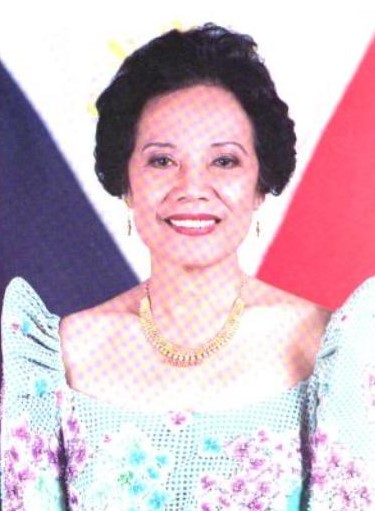
Leticia Ramos-Shahani was the first female president pro tempore of the Senate.

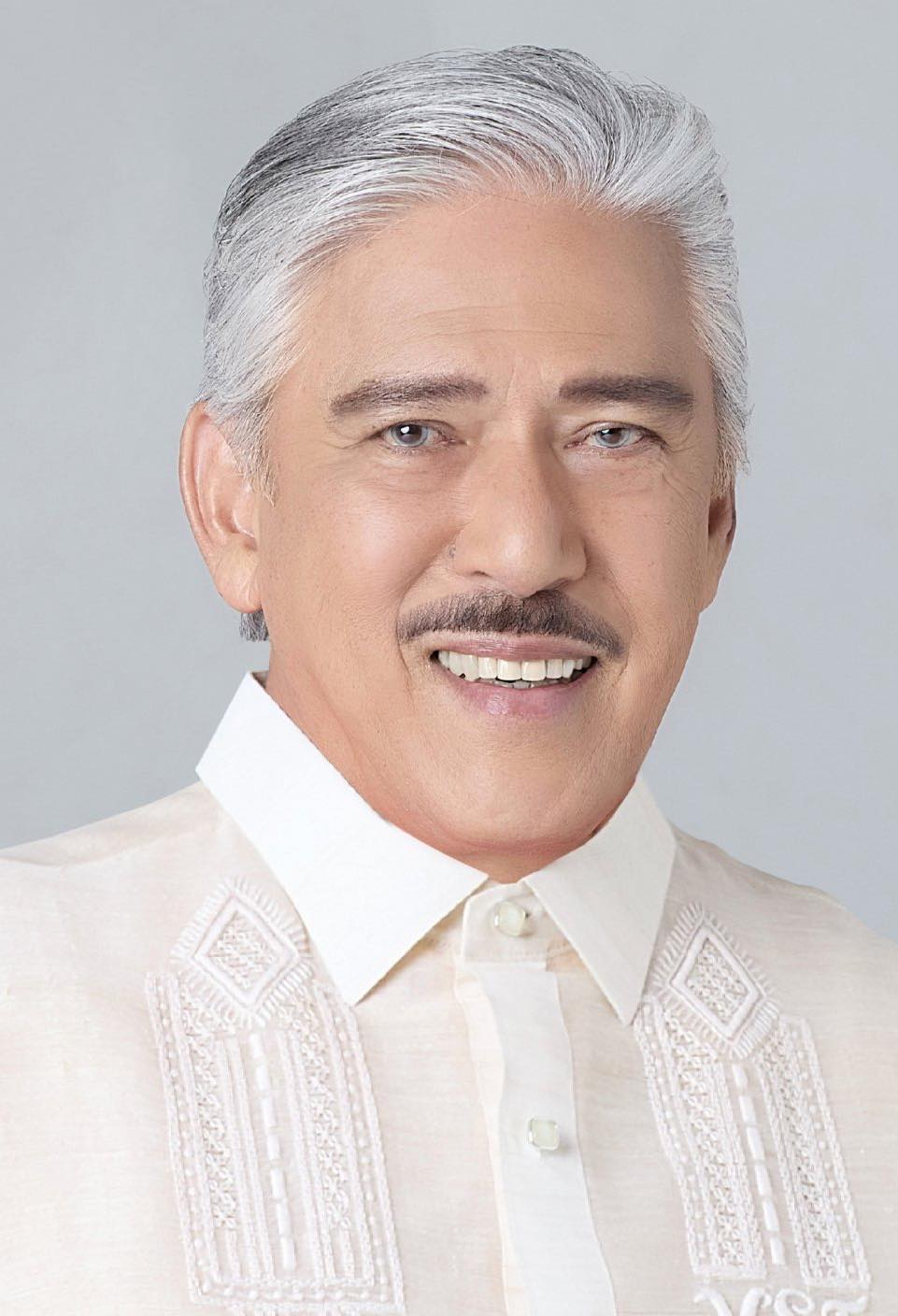
Tito Sotto is the current president pro tempore of the Senate.

Since the office was established in 1916, 32 individuals are known to have served as president pro tempore of the Senate.

All senators from 1941 onwards were elected at-large, with the whole Philippines as one constituency. Every president pro tempore of the Senate has been a member of a political party or faction; the number affiliated with each is:

Nacionalista – 12; (Note: Includes the tenures of Sergio Osmeña from 1925 to 1933, José Clarín from 1933 to 1934, Elpidio Quirino from 1945 to 1946, and Ralph Recto from 2018 to 2022.) Liberal – 8; (Note: Includes the tenures of Elpidio Quirino in 1946, Teofisto Guingona Jr. from 1987 to 1990, and Ralph Recto from 2013 to 2016 and 2017 to 2018.) NPC – 4; Lakas – 2; LDP – 3; (Note: Includes the tenure of Teofisto Guingona Jr. in 1993.) Nacionalista Democratico – 2; (Note: Includes the tenure of José Clarín from 1934 to 1935.) Nacionalista Unipersonalista – 1; (Note: Includes the tenure of Sergio Osmeña from 1922 to 1925.) PMP – 1; Independent – 3.

No.	Portrait	Name (Birth–Death)	Term of office		Party/Coalition	Senate President	Legislature
No.	Portrait	Name (Birth–Death)	Took office	Left office	Party/Coalition	Senate President	Legislature
1		Rafael Palma; Senator for the 4th District (1874–1939)	October 16, 1916	c. 1919 (Note: It is unclear when Rafael Palma's tenure as president pro tempore ended. One source states that Espiridion Guanco had been serving as president pro tempore as early as March 1919, during the 4th Legislature. In one of his own accounts, Palma stated that he was still serving as president pro tempore in 1921.)	Nacionalista	Manuel L. Quezon	4th Legislature
2		Espiridion Guanco; Senator for the 8th District (1874–1925)	c. 1919	October 27, 1922	Nacionalista	Manuel L. Quezon	5th Legislature
3		Sergio Osmeña; Senator for the 10th District (1878–1961)	October 27, 1922	August 2, 1933	Nacionalista Unipersonalista (until 1925)	Manuel L. Quezon	6th Legislature
3		Sergio Osmeña; Senator for the 10th District (1878–1961)	October 27, 1922	August 2, 1933	Nacionalista Consolidado (from 1925)	Manuel L. Quezon	7th Legislature
3		Sergio Osmeña; Senator for the 10th District (1878–1961)	October 27, 1922	August 2, 1933	Nacionalista Consolidado (from 1925)	Manuel L. Quezon	8th Legislature
3		Sergio Osmeña; Senator for the 10th District (1878–1961)	October 27, 1922	August 2, 1933	Nacionalista Consolidado (from 1925)	Manuel L. Quezon	9th Legislature
4		José Clarín; Senator for the 11th District (1879–1935)	August 2, 1933	June 2, 1935	Nacionalista (until 1934)	Manuel L. Quezon	9th Legislature
4		José Clarín; Senator for the 11th District (1879–1935)	August 2, 1933	June 2, 1935	Nacionalista Democratico (from 1934)	Manuel L. Quezon	10th Legislature
5		José Avelino; Senator for the 9th District (1890–1986)	June 2, 1935	November 15, 1935	Nacionalista Democratico	Manuel L. Quezon	10th Legislature
Senate abolished (November 15, 1935 – June 9, 1945)
6		Elpidio Quirino (1890–1956)	June 9, 1945	May 28, 1946	Nacionalista (until 1946)	Manuel Roxas	1st Commonwealth Congress
6		Elpidio Quirino (1890–1956)	June 9, 1945	May 28, 1946	Liberal (from 1946)	Manuel Roxas	1st Commonwealth Congress
7		Melecio Arranz (1888–1966)	May 28, 1946	December 30, 1949	Liberal	José Avelino	2nd Commonwealth Congress
7		Melecio Arranz (1888–1966)	May 28, 1946	December 30, 1949	Liberal	José Avelino	1st Congress
7		Melecio Arranz (1888–1966)	May 28, 1946	December 30, 1949	Liberal	Mariano Cuenco	1st Congress
8		Quintín Paredes (1884–1973)	January 31, 1950	March 5, 1952	Liberal	Mariano Cuenco	2nd Congress
9		Esteban Abada (1896–1954)	March 5, 1952	May 7, 1952	Liberal	Quintín Paredes	2nd Congress
9		Esteban Abada (1896–1954)	March 5, 1952	May 7, 1952	Liberal	Camilo Osías	2nd Congress
9		Esteban Abada (1896–1954)	March 5, 1952	May 7, 1952	Liberal	Eulogio Rodriguez	2nd Congress
10		Manuel Briones (1896–1957)	May 7, 1952	April 17, 1953	Nacionalista	Eulogio Rodriguez	2nd Congress
11		Jose Zulueta (1889–1972)	April 17, 1953	April 30, 1953	Nacionalista	Camilo Osías	2nd Congress
12		Manuel Briones (1896–1957)	April 30, 1953	September 29, 1957	Nacionalista	Jose Zulueta	2nd Congress
12		Manuel Briones (1896–1957)	April 30, 1953	September 29, 1957	Nacionalista	Eulogio Rodriguez	2nd Congress
12		Manuel Briones (1896–1957)	April 30, 1953	September 29, 1957	Nacionalista	Eulogio Rodriguez	3rd Congress
Vacant (Note: Position vacant during the Senate’s adjournment sine die after Manuel Briones died on September 29, 1957.) (September 29, 1957 – January 27, 1958)						Eulogio Rodriguez	3rd Congress
13		Fernando Lopez (1904–1993)	January 27, 1958	December 30, 1965	Nacionalista	Eulogio Rodriguez	4th Congress
13		Fernando Lopez (1904–1993)	January 27, 1958	December 30, 1965	Nacionalista	Eulogio Rodriguez	5th Congress
13		Fernando Lopez (1904–1993)	January 27, 1958	December 30, 1965	Nacionalista	Ferdinand Marcos	5th Congress
14		Lorenzo Sumulong (1905–1997)	January 17, 1966	January 26, 1967	Nacionalista	Arturo Tolentino	6th Congress
15		Camilo Osías (1889–1976)	January 26, 1967	December 30, 1967	Liberal	Gil Puyat	6th Congress
16		Jose Roy (1904–1986)	January 22, 1968	January 17, 1973	Nacionalista	Gil Puyat	6th Congress
16		Jose Roy (1904–1986)	January 22, 1968	January 17, 1973	Nacionalista	Gil Puyat	7th Congress
Senate abolished (Note: The ratification of the 1973 Constitution abolished the Senate, and a unicameral legislature was established, later known as the Batasang Pambansa.) (January 17, 1973 – February 2, 1987)
17		Teofisto Guingona Jr. (born 1928)	July 27, 1987	July 23, 1990	Liberal	Jovito Salonga	8th Congress
18		Sotero Laurel (1918–2009)	July 23, 1990	January 18, 1992	Nacionalista	Jovito Salonga	8th Congress
19		Ernesto Maceda (1935–2016)	January 18, 1992	January 18, 1993	NPC	Neptali Gonzales	8th Congress
19		Ernesto Maceda (1935–2016)	January 18, 1992	January 18, 1993	NPC	Neptali Gonzales	9th Congress
20		Teofisto Guingona Jr. (born 1928)	January 18, 1993	July 6, 1993	LDP	Edgardo Angara	9th Congress
Vacant (Note: Position vacant during the Senate’s adjournment sine die after Teofisto Guingona Jr.'s resignation as senator following his appointment as executive secretary by president Fidel V. Ramos.) (July 6, 1993 – July 26, 1993)						Edgardo Angara	9th Congress
21		Leticia Ramos-Shahani (1929–2017)	July 26, 1993	October 10, 1996	Lakas	Edgardo Angara	9th Congress
21		Leticia Ramos-Shahani (1929–2017)	July 26, 1993	October 10, 1996	Lakas	Edgardo Angara	10th Congress
21		Leticia Ramos-Shahani (1929–2017)	July 26, 1993	October 10, 1996	Lakas	Neptali Gonzales	10th Congress
22		Blas Ople (1927–2003)	October 10, 1996	July 26, 1999	LDP	Ernesto Maceda	10th Congress
22		Blas Ople (1927–2003)	October 10, 1996	July 26, 1999	LDP	Neptali Gonzales	10th Congress
22		Blas Ople (1927–2003)	October 10, 1996	July 26, 1999	LDP	Marcelo Fernan	11th Congress
22		Blas Ople (1927–2003)	October 10, 1996	July 26, 1999	LDP	Blas Ople (acting)	11th Congress
23		John Henry Osmeña (1935–2021)	July 26, 1999	April 12, 2000	LDP	Blas Ople	11th Congress
24		Blas Ople (1927–2003)	April 12, 2000	June 30, 2001	LDP	Franklin Drilon	11th Congress
24		Blas Ople (1927–2003)	April 12, 2000	June 30, 2001	LDP	Nene Pimentel	11th Congress
25		Manny Villar (born 1949)	July 23, 2001	August 12, 2002	Independent	Franklin Drilon	12th Congress
26		Juan Flavier (1935–2014)	August 12, 2002	June 30, 2007	Lakas	Franklin Drilon	12th Congress
26		Juan Flavier (1935–2014)	August 12, 2002	June 30, 2007	Lakas	Franklin Drilon	13th Congress
26		Juan Flavier (1935–2014)	August 12, 2002	June 30, 2007	Lakas	Manny Villar	13th Congress
27		Jinggoy Estrada (born 1963)	July 23, 2007	June 30, 2013	PMP	Manny Villar	14th Congress
27		Jinggoy Estrada (born 1963)	July 23, 2007	June 30, 2013	PMP	Juan Ponce Enrile	14th Congress
27		Jinggoy Estrada (born 1963)	July 23, 2007	June 30, 2013	PMP	Juan Ponce Enrile	15th Congress
27		Jinggoy Estrada (born 1963)	July 23, 2007	June 30, 2013	PMP	Jinggoy Estrada (acting)	15th Congress
28		Ralph Recto (born 1964)	July 22, 2013	June 30, 2016	Liberal	Franklin Drilon	16th Congress
29		Franklin Drilon (born 1945)	July 25, 2016	February 27, 2017	Liberal	Koko Pimentel	17th Congress
30		Ralph Recto (born 1964)	February 27, 2017	June 29, 2022	Liberal (until 2018)	Koko Pimentel	17th Congress
30		Ralph Recto (born 1964)	February 27, 2017	June 29, 2022	Liberal (until 2018)	Tito Sotto	17th Congress
30		Ralph Recto (born 1964)	February 27, 2017	June 29, 2022	Nacionalista (from 2018)	Tito Sotto	17th Congress
30		Ralph Recto (born 1964)	February 27, 2017	June 29, 2022	Nacionalista (from 2018)	Tito Sotto	18th Congress
31		Juan Miguel Zubiri (born 1969)	June 29, 2022	July 25, 2022	Independent	Tito Sotto	18th Congress
31		Juan Miguel Zubiri (born 1969)	June 29, 2022	July 25, 2022	Independent	None (Note: Zubiri was designated Senate president pro tempore during the Senate’s adjournment sine die, serving from the day before Tito Sotto’s term as senator ended on June 30 until his formal election as Senate president at the opening of the 19th Congress in July.)	18th Congress
31		Juan Miguel Zubiri (born 1969)	June 29, 2022	July 25, 2022	Independent	None	19th Congress
32		Loren Legarda (born 1960)	July 25, 2022	May 20, 2024	NPC	Juan Miguel Zubiri	19th Congress
33		Jinggoy Estrada (born 1963)	May 20, 2024	September 8, 2025	PMP	Francis Escudero	19th Congress
33		Jinggoy Estrada (born 1963)	May 20, 2024	September 8, 2025	PMP	Francis Escudero	20th Congress
34		Panfilo Lacson (born 1948)	September 8, 2025	May 11, 2026	Independent	Tito Sotto	20th Congress
35		Loren Legarda (born 1960)	May 11, 2026	June 3, 2026	NPC	Alan Peter Cayetano	20th Congress
36		Sherwin Gatchalian (born 1974)	June 3, 2026	June 17, 2026	NPC	Sherwin Gatchalian (acting) (Note: Gatchalian in his capacity as the president pro tempore concurrently served as the acting Senate president, after the position has been declared vacant on June 3, 2026.)	20th Congress
37		Tito Sotto (born 1948)	June 17, 2026	Incumbent	NPC	Sherwin Gatchalian	20th Congress

=== Unverified or uncertain tenures ===
Sources claim that Francisco Enage and Claro M. Recto served as president pro tempore of the Senate for two uncertain periods during the Senate presidency of Manuel L. Quezon. It is unclear whether Enage and Recto held the position in an official capacity or served in an acting capacity during Sergio Osmeña and José Avelino’s tenures, respectively, as Senate president pro tempore.

Portrait	Name (Birth–Death)	Term of office	Party/Coalition	Senate President	Legislature
	Francisco Enage; Senator for the 9th District (1878–1959)	c. 1922	Nacionalista	Manuel L. Quezon	5th Legislature
	Francisco Enage; Senator for the 9th District (1878–1959)	November 20, 1923 – c. 1925	Nacionalista Colectivista	Manuel L. Quezon	6th Legislature
	Claro M. Recto; Senator for the 5th District (1890–1960)	June 20, 1935 – July 3, 1935	Nacionalista Democratico	Manuel L. Quezon	10th Legislature

== Relationship with the Senate presidency ==
Seven presidents pro tempore were later elected Senate president, while four former Senate presidents subsequently served as president pro tempore.

Officeholder	Served first as	Later served as
José Avelino	President pro tempore (1935)	Senate president (1946–1949)
Quintín Paredes	President pro tempore (1950–1952)	Senate president (1952)
Camilo Osías	Senate president (1952; 1953)	President pro tempore (1967)
Ernesto Maceda	President pro tempore (1992–1993)	Senate president (1996–1998)
Blas Ople	President pro tempore (1996–1999)	Senate president (1999–2000)
Blas Ople	Senate president (1999–2000)	President pro tempore (2000–2001)
Franklin Drilon	Senate president (2000; 2001–2006; 2013–2016)	President pro tempore (2016–2017)
Manny Villar	President pro tempore (2001–2002)	Senate president (2006–2008)
Tito Sotto	Senate president (2018–2022; 2025–2026)	President pro tempore (2026–present)
Juan Miguel Zubiri	President pro tempore (acting; 2022)	Senate president (2022–2024)
Sherwin Gatchalian	President pro tempore (2026)	Senate president (2026–present)
