= Arnis in the Philippines =

- Country: Philippines
- Governing body: Philippine Eskrima Kali Arnis Federation
- National team(s): Philippine national team

International competitions
- WEKAF World Championships; Southeast Asian Games

Arnis is a Filipino martial art and is the legally recognized national sport in the Philippines.

== History ==
The precise origin of Arnis is unknown due to a lack of proper documentation.

It is speculated that it arose from native Filipinos in Luzon and the Visayas to circumvent a weapons ban imposed by the Spaniards during the Spanish colonial era. They utilize sticks and disguised the martial art as folk dance. Dionisio Cañete, supreme grandmaster, says that Filipino martial arts is already in the archipelago prior to the arrival of the Spanish in the 16th century who banned the practice due to it being unproductive activity but Cañete insist it is due to fear of the art being used against the colonizers. Arnis or Kali would be influenced by the Europeans as well, incorporating old Fencing terms in Spanish.

Alternatively it could date back in the pre-Spanish era, influenced by the neighboring Srivijaya and Majapahit empires based on linguistics analysis of the various other names of Arnis.

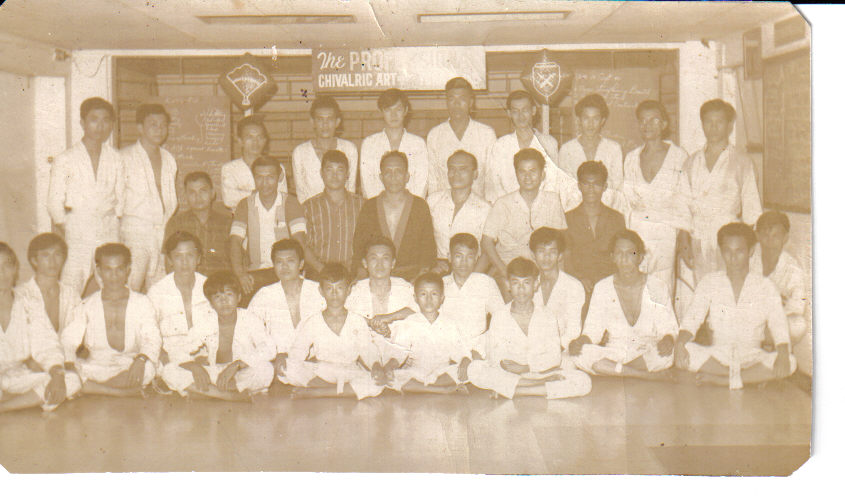
Doce Pares

The Eulogio and Cacoy Cañete would learn about the discipline from escrimadors in the early 1900s, the early part of the American colonial era in the Philippines. The Cañetes in 1918 moved to Cebu City to study under the Saavedra family, led by Lorenzo and Teodoro. The first Arnis club the Labangon Fencing Club would be formed. It was disbanded years after.

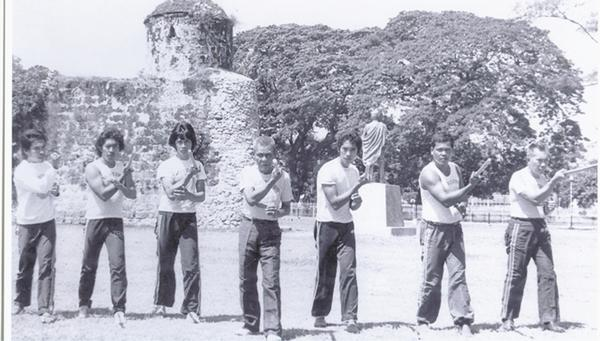
Balintawak Arnis

Eulogio Cañete with 12 founders would organize the Doce Pares in this place. Practitioners would be hired as bodyguards for politicians and some would engage in Juego Todos or street brawls. Some masters would get killed after the 1952 national elections. Arnis clubs would splinter off from Doce Pares; Balintawak Arnis of Anciong Bacon five months later and Lapunti Arnis in 1960.

An international sports body, the World Eskrima Kali Arnis Federation would be in the country in August 11, 1989, after a convention was held at the Sacred Heart Center in Cebu City. Dionisio Cañete was elected as their charter president. Cañete would formalize rules and regulations to professionalized the sport of Arnis.

== Official recognition ==
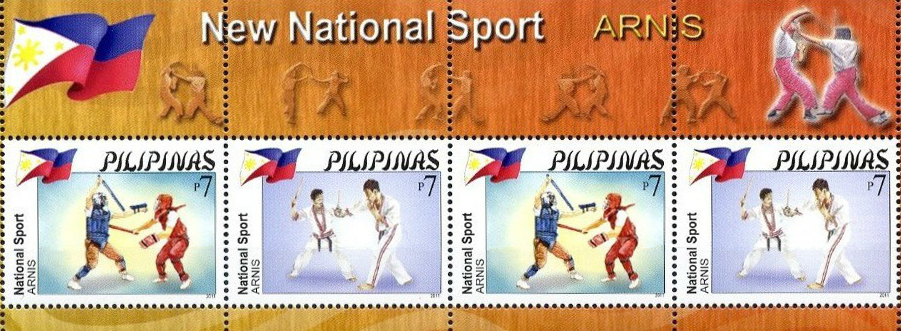
Arnis featured in Philippine postal stamps.

Arnis is recognized as a national sport in the Philippines via Republic Act 9850 signed by President Gloria Arroyo on December 11, 2009. The sport is mandated to be taught in physical education classes in schools in the Philippines. Well-funded schools tend to have more comprehensive arnis lessons.

== Tournaments ==
Arnis has been part of the calendar of the Palarong Pambansa, the national games for in-school youth in the country.

The WEKAF World Championship has been hosted in the Philippines. This includes the very first edition held in Cebu City in 1989. It will be held in Mandaue in 2016 and 2022.

The sport has also been included when the Philippines hosted the Southeast Asian Games in three occasions; 1991, 2005, and 2019. In 1991, arnis was held as a demonstration sport. In the two other occasions, it was a regular or medal event.

== National sports association ==
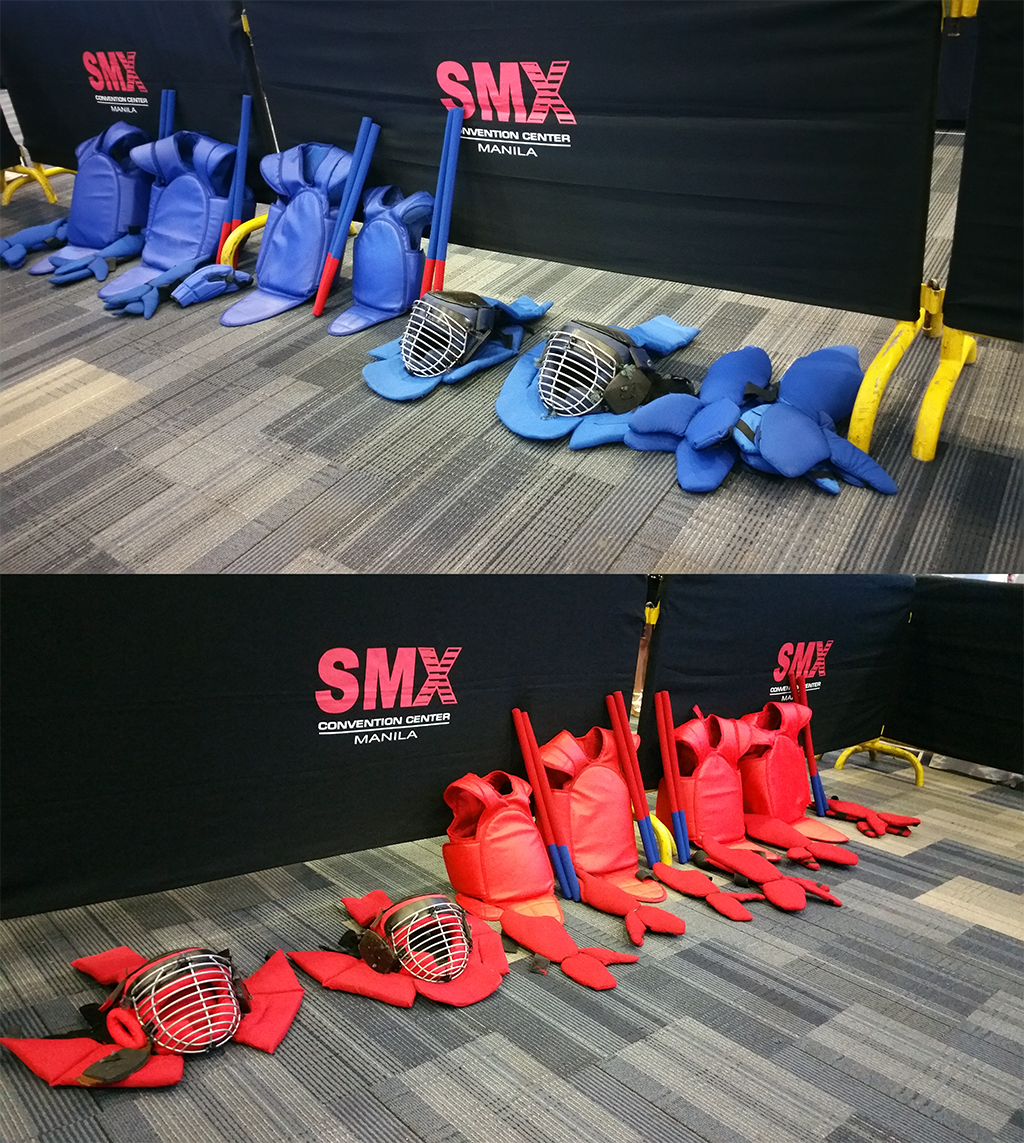
Arnis tournament equipment.

The Philippines' national sports association (NSA) for arnis currently recognized by the Philippine Olympic Committee (POC) is the Philippine Eskrima Kali Arnis Federation (PEKAF).

Previously Arnis Philippines (ARPI) was the country's NSA until its expulsion from the POC in 2018. ARPI protested against the revocation of their membership. PEKAF founded in 2017, would supplant ARPI as the Philippines' NSA for Arnis.
