= Riaz Amin =

British Bangladeshi martial artist (born 1998)

- Born: Tower Hamlets, London, England
- Native name: রিয়াজ আমিন
- Nationality: English
- Style: Shotokan Karate, Filipino Martial Arts, Stick-fighting
- Fighting out of: Tower Hamlets, London, England
- Team: England Karate Squad
- Trainer: Shamim Haque, Abjol Miah, Alton Brown, Joe Anderson, Raphael Veras
- Rank: 1st Dan Black Belt in Shotokan Karate
- Years active: Since 2005

Other information
- Occupation: Martial artist
- Notable clubs: Toyakwai Karate Association, FMA Academy/Kalis Illustrimo
- Website: riazamin.co.uk

Riaz Amin (Bengali: রিয়াজ আমিন; born 27 February 1998) is a British Bangladeshi martial artist who practices Shotokan Karate and Filipino Martial Arts. He is the current World Eskrima Kali Arnis Federation (WEKAF) World Championships champion.

== Early life ==
Amin was born in Tower Hamlets, London, England and is a third generation British Bangladeshi. He attended Coopers' Company and Coborn School.

== Martial arts career ==
At the age of five, Amin started martial arts in Shotokan Karate with Alton Brown (2nd Dan) and Joe Anderson (7th Dan) of Toyakwai Karate Association. He then started competing at local, national and international competitions. He won various gold medals such as The English Open and Southern Regional Championships. At the age of 11, he achieved his 1st Dan black belt. At the age of 13, he started learning Filipino Martial Arts (FMA) at the FMA Academy under Shamim Haque and Abjol Miah. Haque teaches Amin the deadly blade art 'Kalis Ilustrisimo'.

Since starting karate, Amin has competed in many major competitions. In 2008, he took Gold, Silver and Bronze in the Malta Four Nations International Open Championship organised by SKSM Karate Malta, and came 4th in the Funakoshi World Championships. In 2009, he won Gold in the European Karate Federation (EKF) International, Essex Grand National Open Championship and Capital Open Championship.

On 2 December 2012, at the age of 14, Amin entered his first full contact tournament at the British World Escrima-Kalis-Arnis Federation (WEKAF) Tournament and became the Single Stick Cadet fighter of the day British champion.

In July 2014, Amin became a Cadet's squad member for Great Britain and was given the opportunity to compete in the WEKAF World Championships in Budapest, Hungary. The fighting style encompasses many forms and is based around the Filipino martial-arts based system, and he was involved in hand-to-hand combat. He entered three events, the double, single and soft stick/first strike, and won medals in each category. He beat a Hungarian opponent in the final to become the world champion.

From 2005 to 2014, he has fought in more than 50 tournaments. He now trains in karate under Alton Brown, Raphael Veras and others from the England Karate Squad.

In September 2014, Amin was interviewed by Nadia Ali on BBC Asian Network.

== Honours ==
Year	Event	Venue	Result
	The English Open		Gold
	Southern Regional Championships		Gold
2008	Malta Four Nations International Championship	Dingli, Malta	Gold, Silver and Bronze
2008	Funakoshi World Championships	Birmingham, England	4th
2009	European Karate Federation International	Sheffield, England	Gold
2009	Essex Grand National Open Championship	Essex, England	Gold
2009	Capital Open Championship		Gold
2012	World Escrima-Kalis-Arnis Federation British Open Championships	Gillingham, Kent	Single Stick Cadet fighter of the day British champion
2014	World Escrima-Kalis-Arnis Federation World Championships	Budapest, Hungary	World champion

== See also ==
- British Bangladeshi
- List of British Bangladeshis
