= Terry Lim =

Malaysian-born Australian martial artist

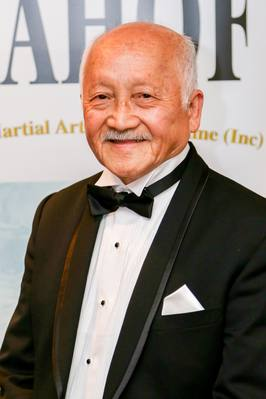
- Born: 2 December 1940 (age 85); Kedah, Malaysia
- Nationality: Australian
- Style: Karate; Kung Fu; Aikido; Hung Ga; Jujitsu; Kali(Arnis); Loong Fu Pai
- Teachers: Jacky Ong; Francis Ramasamy; Ang Ah Hock; Albert Lau; Malcolm Lomax
- Rank: Grandmaster
- Years active: 60

Other information
- Occupation: Martial artist Industrial Chemist (Retired)
- University: Swinburne University of Technology, Melbourne
- Website: Official Website

Loong Fu Pai
- Focus: Hybrid
- Country of origin: Australia
- Creator: Terry Lim
- Parenthood: Karate; Kung Fu; Aikido; Hung Ga; Jujitsu

Terry Lim is an Australasian Martial Arts Hall of Fame inductee, Martial Arts Australia Martial Artist of the year Masters Awards recipient and renowned martial artist who has had a short documentary made about him titled It's him... Terry Lim by Angus Sampson. He is Founder of the Loong Fu Pai Martial Arts Academy in 1981, with over 350 active students. Loong Fu Pai is one of the most successful martial arts schools in Melbourne founded by one person, grading over 60 black belts. He began running inter-club martial arts tournaments in 1985, and since then these tournaments have run 3 times each year. His Branches total 19 making it one of the largest independent Academies in the one state.

== Early life ==
Terry Lim was born on the 2nd of December 1940 in Kedah Malaysia. He first began training in combat judo (Jujitsu) in 1956, at his brother's police unit in Penang, Malaysia, under Jacky Ong. His training later continued into new styles, as he learned Aikido and Mushindo under Shihan Francis Ramasamy and was taught Hokkien Shaolin martial arts by Shaolin Master Ang Ah Hock.

In 1960, Lim graduated from Chung Ling High School, and two years later his parents sent him to Melbourne to complete his education. After arriving in Melbourne, Lim joined the Chinese Youth Society of Melbourne, where he was taught Hung Ga Kung Fu by Sifu Albert Lau.

Lim later studied San Chi Kai Karate under Grandmaster Malcolm Lomax who graded him to Shodan (First dan Black Belt).

In 1968 Lim graduated from Swinburne University of Technology, and began work at Ensign Laboratories as an industrial chemist, where he was later promoted to Chief Control Chemist. In 1992, Lim retired from Ensign.

== Martial Arts Achievements ==
=== 35 year Club Anniversary ===
In October 2016 Lim's Loong Fu Pai martial arts Academy celebrated its 35-year anniversary with a wide range of demonstrations and his Tai Man Jo ceremony to honor the highest ranking disciples. Among the VIP guests were Zang Tong of Australia's 100 year old Tai Chi Kung Fu institution, Blitz Hall of Fame's, George Kolovos who is one of the biggest names in K1 Kickboxing promotions for over 30 years in the country and Street Wing Chun Kung Fu. Lim's academy currently has over 350 active members and 69 black belts, over the last 35 years more than 10,000 students have attended his clubs. Since 1999, Lim has been taking his students to Penang, Malaysia, every two years for training and grading purposes. With 18 branches of the Loong Fu Pai Academy it is one of the most successful to be created by a single individual.

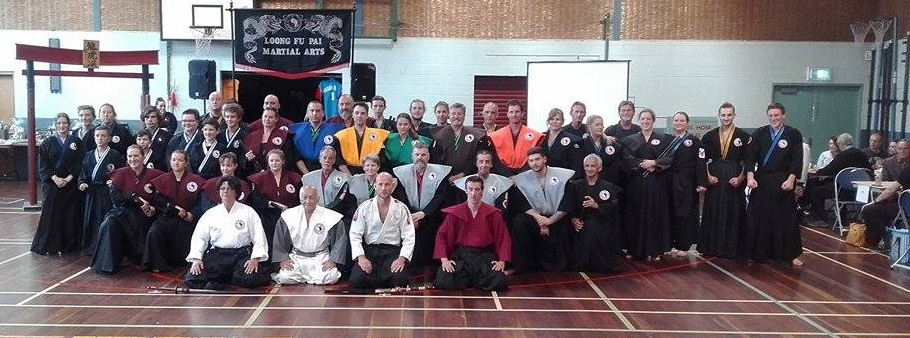
Loong Fu Pai 35th club anniversary

=== Kali Sticks ===
Lim holds a 4th Dan in International Philippine Martial Arts Federation (Kombatan), Kali sticks being a specialty and very popular weapon. In 2015 Lim held a Kali stick (Arnis) fighting seminar at CrossFit Riseup owned by Ben Poon.

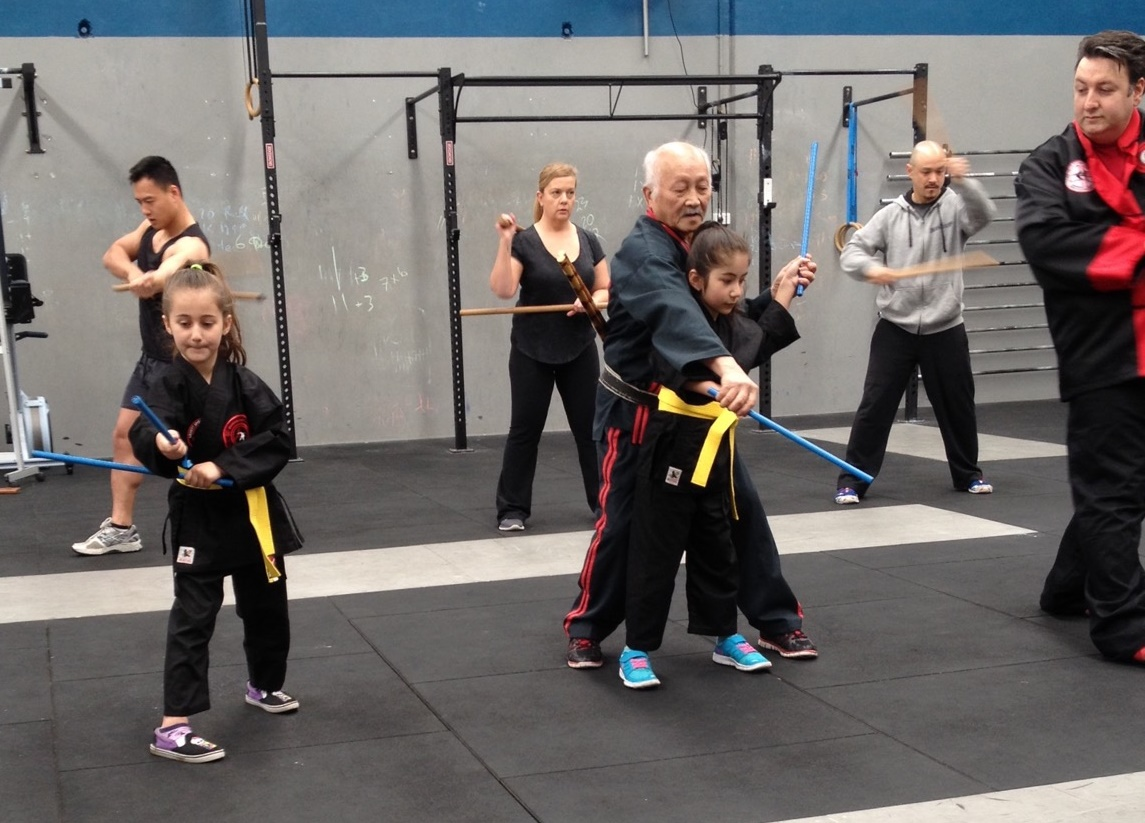
Kali Sticks sticks seminar

=== Tournament Circuit ===
Lim has been running his inter-club tournaments three times per year for over 30 years and has been inviting outside martial arts clubs to participate. The last Loong Fu Pai tournament was held at the Gloria Pyke Netball Complex in Dandenong this is one of Melbourne's largest sports halls.

=== Hall of Fame ===
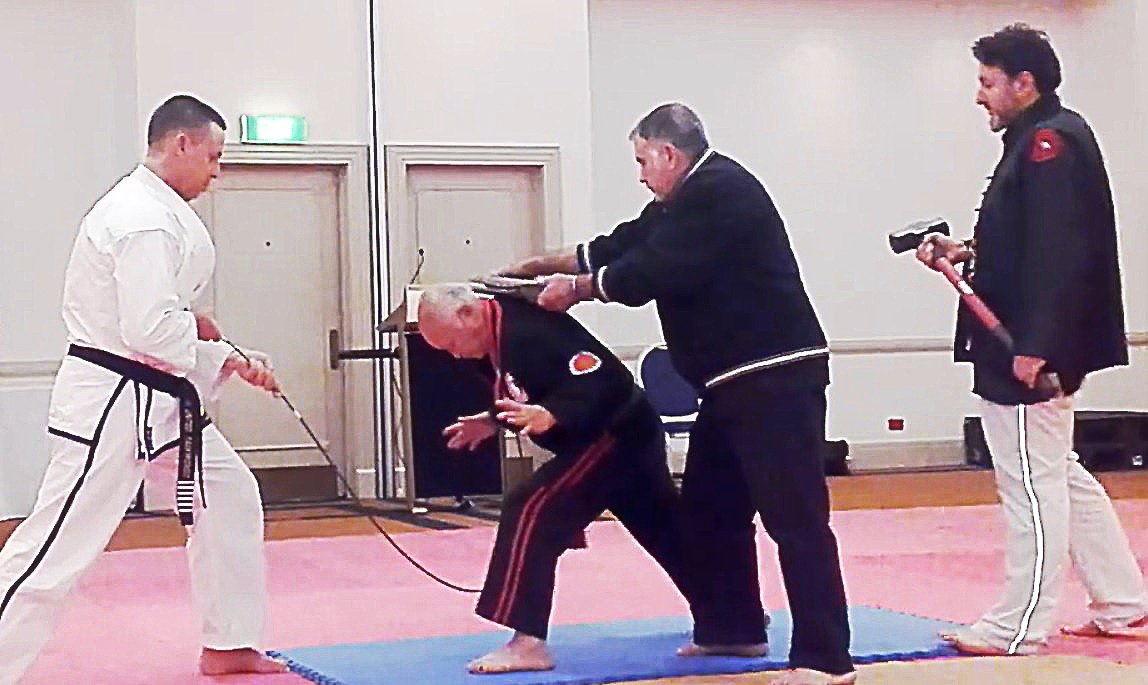

For Lim's 70th birthday and Hall of Fame demonstration, he prepared and bent a two-meter metal rod with his throat as shown in his documentary by the acclaimed award-winning director Angus Sampson. In 2016 Lim was presented with a lifetime achievement award at the Australasian Martial Arts Hall of Fame and World Karate Union Hall Of Fame, which was held at the Hotel Grand Chancellor on Hindley Street, Adelaide.

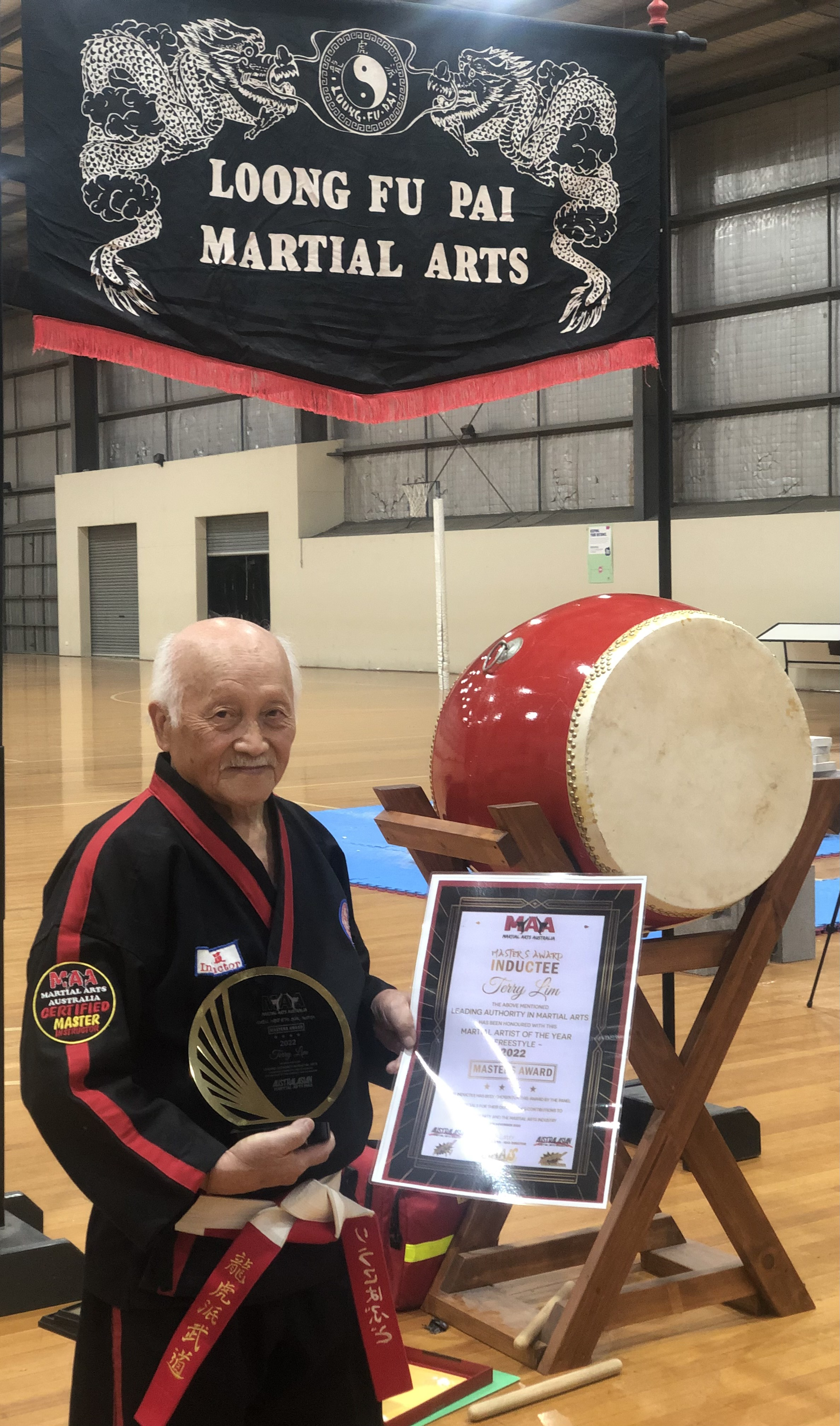
Masters Awards Martial Artist of the year - Freestyle

== Filmography ==
In 2011, Angus Sampson produced a documentary about Lim called It's him... Terry Lim!; the documentary was shown at the Melbourne International Film Festival. Lim is also an actor, known for;

- Trojan Warrior (2002) as Hng Sng.
- Macbeth (2006 film) as the Chinese Businessman.
- It's Him... Terry Lim! (2011) as himself.
- Metal Warrior (2011) as The Secret Weapon.
- Better Man (miniseries) (2013) as father Giang.
