= Philippine Eskrima Kali Arnis Federation =

Philippine Eskrima Kali Arnis Federation PEKAF
- IOC nation: Philippines
- Sport: Arnis
- Official website: pnat-pekaf.org

History
- Preceding organisations: Arnis Philippines

Affiliations
- International federation: World Eskrima Kali Arnis Federation (WEKAF)
- National Olympic Committee: Philippine Olympic Committee

Governing Body
- President: Migz Zubiri
- Address: Cebu City
- Country: Philippines

The Philippine Eskrima Kali Arnis Federation (PEKAF) is the governing body for the sport of arnis in the Philippines. It is a member of the Philippine Olympic Committee (POC) and the World Eskrima Kali Arnis Federation (WEKAF).

== History ==
PEKAF founded in 2017 with Senator Miguel Zubiri installed as its inaugural chairman and president.

Arnis Philippines (ARPI) was the previous recognized NSA for Arnis in the Philippines. ARPI would be expelled from the POC in 2018.

PEKAF held its first tournament in Cebu in July 2017. It has also been responsible for determining the Philippine delegation for the WEKAF World Championships since the 2018 edition.

== Tournaments ==
PEKAF have also lobbied the permanent inclusion of arnis in the Southeast Asian Games. They were able to return the sport in the 2019 Southeast Asian Games when the Philippines hosted the multi-sport tournament. Arnis was last included in the regional games in 2005, when PEKAF's inception was yet to occur. PEKAF was also able to convince Cambodia to include Arnis in the 2023 Southeast Asian Games, marking the sport's debut in an edition of the games not held in the Philippines.

== National team records ==
=== WEKAF World Championships ===
Year	Gold medal	Silver medal	Bronze medal	Total	Rank
(Hawaii) 2018 Lahaina	39	24	32	95	2
(Philippines) 2022 Mandaue	141	139	138	418	1

=== Southeast Asian Games ===
Year	Gold medal	Silver medal	Bronze medal	Total	Rank
2019 Philippines	14	4	2	20	1
2023 Cambodia	6	2	4	12	1
