= Australasian Martial Arts Hall of Fame =

- President: Steven Weston
- Vice President: Peter Hunt
- Website: https://www.amahof.asn.au

The Australasian Martial Arts Hall of Fame is an organization established in 1996 that recognizes martial art practitioners in the Australasian region. The organization operates as an incorporated non-profit and conducts annual induction ceremonies.

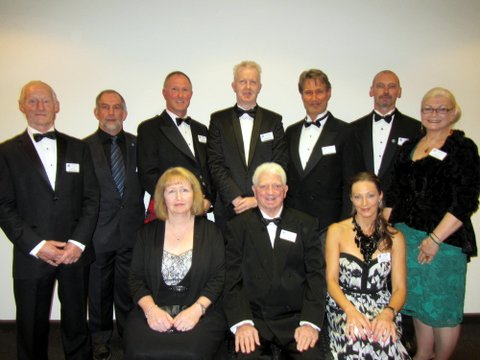
2014 Australasian Martial Arts Hall of Fame Inductees including notable Richard Norton (actor).

== 2024 inductees ==
Name	Award	System	State
Louie Dimou	Continual Excellence and Service to the Australasian Martial Arts Community	Taekwondo	SA
Shireen Dindar	Continual Excellence and Service to the Australasian Martial Arts Community	Taichi & Capoeira	WA
Scott Harvey	Continual Excellence and Service to the Australasian Martial Arts Community	Taekwondo & Hapkido	NSW
Graham McDonnell	Continual Excellence and Service to the Australasian Martial Arts Community	Zen Do Kai Karate, Muay Thai, & Krava Maga	WA
Rick Rando	Continual Excellence and Service to the Australasian Martial Arts Community	Taekwondo	USA
Peter Tasiopoulos	Continual Excellence and Service to the Australasian Martial Arts Community	Kenpo	VIC

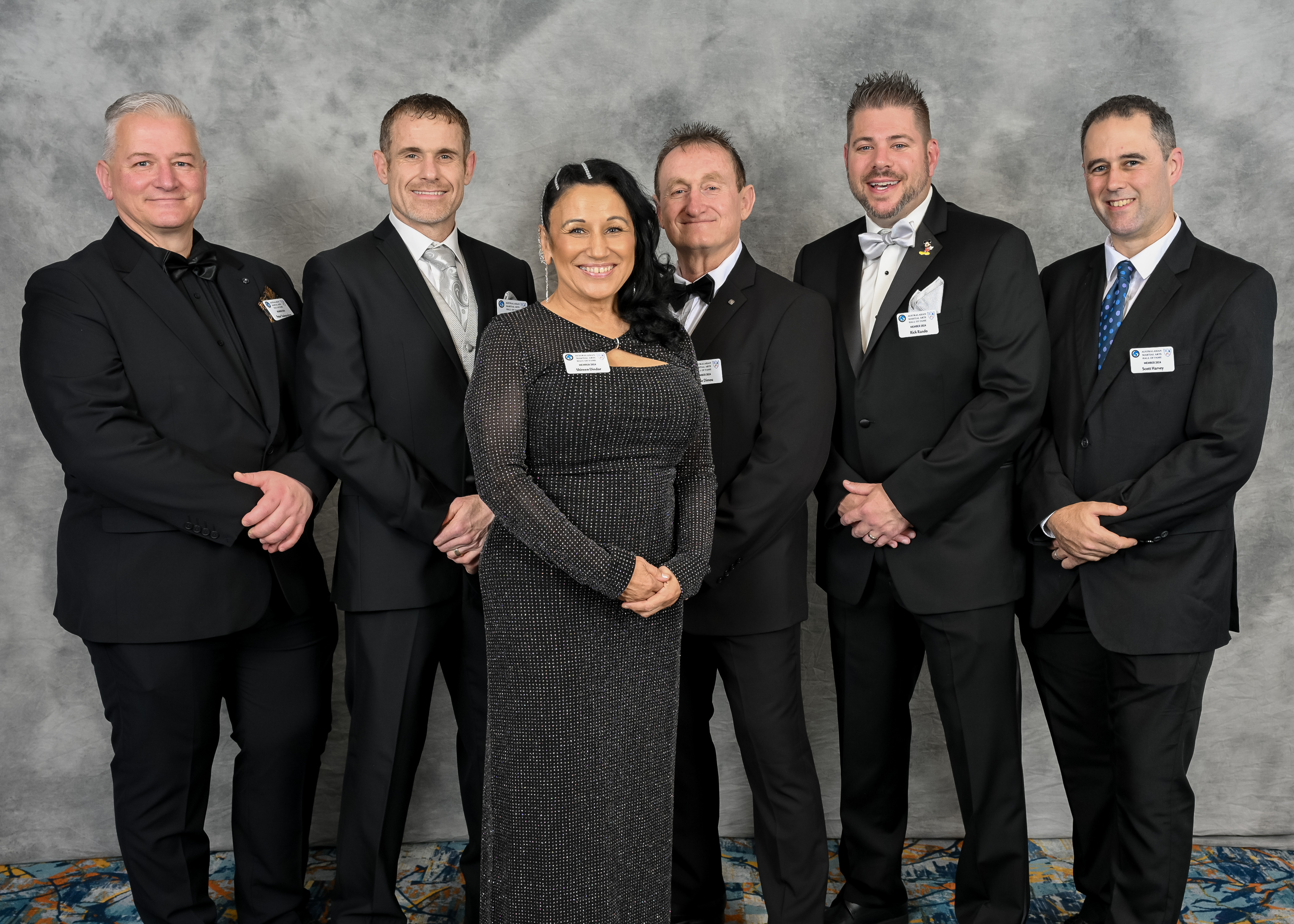
2024 AMAHOF Inductees: (L to R) Peter Tasiopolous, Graham McDonnell, Shireen Dindar, Louie Dimou, Rick Rando, and Scott Harvey.

== 2023 inductees ==
Name	Award	System	State
Chris Bailey	Continual Excellence and Service to the Australasian Martial Arts Community	Jiu-Jitsu, Judo, & Chinese Boxing	VIC
Mick Brinkley	Continual Excellence and Service to the Australasian Martial Arts Community	Taekwondo	NSW
Sharon Canning	Continual Excellence and Service to the Australasian Martial Arts Community	Taekwondo	ACT
Lindsay Guy	Continual Excellence and Service to the Australasian Martial Arts Community	Karate	NSW
Gerard Kelly	Continual Excellence and Service to the Australasian Martial Arts Community	Taekwondo	NSW
James Sheedy	Continual Excellence and Service to the Australasian Martial Arts Community	Taekwondo	NSW
Gawain Siu	Continual Excellence and Service to the Australasian Martial Arts Community	Ging Mo Kune	WA
Leong Cheok Son	Continual Excellence and Service to the Australasian Martial Arts Community	Kung Fu, Wing Chun, and Muay Thai	SA
David Thew	Continual Excellence and Service to the Australasian Martial Arts Community	Tai Chi Chuan, Qigong, & Ba Gua Zhang	NZ
Mike Waite	Continual Excellence and Service to the Australasian Martial Arts Community	Karate, Muay Thai, & Kali Self Defence	WA
Nick Wyborn	Continual Excellence and Service to the Australasian Martial Arts Community	Kapap	NSW

== 2022 inductees ==
Name	Award	System	State
Sean Allen	Continual Excellence and Service to the Australasian Martial Arts Community	Zen Do Kai Karate	WA
Tom Bellamy	Continual Excellence and Service to the Australasian Martial Arts Community	Go Rin No Pou Ju-Jitsu	QLD
Alan Pond	Continual Excellence and Service to the Australasian Martial Arts Community	Muay Thai	WA
Wayne Spear	Continual Excellence and Service to the Australasian Martial Arts Community	Zen Do Kai Karate	WA
Victor Stuart	Continual Excellence and Service to the Australasian Martial Arts Community	Jujutsu & Karate	WA
Peter Wong	Continual Excellence and Service to the Australasian Martial Arts Community	Taekwon-do	WA

== 2021 inductees ==
Name	Award	System	State
Matt Geister	Continual Excellence and Service to the Australasian Martial Arts Community	Hapkido	NSW
Diana Latorre	Continual Excellence and Service to the Australasian Martial Arts Community	Taekwondo	NSW
Lincoln Harris	Continual Excellence and Service to the Australasian Martial Arts Community	Karate	NSW
Benjamin Pollet	Continual Excellence and Service to the Australasian Martial Arts Community	Karate and Jiu Jitsu	NSW
Wayne Swanton	Continual Excellence and Service to the Australasian Martial Arts Community	Judo	VIC
Lionel Daley	Continual Excellence and Service to the Australasian Martial Arts Community	Jujitsu	TAS

== 2020 inductees ==
Name	Award	System	State
Andrew Coatsworth	Martial Artist of the Year	Judo	VIC
Colin Wee	Martial Artist of the Year	Traditional Taekwondo	WA
Dean Woodhams	Lifetime Achievement	Zen Do Kai & Tetsu-Ryu	WA
Peter Hunt	Martial Artist of the Year	Tetsu-Ryu & Iaido	WA
Simon Vanyai	Support to the Development of Martial Arts	Taiko	WA
Tom Johnson	Lifetime Achievement	Iaido & Jodo	QLD
Vince Cordeiro	Lifetime Achievement	Choy Lay Fut	WA

== 2019 inductees ==
Name	Award	System	State
Darren Lea	Lifetime Achievement	Okinawan Shorin Ryu	NSW
Gary Johnson	Lifetime Achievement	Munen Muso Martial Arts	NSW
John Ellis	Instructor of the Year	Budoshinkai Karate Jitsu	NSW
Tim Ellis	Budoka of the Year	Budoshinkai Karate	NSW
Michael Quin	Lifetime Achievement	Zen Do Kai	VIC
Neil Livingstone	Instructor of the Year	Taekwon-do	NZ
Nigel Stupples	Martial Artist of the Year	Zen Do Kai	NZ
Steven Tran	Lifetime achievement	Martial Arts	NSW
Anthony Pritchard	Budoka of the Year	Judo	NSW

== 2018 inductees ==
Name	Award	System	State
Andrew Kantzavelos	Instructor of the Year	Kenpo	SA
Neville Sharp	Lifetime achievement	Judo	VIC
Joseph Julian	Lifetime achievement	Karate	VIC
David Gordon	Martial Artist of the year	Toyama Ryu Iaido	VIC
Xu Weiguo	Lifetime achievement	Wing Chun Tai Ji	PRC
Patricia Harrington	Lifetime achievement	Judo Ju Jitsu	NSW
George Kolovos	Lifetime achievement	Kyokushin Karate	VIC
Matt Charnley	Martial Artist of the Year	Mixed Martial Arts	VIC

== 2017 inductees ==
Name	Award	System	State
Abraham Sie	Budoka of the Year	Zen Do Kai	NSW
Alex Terris	Lifetime achievement	Kyokushin Karate	NZ
Brett Canning	Instructor of the Year	United Taekwondo	ACT
Chris Futcher-Coles	Lifetime Achievement	Kung Fu	NSW
George Lee	Lifetime Achievement	Tai Chi – Chi Gong	SA
Grant Bannister	Lifetime Achievement	San Chi Kai Karate	VIC
John Marrable	Lifetime Achievement	Goju Ryu Karate	NZ
John Tomic	Martial Artist of the Year	United Taekwondo	NSW
Michael Creedy	Lifetime Achievement	Martial Arts	QLD
Peter Jennings	Lifetime Achievement	Kyokushin Karate	NZ
Peter Kelly	Martial Artist of the Year	Aikido	TAS

== 2016 inductees ==
Name	Award	System	State
Alan Rowe	Budoka of the Year	Aikido	Tasmania
Bill Johnson	Martial Artist of the Year	Close Combat Systems	New South Wales
Brenda Hum	Support to the Martial Arts	Health & Healing	South Australia
Doug Spear	Martial Artist of the Year	Karate/Kenjutsu	Western Australia
Kevin Prime	Budoka of the Year	Judo	Victoria
Malcolm Slade	Lifetime Achievement	Judo	Victoria
Robert Naumoski	Budoka of the Year	Brazilian Jiu Jitsu	New South Wales
Sam Gervasi	Lifetime Achievement	Martial Arts & Healing	Victoria
Terry Lim	Lifetime Achievement	Martial Arts	Victoria

== 2015 inductees ==
Name	Award	System	State
Anthony Ball	Lifetime Achievement	Martial Arts	Victoria
Bronilyn Smith	Lifetime Achievement	Aikido	Tasmania
Geoffrey Harrison	Budoka of the Year	San Chi Kai	Tasmania
Kathy Gangemi	Junior Development & Support of the Martial Arts	Martial Arts	Tasmania
Lynn Farmer	Budoka of the Year	Ju Jitsu	New South Wales
Roland Winter	Budoka of the Year	Zen Do Kai	New South Wales
Tim Waters	Lifetime Achievement	Aikido	Tasmania

== 2014 inductees ==
Name	System	State
Daniel Simmons	Judo	New South Wales
Danny McIntyre	Aikido	New Zealand
Denise Walker	Shotokan Karate	New Zealand
Graham Slater	Karate	Victoria
Julie Streeter	Karate	Queensland
Michael Keane	Judo	Victoria
Michelle Hext	Taekwondo	Victoria
Peter James	Kendo	Western Australia
Richard Norton (actor)	Karate	Victoria
Scott Teys	Karate	Australian Capital Territory

== See also ==
- List of halls and walks of fame
