= Arnis =

Filipino martial art

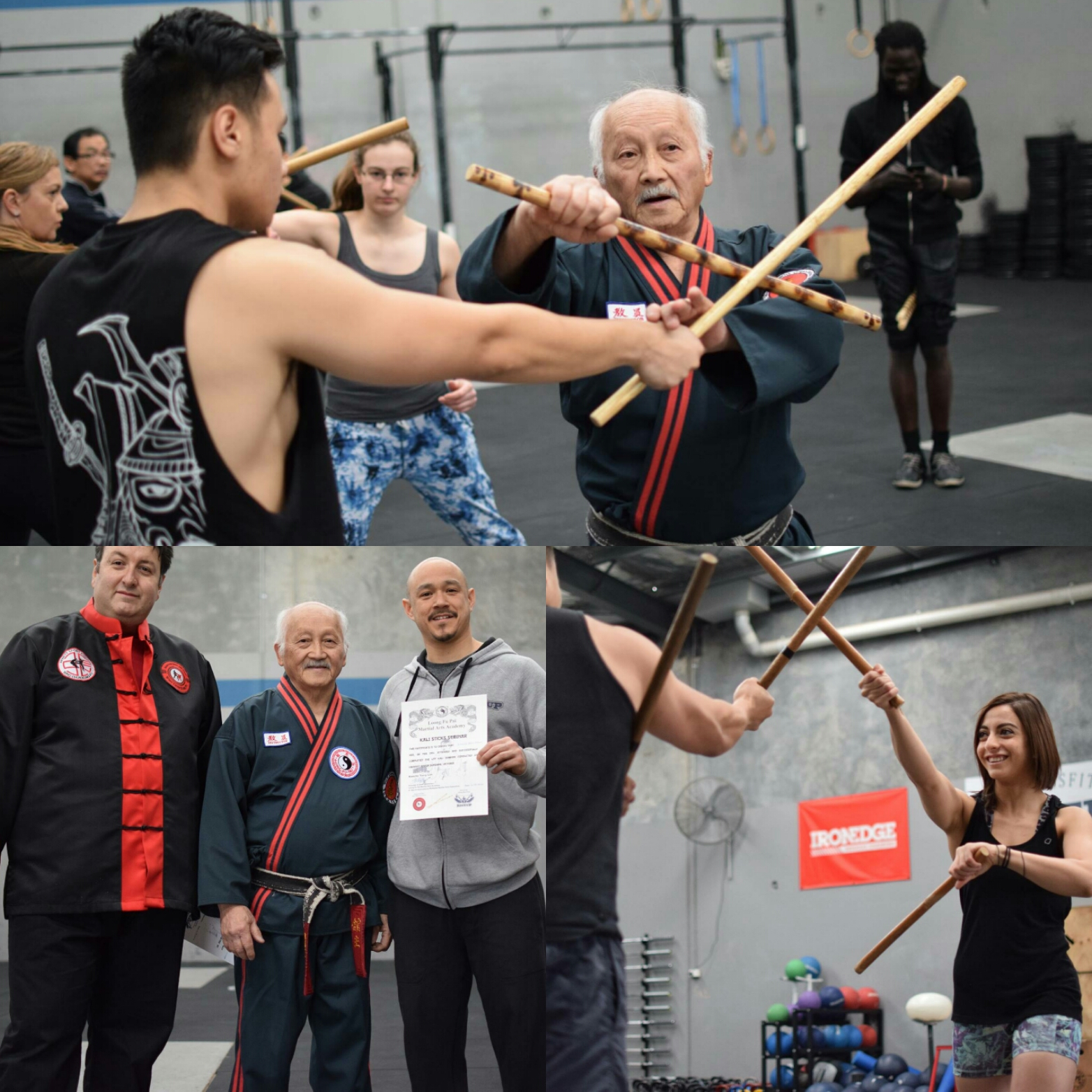
- Also known as: Eskrima; Kali
- Focus: Stick fighting; Knife fighting; Sword fighting; Unarmed combat
- Hardness: Handheld weapons, full contact
- Country of origin: Philippines
- Famous practitioners: Paul Ingram; Riaz Amin; Ron Balicki; Steve Blackman; Cacoy Cañete; Dionisio Cañete; Carlos Deleon; Danny Guba; Jeff Imada; Dan Inosanto; Bruce Lee; Terry Lim; Mark Mikita; Doug Marcaida; John Hutchinson; Rene Latosa; Erik Paulson; Florentino Pecate, Sr; Remy Presas; Ernesto Presas, Sr; Ernesto Presas, Jr; Brian Simpson; Migz Zubiri
- Parenthood: Fencing, Silat
- Olympic sport: No

Arnis, also known as eskrima/escrima or kali, is the national martial art of the Philippines. These three terms are, sometimes, interchangeable in referring to traditional martial arts of the Philippines ("Filipino Martial Arts", or FMA), which emphasize weapon-based fighting with sticks, knives, bladed weapons, and various improvised weapons, as well as "open hand" techniques without weapons.

There were campaigns for arnis along with other Philippine martial arts to be nominated in the UNESCO Intangible Cultural Heritage Lists; and as of 2018, UNESCO has inscribed nine martial-arts-related intangible heritages.

== Name ==
Arnis comes from arnés, the Old Spanish for "armour" (harness is an archaic English term from same root). It is said to derive from the armour costumes used in traditional Moro-moro stage plays, where actors fought mock battles with wooden swords. Arnes is also an archaic Spanish term for weapon, used as early as 1712. (Arms is an English term from the same root)

Eskrima (also spelled escrima) is derived from the Spanish word for fencing, esgrima. Their cognate in French is escrime and is related to the English term 'skirmish'.

The name kali was not historically used and is a 20th century coinage. It is most likely derived from the pre-Hispanic Filipino term for blades and fencing, kalis (Spanish spelling: "calis", cognate to kris or keris), documented by Ferdinand Magellan's expedition chronicler Antonio Pigafetta during their journey through the Visayas and in old Spanish to Filipino Mother Tongue dictionaries and vocabulary books dating from 1612 to the late 1800s, such as in Vocabulario de Lengua Tagala by Fr. Pedro de San Buenaventura. In this sense, kalis or calis (e.g. pagcacalis, "the art of kalis") ultimately fell out of use and was replaced by escrima and arnis. The term calis in various forms was present in these old Spanish documents in Ilocano, Ibanag (calli-t; pronounced as kal-lî), Kapampangan, Tagalog, Bicolano (caris), Waray (caris), Hiligaynon, Cebuano (calix, baladao – "kalis balaraw/dagger" and cales), and Moro-Maguindanao in Mindanao (calis – the kris, weapon). In some of these dictionaries, the term calis refers to a sword or knife kris or keris, while in others it refers to both swords and knives and their usage as well as a form of esgrima stick fighting. While kalis remains an academic term equivalent to kris or keris in some Philippine languages, in common usage kris is most often used to refer to the weapon while kalis instead most often sees use in Catholic contexts as an unrelated homonym, the translation of chalice. The first to use the term kali in reference to Filipino martial arts was Buenaventura Mirafuente in 1948, claiming it was the original native term before it was replaced by arnis or escrima. While Mirafuente posits that the original term was kali and that the letter "S" was added later, the late Grandmaster Remy Presas suggests that the "S" was dropped in modern times due to hypercorrection (assuming the "S" was a Spanish addition, when it wasn't) and became at present more known as kali in FMA circles outside the Philippines itself.

There exist numerous similar terms of reference for martial arts such as kalirongan, kaliradman, and pagkalikali. These may be the origin of the term kali or they may have evolved from it.

In their book Cebuano Eskrima: Beyond the Myth however, Dr. Ned Nepangue and Celestino Macachor contend that the term kali in reference to Filipino martial arts did not exist until Buenaventura Mirafuente wrote in the preface of the first known published book on arnis, Mga Karunungan sa Larong Arnis by Placido Yambao, the term kali as the native mother fighting art of the Philippine islands.

Practitioners of the arts are called arnisador (male, plural arnisadores) and arnisadora (female, plural arnisadoras) for those who call theirs arnis, eskrimador (male, plural eskrimadores) or eskrimadora (female, plural eskrimadoras) for those who call their art eskrima, and kalista or mangangali for those who practise kali.

It is also known as estoque (Spanish for rapier), estocada (Spanish for thrust or stab) and garrote (Spanish for club). In Luzon it may go by the name of arnis de mano or arnes de mano.

The indigenous martial art that the Spanish encountered in 1610 was not yet called "eskrima" at that time. During those times, this martial art was known as paccalicali-t (pronounced as pakkali-kalî) to the Ibanags, did ya (later changed to kabaroan) to the Ilokanos, sitbatan or kalirongan to Pangasinenses, sinawali ("to weave") to the Kapampangans, calis or pananandata ("use of weapons") to the Tagalogs, pagaradman to the Ilonggos and kaliradman to the Cebuanos. Kuntaw and Silat are separate martial arts that are also practiced in the Philippine archipelago.

== Historical accounts ==
The people of this country are not simple or foolish, nor are they frightened by anything whatever. They can be dealt with only by the arquebuse, or by gifts of gold or silver ... They kill the Spaniards so boldly, that without arquebuses we could do nothing. This was the reason that Magallanes, the discoverer of these islands, was killed; and that Villalobos and Sayavedra, and those who came afterward from Nueva España were maltreated. All those who have been killed since the coming of Miguel Lopez de Legazpi received their death through lack of arquebuses. The Indians have thousands of lances, daggers, shields, and other pieces of armor, with which they fight very well. They have no leaders to whom they look up. The havoc caused by the arquebuse, and their own lack of honor, make them seek refuge in flight, and give obedience to our orders.

— Francisco de Sande, "Relation and Description of the Phelipenas Islands" (1577)

== Origins ==
=== Legend ===
According to legend, It was introduced by Bodhidharma, a Buddhist Monk born in India (5th or 6th century CE), who came to Southeast Asia via the Srivijayan capital of Palembang and then reached the island of Luzon. Upon his travel, he saw dried Ratan canes on the ground and introduced this rare, martial art to the locals.

=== History ===
As arnis was an art usually practiced by the poor or commoner class (as opposed to nobility or warrior classes), most practitioners lacked the scholarly education to create any kind of written record. While the same can be said of many martial arts, this is especially true for arnis because almost all of its history is anecdotal, oral or promotional. Another origin of arnis can be traced back to native "Pintados" or then "Tintadus" fighting techniques during conflicts among the various pre-hispanic Filipino settlements, though the current form has Spanish influence from old fencing which originated in Spain in the 15th century. It has other influences as well, as settlers and traders travelling through the Malay Archipelago brought the influence of silat as well as Chinese and Indian martial arts. Some of the population still practise localized Chinese fighting methods known as kuntaw.

It has also been theorized that the Filipino art of arnis may have roots in India and came to the Philippines via people who traveled through Indonesia and Malaysia to the Philippine islands. Silambam, a stick/staff-based ancient martial art of India influenced many martial arts in Asia like silat. As such, arnis may share ancestry with these systems– some arnis moves are similar to the short stick (kali or kaji) and other weapon based fighting styles of Silambam.

When the Spaniards first arrived in the Philippines, they already observed weapons-based martial arts practiced by the natives, which may or may not be related to present-day Arnis. The earliest written records of Filipino culture and life, including martial arts, come from the first Spanish explorers. Some early expeditions fought native tribesmen armed with sticks and knives. In 1521, Ferdinand Magellan was killed in Cebu at the Battle of Mactan by the forces of Datu Lapulapu, the chief of Mactan. Some Arnisadors hold that Lapulapu's men killed Magellan in a sword-fight, though historical evidence proves otherwise. The only eyewitness account of the battle by chronicler, Antonio Pigafetta, tells that Magellan was stabbed in the face and the arm with spears and overwhelmed by multiple warriors who hacked and stabbed at him:

The natives continued to pursue us, and picking up the same spear four or six times, hurled it at us again and again. Recognizing the captain, so many turned upon him that they knocked his helmet off his head twice, but he always stood firmly like a good knight, together with some others. Thus did we fight for more than one hour, refusing to retire farther. An Indian hurled a bamboo spear into the captain's face, but the latter immediately killed him with his lance, which he left in the Indian's body. Then, trying to lay hand on sword, he could draw it out but halfway, because he had been wounded in the arm with a bamboo spear. When the natives saw that, they all hurled themselves upon him. One of them wounded him on the left leg with a large cutlass, which resembles a scimitar, only being larger. That caused the captain to fall face downward, when immediately they rushed upon him with iron and bamboo spears and with their cutlasses, until they killed our mirror, our light, our comfort, and our true guide. When they wounded him, he turned back many times to see whether we were all in the boats. Thereupon, beholding him dead, we, wounded, retreated, as best we could, to the boats, which were already pulling off.

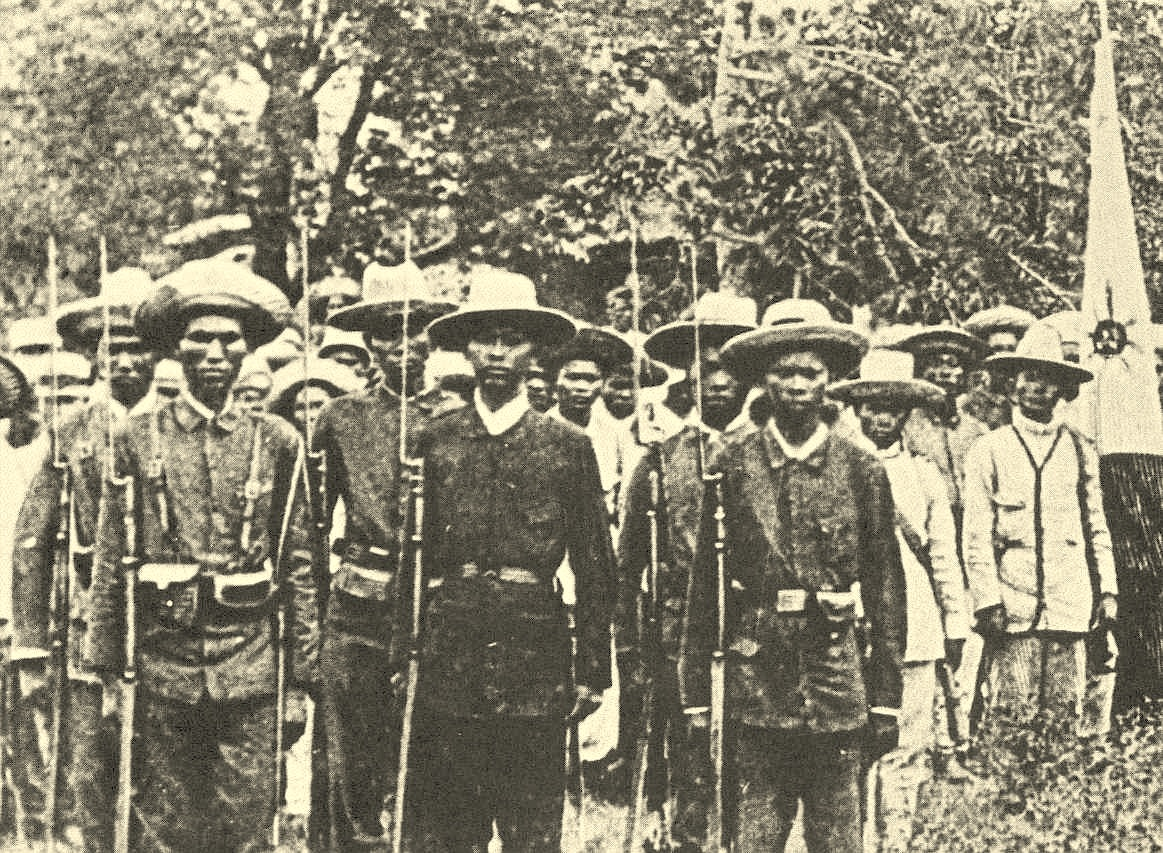
Katipunan

Due to the conflict-ridden nature of the Philippine archipelago, where settlements (Kedatuans, Rajahnates and Sultanates) were often at war with one another or raiding each other, warriors were forged in the many wars in the islands, thus during the precolonial era, the geographical area acquired a reputation for its capable mercenaries, which were soon employed all across South, Southeast and East Asia. Lucoes (warriors from Luzon) aided the Burmese king in his invasion of Siam in 1547 AD. At the same time, Lusung warriors fought alongside the Siamese king and faced the same elephant army of the Burmese king in the defense of the Siamese capital at Ayuthaya The former sultan of Malacca decided to retake his city from the Portuguese with a fleet of ships from Lusung in 1525 AD. Lucoes influence even manifested in East Asia at Japan where Lucoes sailors initially guided Portuguese ships to the Shogunate and even South Asia in Sri Lanka where Lungshanoid pottery from Luzon were found in burials there. The first contact the Portuguese have of people of Luzon was in the Malabar Coast off Western India at South Asia, wherein; at the Letter from Gaspar Pereira to King Manuel I of Portugal, January 11, 1506, in Cochin. Published in Cartas de Affonso de Albuquerque seguidas de documentos que as elucidam, Vol. 2 (Lisbon: Academia das Sciências de Lisboa, 1898), 354−369 (364-366). Original manuscript in Arquivo Nacional/Torre do Tombo, Corpo Cronológico, Parte I, Maço 5, Doc. 70, fols. 8−8v, a "Luzam" (A person from Luzon) was serving in the Portuguese navy fighting against the Muslims of the Indian coast.

...aboard these two caravels there were many men who serve Your Highness, which I thought was good; those that serve here on the caravel of Nuno Vaz Pereira were António Lopes Teixeira, and luzam, 3 and Luís Mendes da Ilha […]and the [ship’s] clerk, Pero Vaz da Duquesa, and Francisco de Miranda, António de Matos, Cristóvão Raposo; and on Lopo Chanoca’s caravel, Francisco da Silva, [who] died, and Antão de Figueiredo, Álvaro de Brito, Valentim Rebelo, Rui Lopes de Carvalho, Bastião de Souto Mayor. They say it seemed that more than eighty of the Indians died. Things would have been very different if the wind had not died down, and the fire had not broken out on the gundeck killing most of [our men].

Pinto noted that there were a number of them in the Islamic fleets that went to battle with the Portuguese in the Philippines during the 16th century. The Sultan of Aceh as well as Suleiman, the Ottoman Commander who was brother of the Viceroy of Cairo, gave one of them (Sapetu Diraja) the task of ruling and holding Aru (northeast Sumatra) in 1540. Pinto also says one was named leader of the Malays remaining in the Moluccas Islands after the Portuguese conquest in 1511. Pigafetta notes that one of them was in command of the Brunei fleet in 1521. One famous Lucoes is Regimo de Raja, who was appointed by the Portuguese at Malacca as Temenggung (Jawi: تمڠݢوڠ) or Supreme Governor and Chief General. The Luzones were so commercially and militarily influential that the Portuguese soldier Joao de Barros considered them, "the most warlike and valiant of these parts."

Opinions differ on the degree to which Spanish rule in the Philippines affected Arnis. The fact that a large number of techniques and the names of the arts themselves (arnis/arnes, eskrima/esgrima, garrote, estoque, etc.) have Spanish names suggest an influence. Some argue though that Spanish names in the martial art simply reflect the fact that Spanish was the lingua franca of the Philippines until the early 20th century, and that actual Spanish martial influence was limited.

What is certain is that the Spaniards brought with them and used their bladed weapon arts (including the system of Destreza developed by Carranza) when they started colonizing the archipelago in the 16th century. What is also known is that the Spaniards recruited soldiers from Mexico and Peru and sent them to fortify the Philippines and they had also trained mercenaries and warriors from local people like the Pangasinenses, Kapampangans, Tagalogs, Ilonggos, Cebuanos and Warays to pacify regions and put down revolts, thereby positing the possible cross-training between Arnis de Mano and the Venezuelan Martial Art of Juego del garrote. Of the Kapampangans, Fray Casimiro Díaz relates in 1718:

Los primeros que se decidieron á experimentar fortuna fueron los pampangos, nación la más belicosa y noble de estas Islas, y cercana á Manila. Y era lo peor hallarse ejercitada en el arte militar en nuestras escuelas en los presidios de Ternate, Zamboanga, Joló, Caraga y otras partes, donde se conoció bien su valor; pero este necesita del abrigo del nuestro, y así decían que un español y tres pampangos, valían por cuatro españoles.

The first who decided to experiment with their fortune (revolt) were the Pampangos, the most warlike and prominent people of these islands, and close to Manila. And it was all the worse because these people had been trained in the military art in our own schools in the presidios (fortified outposts) of Ternate, Zamboanga, Jolo, Caraga and other places where their valor was well known; but this needs the help of ours, and so they say that a Spaniard plus three Pampangos equal four Spaniards.

It is likely then that these native warriors and foreign soldiers would have passed on to very close friends and family members these newly learned skills to augment already existing and effective local ones. They would have also shared tactics and techniques with each other when placed in the same military group and fighting on the same side in foreign regions such as Formosa, Mindanao, the Moluccas and the Marianas.

One of the more prominent features of Arnis that point to possible Spanish influence is the Espada y Daga (Spanish for "sword and dagger") method, a term also used in Spanish fencing. Filipino espada y daga differs somewhat from European rapier and dagger techniques; the stances are different as weapons used in Arnis are typically shorter than European swords. According to Grandmaster Federico Lazo† (1938–2010), unlike in European historical fencing, there is no lunging in the Northern Ilocano Kabaroan style of Arnis – it is more of an evasive art. On the other hand, it is present in some Visayan styles documented by FMA researchers Celestino Macachor and Ned Nepangue such as Yasay Sable Estocada from Bago. Having done comparative studies, Kalis Ilustrisimo archivist Romeo Macapagal also estimates that 40% of the blade-oriented style of Antonio "Tatang" Ilustrisimo† (1904–1997) descends from European styles, brought by the Spanish. Some authors state that these Filipino Martial Arts were also cross-trained with martial arts brought over by Spanish soldiers and Jesuit priests.

After the Spanish colonized the Philippines, a decree was set that prohibited civilians from carrying full-sized swords (such as the Kris and the Kampilan). Despite this, the practitioners found ways to maintain and keep the arts alive, using sticks made out of rattan rather than swords, as well as small knives wielded like swords. Some of the arts were passed down from one generation to the other. Sometimes the art took the form choreographed dances such as the Sakuting stick dance or during mock battles at Moro-moro (Moros y Cristianos) stage plays. Also as a result, a unique and complex stick-based technique evolved in the Visayas and Luzon regions. The southern Mindanao retains almost exclusively blade-oriented techniques, as the Spaniards and Americans never fully conquered the southern parts of this island.

Although Arnis combines native fighting techniques with old Spanish fencing and other influences, a degree of systematization was achieved over time, resulting in a distinguishable Philippine martial art. With time, a system for the teaching of the basics also evolved. However, with the exception of a few older and more established systems, it was previously common to pass the art from generation to generation in an informal approach. This has made attempts to trace the lineage of a practitioner difficult. For example, aside from learning from their family members like his uncle Regino Ilustrisimo, Antonio Ilustrisimo seemed to have learned to fight while sailing around the Philippines, while his cousin and student Floro Villabrille claimed to have been also taught by a blind Moro princess in the mountains; a claim later refuted by the older Ilustrisimo. Both have since died.

== Modern history ==
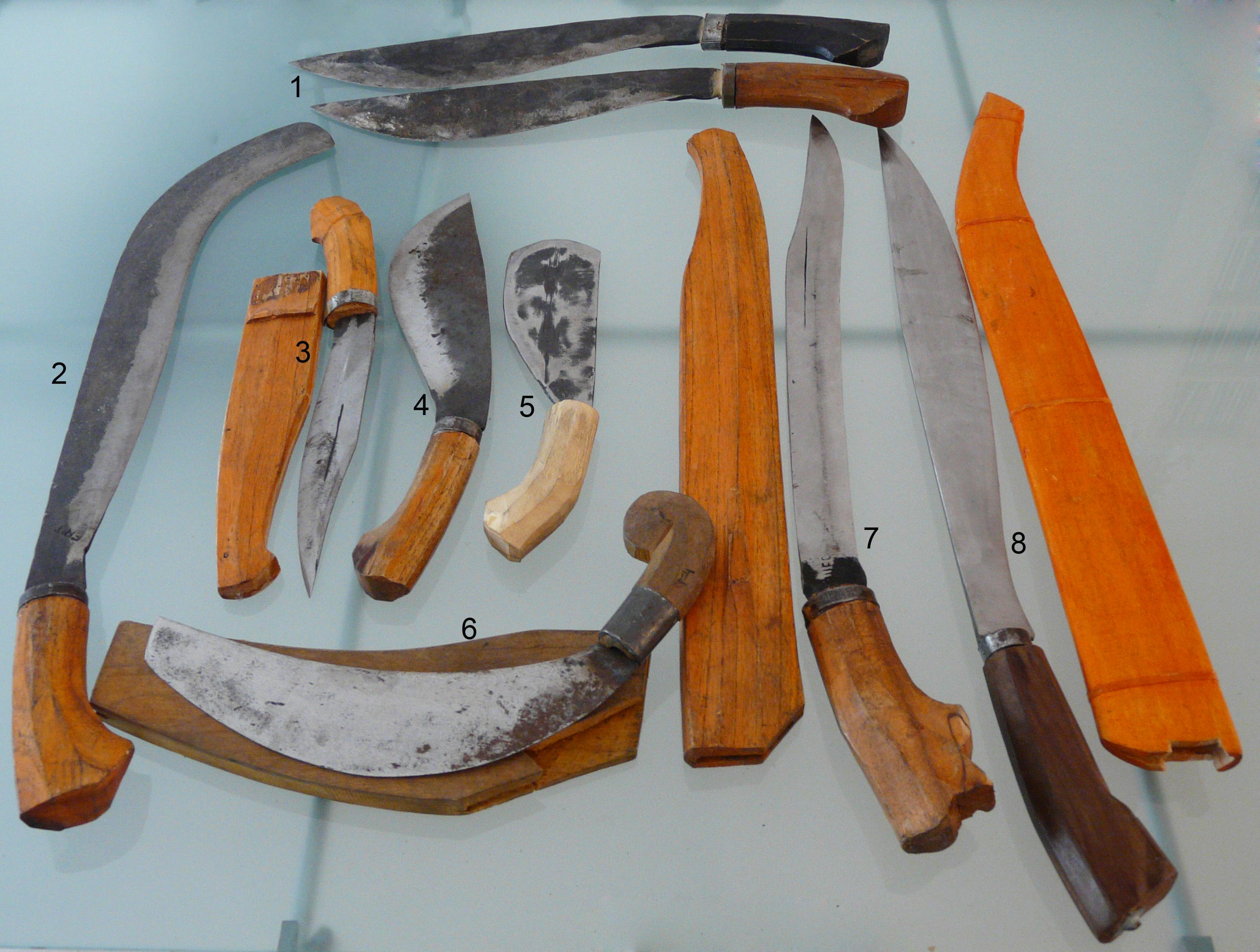
Various Filipino knives

The Philippines has what is known as a blade culture. Unlike in the West where Medieval and Renaissance combative and self-defense blade arts have gone almost extinct (having devolved into sport fencing with the advent of firearms), blade fighting in the Philippines is a living art. Local folk in the Philippines are much more likely to carry knives than guns. They are commonly carried as tools by farmers, used by street vendors to prepare coconuts, pineapples, watermelons, other fruits and meats, and balisongs are cheap to procure in the streets as well as being easily concealed. In fact, in some areas in the countryside, carrying a farming knife like the itak or bolo was a sign that one was making a living because of the nature of work in those areas. In the country of Palau, the local term for Filipino is chad ra oles, which literally means "people of the knife" because of Filipinos' reputation for carrying knives and using them in fights.

=== Asia-Pacific and the Americas ===
Soldiers and mercenaries trained in the Philippines which were recruited by France which was then in an alliance with Spain, had fought in Cambodia and Vietnam justified by defending newly converted Catholic populations from persecutions and had assisted France in establishing French Cochinchina centered in Saigon. Also in Asia, at China, during the Taiping Rebellion, Filipinos who were described as Manilamen and were 'Reputed to be brave and fierce fighters' and 'were plentiful in Shanghai and always eager for action' were employed by the Foreign forces as mercenaries to successfully quell the Taiping Rebellion. In the opposite side of the world at the Americas, descendants of Filipinos were active in the Anti-Imperialist Wars in the Americas. Filipinos living in Louisiana at the independent settlement of Saint Malo were recruited to be soldiers commanded by Jean Lafitte in the defense of New Orleans during the War of 1812 against a Britain attempting to reconquer a rebel America. "Manilamen" recruited from San Blas together with the Argentinian of French descent, Hypolite Bouchard, joined other nationalities living nearby such as Frenchmen, Mexicans and Americans in the assault of Spanish California during the Argentinian War of Independence. Mexicans of Filipino descent being led by Filipino-Mexican General Isidoro Montes de Oca assisted Vicente Guerrero in the Mexican war of independence against Spain. Isidoro Montes de Oca was a celebrated war hero famous for the battle action of the Treasury of Tamo, in Michoacán on September 15, 1818, in which the opposing forces numbered four times greater, yet they were totally destroyed.

=== Philippine Revolution ===
Contrary to the view of some modern historians that it was only guns that won the Philippine revolutionaries against the Spaniards, blades also played a large part.

During the 1898 Battle of Manila, a report from The Cincinnati Enquirer went:

... The Philippine native, like all the kindred Malay races, cannot do any fighting as a rule except at close quarters, slashing with his heavy knife. The weapon is called machete, or bolo, or kampilan, or parang, or kris. The plan of action is the same – to rush in unexpectedly and hack about swiftly, without the slightest attempt at self-preservation.

The Mauser rifle, too, in hard work is found to be a mistake. It has a case of five cartridges, which have to be all used before any others can be inserted. That is, to say, if a soldier has occasion to fire three cartridges he must go on and waste the other two, or else leave himself to meet a possible sudden rush with only two rounds in his rifle. Perhaps it may be the fault of the men, or their misfortune in being undrilled, but they are often knifed while in the act of reloading their rifles. Whatever be the explanation there is something wrong in troops with rifles and bayonets being driven steadily back by natives armed with knives. The insurgents have some guns, but most of the wounded Spanish soldiers seen in the streets have knife wounds.

=== Philippine–American War ===
Americans were first exposed to Arnis during the Philippine–American War in events such as the Balangiga massacre where most of an American company was hacked to death or seriously injured by bolo-wielding guerillas in Balangiga, Eastern Samar – and in battles in Mindanao, where an American serviceman was decapitated by a Moro warrior even after he emptied his .38 Long Colt caliber revolver into his opponent. That and similar events led to the request and the development of the Colt M1911 pistol and the .45 ACP cartridge by Col. John T. Thompson, Louis La Garde and John Browning which had more stopping power.

=== World War II ===
During World War II, many Filipinos fought the Japanese hand to hand with their blades as guerilla fighters or as military units under the USAFFE like the Bolo Battalion (now known as the Tabak Division).

Some of the grandmasters who are known to have used their skills in World War II are Antonio Ilustrisimo, Benjamin Luna-Lema, Leo Giron, Teodoro "Doring" Saavedra, brothers Eulogio and Cacoy Cañete, Timoteo "Timor" Maranga, Sr, Jesus Bayas and Balbino Tortal Bonganciso.

=== Spread ===
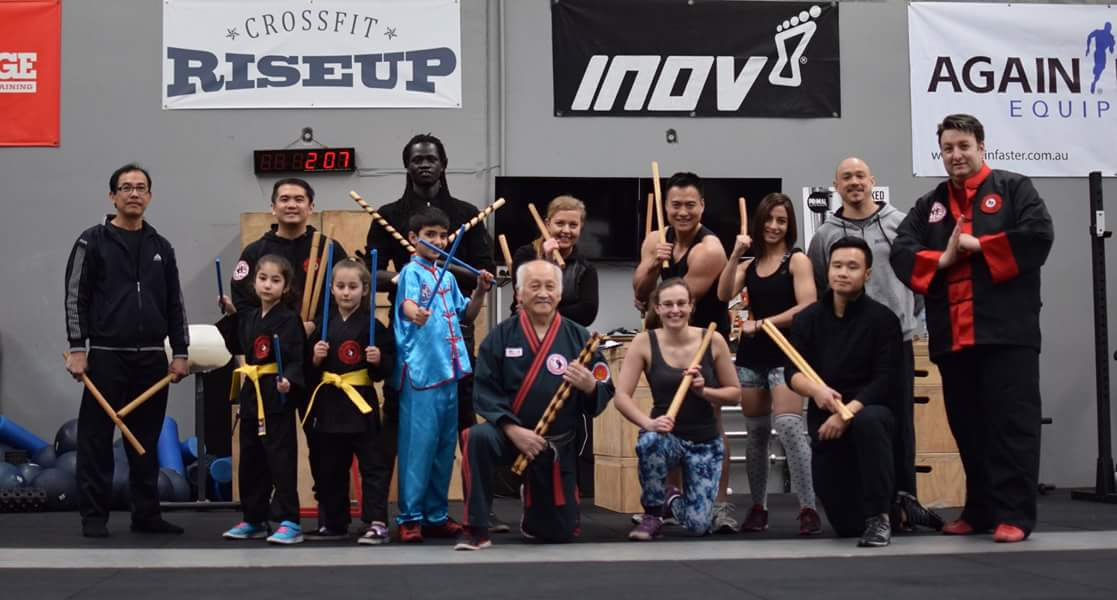
Kali stick seminar group at Ben Poon's Riseup Crossfit center, by Terry Lim, in Melbourne, Australia

The arts had no traditional belting or grading systems as they were taught informally. It was said that to proclaim a student a "master" was considered ridiculous and a virtual death warrant as the individual would become challenged left and right to potentially lethal duels by other Arnisadores looking to make names for themselves. Belt ranking was a recent addition adopted from Japanese arts such as karate and judo, which had become more popular with Filipinos. They were added to give structure to the systems, and to be able to compete for the attention of students.

With regards to its spread outside the Philippines, Arnis was brought to Hawaii and California as far back as the 1920s by Filipino migrant workers. Its teaching was kept strictly within Filipino communities until the late 1960s when masters such as Angel Cabales began teaching it to others. Even then, instructors teaching Arnis in the 1960s and 70s were often reprimanded by their elders for publicly teaching a part of their culture that had been preserved through secrecy. The spread of Arnis was helped in Australia through brothers Jeff and Chris Traish, Richard Marlin and Terry Lim (founder of Loong Fu Pai martial arts academy) who also holds a 4th Dan in International Philippine Martial Arts Federation.

In recent years, there has been increased interest in Arnis for its usefulness when defending against knives in street encounters. As a result, many systems of Arnis have been modified in varying degrees to make them more marketable to a worldwide audience. Usually this involves increased emphasis on locking, controls, and disarms, focusing mainly on aspects of self-defense. However, most styles follow the philosophy that the best defense is a good offense. Modern training methods tend to de-emphasize careful footwork and low stances, stressing the learning of techniques in favor of more direct (and often lethal) tactics designed to instantly end an encounter.

In the Philippines, the spread is more significant due to the efforts of Richardson "Richard" Gialogo and Aniano "Jon" Lota, Jr. through the Department of Education (DepEd) Task Force on School Sports (TFSS). Arnis was first introduced in 1969 to some public and private school teachers when Remy Presas taught his personal style of Arnis which he called "Modern Arnis". He taught his own style to the students of the National College of Physical Education (NCPE) when he was given the chance to teach there. The style "Modern Arnis" is not synonymous with the concept of modern or contemporary Arnis, where it has become a full blown sport embraced by the Department of Education, although there are some similarities. There was no formal program for Arnis from the 1970s to 1980s. Although some schools taught Arnis, these were not official nor prescribed.

The earliest historical record was the DECS Memorandum No. 294 Series of 1995 which entailed the Arnis Development Program Phase I. This was a joint effort of the Department of Education, Culture and Sports or DECS and the Office of then Senator Orlando "Orly" Mercado who awarded a budget from his pork barrel for the implementation of a national Arnis program. The Office of Senator Mercado was given the authority to designate the Arnis instructors for the said program.

The next stage was the Arnis Development Program Phase II. It was just a continuation of Phase I through DECS Memorandum No. 302 series of 1997. The same group conducted the seminars; known as the Arnis Association International (AAI). The Arnis instructors designated by Senator Mercado were informally called the "Mercado boys". They were Mr. Jeremias V. Dela Cruz, Rodel Dagooc and others who were direct students of Mr. Remy Presas of the Modern Arnis style. In this memorandum, there were two seminars conducted: October 6–11, 1997 in Baguio City and November 10–15, 1997 in General Santos City. The Arnis Module Development however did not push through. It was also during this time when the first Arnis instructional video was developed by the Bureau of Physical Education and School Sports (BPESS) entitled "Dynamic Arnis". This video featured the Gialogo Brothers: Richardson and Ryan Gialogo, direct students of Jeremias V. Dela Cruz.

However, the national Arnis program of Senator Orly Mercado and DECS died a natural death. It was only after nine years that Arnis found its way back into the Department of Education (formerly known as Department of Education, Culture and Sports or DECS). On February 5, 2004, the Task Force on School Sports (TFSS) of the Department of Education (DepEd), the new agency after the defunct BPESS, met with the National Sports Association (NSA) for Arnis in a Senate hearing. The Head of the TFSS was National Coordinator Mr. Feliciano N. Toledo II, considered the "Father of Arnis" in the Department of Education. He met with the top NSA officials at that time; however, nothing happened.

It was only in 2006 when the Task Force on School Sports had a new program for Arnis. The "National Training of Trainors in Arnis and Dance Sports", sponsored by the Task Force on School Sports, Department of Education (DepEd), was held at Teacher's Camp, Baguio City on March 13–17, 2006 and was conducted by two figures in the Arnis community: Aniano Lota, Jr. and Richardson Gialogo, then secretary-general and vice-president respectively of the National Sports Association for Arnis. And this was the start of the modern, contemporary and prevailing Arnis in the Department of Education.

In just two months, Arnis became part of the Palarong Pambansa (National Games) as a demonstration sport. The 2006 Palarong Pambansa was held in Naga City, Bicol Region with nine out of the seventeen regions of the Philippines participating. National, regional and provincial Arnis Seminars were conducted by the tandem of Mr. Aniano Lota, Jr. and Mr. Richardson Gialogo from 2006 to 2007 in coordination with the TFSS National Coordinator, Mr. Feliciano "Len" Toledo, and with the financial and logistical backing of the Department of Education. In 2007, Arnis was already a regular event in the Palarong Pambansa with all seventeen regions participating. Five weight divisions in the Full-contact Event and four categories in the Anyo (Forms) Event were played and became part of the official medal tally of the participants. This was held in Coronadal in Mindanao.

Arnis Seminars were continued in national, regional and provincial levels. These were all conducted by the tandem of Mr. Aniano Lota, Jr. and Mr. Richardson Gialogo, now both Arnis Consultants and official Lecturers of the Task Force on School Sports of the Department of Education. In 2008, Arnis was played in the Palarong Pambansa and again, with all seventeen regions participating. All nine events were played. This was held in Puerto Princesa City, Palawan.

Aside from Sports Officiating and Accreditation seminars, coaching and skill training seminars continued in national, regional and provincial levels. Requests from cities and even districts were also welcomed. The "evangelization" of Arnis was continued and both Gialogo and Lota were careful not to teach their personal styles. Both taught in "generic" form and focused on the rules of sports as promulgated by the Department of Education.

In 2009, Secondary Girls (High School Girls) were finally included in Palarong Pambansa and again, all seventeen regions participated. From the original five member teams, the number doubled with the inclusion of the girls. The medal tally also doubled from nine to eighteen. The 2009 Palarong Pambansa was held in Tacloban, Leyte in the Visayas.

In 2009, the "Writeshop of the Revision of the Physical Fitness Test and the Development of Learning Competencies in Arnis and Archery" was held in Teacher's Camp, Baguio City in October 5–8, 2009. Phase I of the National Curriculum for Arnis was finished and the curriculum writers were Mr. Richardson Gialogo and Mr. Aniano Lota, Jr.

The 2010 Palarong Pambansa was held in Tarlac, In Luzon. Again, both secondary boys and girls competed in the eighteen categories. It was here that the Department of Education Arnis Association Philippines or DEAAP had its first national elections.

In the 2011 Palarong Pambansa, elementary students joined.

=== Duels ===
One of the most important practices in classical Arnis was dueling, without any form of protection. The matches were preceded by cock-fighting and could be held in any open space, sometimes in a specially constructed enclosure. Arnisadores believe this tradition pre-dates the colonial period, pointing to similar practices of kickboxing matches in mainland Indochina as evidence. Spanish records tell of such dueling areas where cock-fights took place. The founders of most of the popular Arnis systems were famous duelists and legends circulate about how many opponents they killed. In rural areas throughout the Philippines today, modern Arnis matches are still held in dueling arenas. In bigger cities, recreations of duels are sometimes held at parks by local Arnis training-halls. These demonstrations are not choreographed beforehand but neither are they full-contact competitions.

In modern times, public dueling with blades has been deemed illegal in the Philippines due to high potential of severe injury or death. Dueling with live sticks and minimal protection still occurs during barrio fiestas in some towns such as in Paete in Laguna.

== Organization ==
There are two main types of Arnis practised as a sport. The most common system used internationally is that of the WEKAF (World Eskrima Kali Arnis Federation), established 1989. The earlier Arnis Philippines (ARPI) system, established in 1986, was most prominently used during the 2005 Southeast Asian Games.

== Weapons ==
Arnis students start their instruction by learning to fight with weapons, and only advance to empty-hand training once the stick and knife techniques have been sufficiently mastered. This is in contrast to most other well-known Asian martial arts but it is justified by the principle that bare-handed moves are acquired naturally through the same exercises as the weapon techniques, making muscle memory an important aspect of the teaching. It is also based on the obvious fact that an armed person who is trained has the advantage over a trained unarmed person, and serves to condition students to fight against armed assailants. Most systems of Arnis apply a single set of techniques for the stick, knife, and empty hands, a concept sometimes referred to as motion grouping. Since the weapon is seen as simply an extension of the body, the same angles and footwork are used either with or without a weapon. The reason for this is probably historical, because tribal warriors went into battle armed and only resorted to bare-handed fighting after losing their weapons. Many systems begin training with two weapons, either a pair of sticks or a stick and a wooden knife. These styles emphasise keeping both hands full and never moving them in the same direction, and trains practitioners to become ambidextrous. For example, one stick may strike the head while the other hits the arm. Such training develops the ability to use both limbs independently, a valuable skill, even when working with a single weapon.

A core concept and distinct feature of Filipino martial arts is the Live Hand. Even when as a practitioner wields only one weapon, the extra hand is used to control, trap or disarm an opponent's weapon and to aid in blocking, joint locking and manipulation of the opponent or other simultaneous motions such as bicep destruction with the live hand.

=== Baston ===
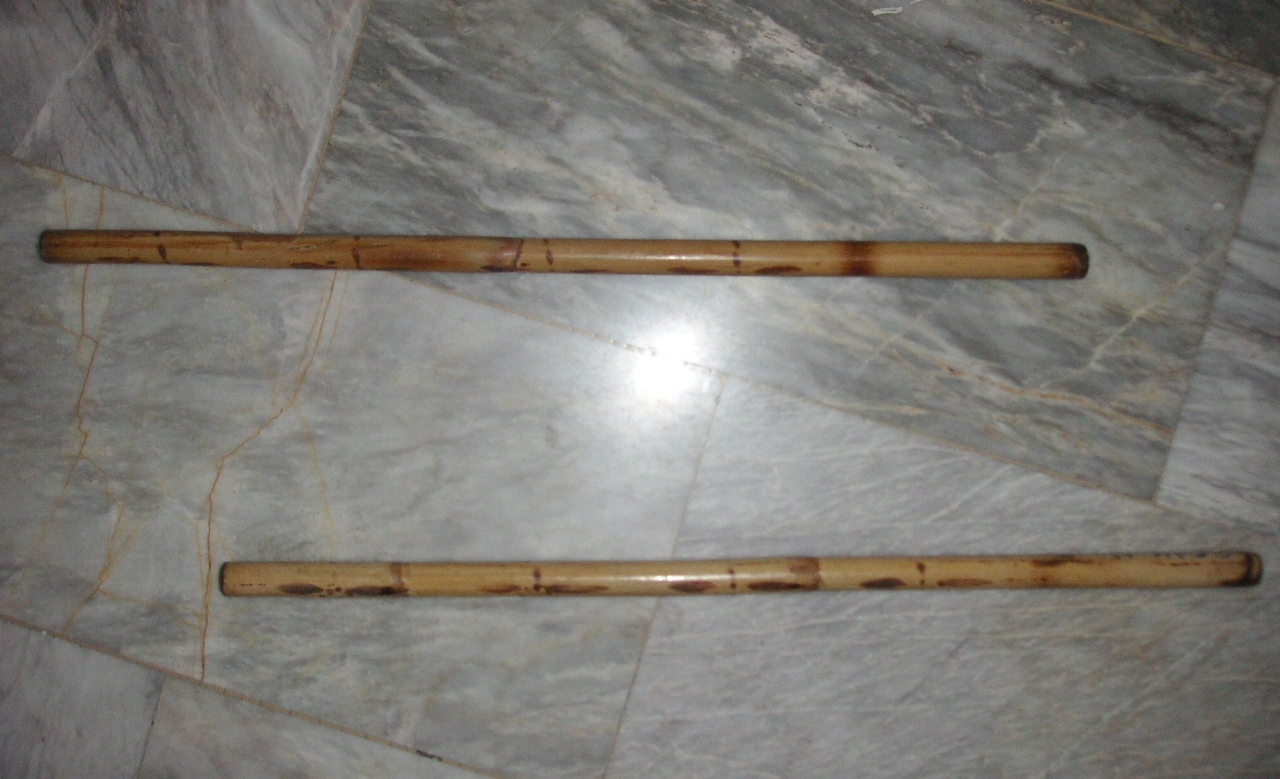
A pair of rattan bastons

The most basic and common weapon in Arnis is the baston or yantok. They are typically constructed from rattan, an inexpensive stem from a type of Southeast Asian vine. Hard and durable yet lightweight, it shreds only under the worst abuse and does not splinter like wood, making it a safer training tool. This aspect makes it useful in defense against blades. Kamagong (ironwood or ebony) and bahi (heart of the palm) are sometimes used after being charred and hardened. These hardwoods are generally not used for sparring, however, as they are dense enough to cause serious injury, but traditional sparring does not include weapon to body contact. The participants are skilled enough to parry and counterstrike, showing respect in not intentionally hitting the training partner. In modern times, many Arnis practitioners have also come to wear head and hand protection while sparring with rattan sticks, or otherwise use padded bastons. Some modern schools also use sticks made out of aluminium or other metals, or modern high-impact plastics.

=== Impact weapons ===
- Baston, olisi, yantok: stick ranging from twenty-four to twenty-eight inches long
- Largo mano yantok: longer stick ranging from twenty-eight to thirty-six inches
- Dulo y dulo: short stick about four to seven inches in length, held in the palm of the hand
- Bankaw: six-foot pole. Staves can be used to practise sword techniques
- Wooden dagger measuring 12 to 14 inches (300 to 360 mm)
- Panangga: shield
- Improvised weapons: Wood planks, steel pipes, umbrellas, flashlights, rolled-up magazines/ newspapers, books, cellular phones, tennis rackets, butt of billiards cue, bottles, coffee mugs, chair legs, tree branches or twigs, etc.

=== Edged weapons ===
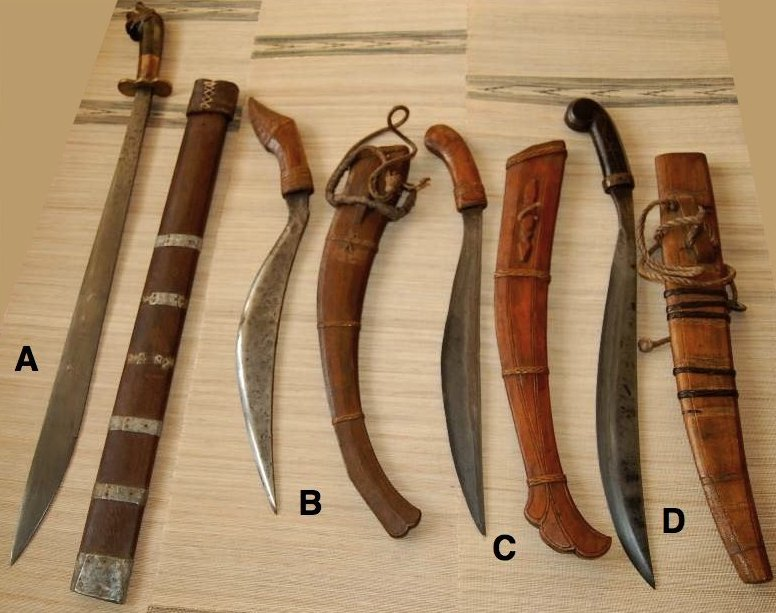
Traditional bolos from the Visayas islands (ginunting on the left, and three talibongs).

Baraw is a Cebuano term used in eskrima that means knife or dagger. The term Baraw is more commonly used on the Cebu Island in the Visayan region whereas other islands and regions more commonly use the term Daga but both terms are often interchangeable within the Filipino martial arts community.

The terms Baraw and Daga can be used either as Solo Baraw or Solo Daga associated with single knife fighting and defense systems, Doble Baraw or Doble Daga associated with the double knife fighting systems or even with a combination of long and short weapons e.g. stick and dagger fighting systems Olisi Baraw or sword and dagger fighting systems Espada y Daga.

- Daga/Cuchillo (Spanish for dagger and knife) or Baraw/ Pisaw: daggers or knives of different shapes and sizes
- Balisong: butterfly knife or fan knife from Barrio, Balisong in Batangas province; the handle is two-piece and attaches to a swivel that folds to enclose the blade when shut
- Karambit: claw-shaped Indonesian blade held by inserting the finger into a hole at the top of the handle
- Bolo: a knife/sword similar to a machete
- Pinuti: a type of sword from Cebu blade shaped similar to a Sundang but elongated
- Iták or sundáng: a farm or house hold bladed implement; its blade has a pronounced belly, chisel ground edge with the handle angled down
- Barong: wide flat leaf-shaped blade commonly used by Muslim Filipino ethnic groups such as the Tausug, Sama-Bajau and the Yakan.
- Binakoko: long blade named after a porgy fish
- Dinahong palay: has a very narrow blade shape similar to a rice leaf
- Kalis: Larger, thicker Filipino kris
- Kampilan: fork-tipped sword, popular in the southern Philippines
- Sibat: spear
- Improvised weapons: Icepicks, box cutters, screwdrivers, scissors, broken bottles, pens, car keys (using the push knife grip)

=== Flexible weapons ===
- Sarong: a length of fabric wrapped around the waist
- Ekut: handkerchief
- Tabak-toyok: chained sticks/ flail or nunchaku
- Latigo (Spanish for whip): consisting of a handle between 8 and 12 inches (200 and 300 mm), and a lash composed of a braided thong 3–20 ft (0.91–6.10 m) long. The "fall" at the end of the lash is a single piece of leather 10–30 inches (250–760 mm) in length.
- Improvised weapons: Belt, bandana, handkerchiefs, shirts, towels/socks with hard soap bars/rocks, ropes, power cables, etc.

== Rank and grading system ==
The practitioners must conform to criteria based on the number of years of training and level of proficiency in technical skills. Practitioners are screened by the rank promotion committee to determine their rank in the grading system. Note: Most systems do not have a belt based grading system. this is a western affectation and is not followed in systems like IKAEF, IKSA, Lameco, Inosanto-Lacosta, Balicki etc. that use titles only.

Arnis grading system
Rank	Belt	English name	Filipino name
White Belt		Novice	Baguhán
Yellow		Intermediate 1	Sanáy 1
Green		Intermediate 2	Sanáy 2
Blue		Intermediate 3	Sanáy 3
Brown		Advanced	Bihasâ
Black		Master 1	Lakán/Lakámbini 1
Black		Master 2	Lakán/Lakámbini 2
Black		Master 3	Lakán/Lakámbini 3
Black		Master 4	Lakán/Lakámbini 4
Black		Master 5	Lakán/Lakámbini 5
Black		Master 6	Lakán/Lakámbini 6
Black		Master 7	Lakán/Lakámbini 7
Black		Master 8	Lakán/Lakámbini 8
Black		Master 9	Lakán/Lakámbini 9
Black		Grand Master	Dakilang Lakán/Lakámbini 10

== Technical aspects ==
=== Ranges ===
Most systems recognize that the technical nature of combat changes drastically as the distance between opponents changes, and generally classify the ranges into at least three categories. Each range has its characteristic techniques and footwork. Of course, some systems place more emphasis on certain ranges than others, but almost all recognize that being able to work in and control any range is essential. The Balintawak style for example, uses long-, medium- and short-range fighting techniques, but focuses on the short-range.

To control the range, and for numerous other purposes, good footwork is essential. Most eskrima systems explain their footwork in terms of triangles: normally when moving in any direction two feet occupy two corners of the triangle and the step is to the third corner such that no leg crosses the other at any time. The shape and size of the triangle must be adapted to the particular situation. The style of footwork and the standing position vary greatly from school to school and from practitioner to practitioner. For a very traditional school, conscious of battlefield necessities, stances are usually very low, often with one knee on the ground, and footwork is complex, involving many careful cross-steps to allow practitioners to cope with multiple opponents. The Villabrille and San Miguel styles are usually taught in this way. Systems that have been adapted to duels or sporting matches generally employ simpler footwork, focusing on a single opponent. North American schools tend to use much more upright stances, as this puts less stress on the legs, but there are some exceptions.

Many systems, including the Inosanto/Lacosta system of escrima/kali recognize and teach 3 basic ranges: long range (largo), medium range (medio) and short range (corto). The long range is typically defined as being able to hit the opponents lead/weapon hand with your weapon/stick only. Medium range is where you are able to strike the opponent's body/head with your weapon/stick while also checking/monitoring the opponent's lead hand with your rear/live hand. And the short range is when you can strike the opponent's body/head with your rear/live hand or being able to strike the opponent's head/body with the hilt/punyo end of the weapon/stick. Some styles or systems may also define a closer range for elbows to the head or body, or grappling.

=== Strikes ===
Many Filipino systems focus on defending against and/or reacting to angles of attack rather than particular strikes. The theory behind this is that virtually all types of hand-to-hand attacks (barehanded or with a weapon) hit or reach a combatant via these angles of attack and the reasoning is that it is more efficient to learn to defend against different angles of attack rather than learn to defend against particular styles, particular techniques or particular weapons. For instance, the technique for defending against an attack angle that comes overhead from the right is very similar whether the attacker uses bare fists, a knife, a sword or a spear.

Older styles gave each angle a name, but more recent systems tend to simply number them. Many systems have twelve standard angles, though some have as few as 5, and others as many as 72. Although the exact angles, the order they are numbered in (numerado), and the way the player executes moves vary from system to system, most are based upon Filipino cosmology. These standard angles describe exercises. To aid memorization, player often practise a standard series of strikes from these angles, called an abecedario (Spanish for "alphabet"). These are beginner strikes or the "ABC's" of Arnis.

While most systems do incorporate a numbering system for the angles of attack, not all use the same numbering system, so always get clarification before training in a new system or style. Additionally, while the angles are numbered for ease of discussion, the numbers do not generally define how the attack is thrown. That is to say, usually (excluding thrusts) a #1 angle, means an attack that starts on the right side of the practitioner and comes down at about a 45° from right to left. But, it does not matter whether this is done with the right or left hand (forehand or backhand) or if the hit continues through the target or returns back along the same line.

Some angles of attack and some strikes have characteristic names:

- San Miguel – a forehand strike with the right hand, moving from the striker's right shoulder toward their left hip. It is named after Saint Michael the Archangel, who is often shown in traditional icons as holding a flaming, divine sword at this angle. This is the most natural strike for most untrained people. It is commonly referred to as "angle #1" in systems where striking angles are numbered for training purposes, because it is presumed the most probable angle of attack.
- Sinawalì – the double-stick weaving movement most associated with Arnis, it is named for woven coconut or palm leaves called sawalì that are used as walls of nipa huts. It is commonly seen in double-stick continuous attack-parry partner demonstrations.
- Redonda – a continuous, circular downward-striking, double-stick twirling technique. It whips in a circle to return to its point of origin. This is especially useful when using sticks rather than swords; it enables extremely fast strikes, but needs constant practice.
- Lobtik or Laptik – a through hit (forehand or backhand) where the weapon/stick swings through the target, coming from one side of the practitioners body and ending on the other side. Note: many systems do not allow the elbow to cross center (centerline) even though the stick or weapon is.
- Witik – a returning hit (forehand or backhand) in which the strike "bounces" off the target and comes back or returns to the same side as it started.
- Abanico – from the Spanish for "fan", it is done by flicking the wrist 180° in a fan-shaped motion. This kind of strike can be very quick and arrive from unexpected angles. This motion is often done in secession hitting targets from opposite sides creating a nearly 360° arc. And can be done in front of the practitioner or over the head.
- Pilantík – executed by whipping the stick around the wrist over the head in a motion similar to the abanico, but in alternating 360° strikes. It is most useful when fighters are in grappling range and cannot create enough space for normal strikes.
- Hakbáng – From the Filipino for "step" or "pace", it is a general term for footwork. For example, hakbáng paiwás is pivoting footwork, while hakbáng tátsulók is triangular footwork.
- Puño – Spanish for "fist", "hilt", or "handle". It uses the butt of a weapon, and often targets a nerve point or soft spot on the opponent. In skilled hands, the puño strike can be used to break bones.

Many Arnis techniques have Spanish names, because Spanish was the lingua franca spoken during colonial times among the natives, who spoke over 170 languages across 7,600 islands.

Arnis techniques are generally based on the assumption that both student and opponent are very highly trained and well prepared. Thus, Arnis tends to favour extreme caution, always considering the possibility of a failed technique or an unexpected knife. On the other hand, the practitioner is assumed to be capable of quick, precise strikes.

The general principle is that an opponent's ability to attack should be destroyed rather than trying to injure and convince them to stop. Many strikes are therefore aimed at the hands and arms, hoping to break the hand holding the weapon, or cut the nerves and tendons controlling it (the concept of "defanging the snake"). Strike to the eyes and legs are also important. This is summed up in a popular mnemonic: "Stick seeks bone, blade seeks flesh".

=== Mano Mano ===
Mano Mano is the empty-hand component of Filipino martial arts, particularly Arnis. The term translates as "hands" or "hand-[to]-hand" and comes from the Spanish mano ("hand"). It is also known as suntukan or panununtukan in Luzon and pangamot in the Visayas, as well as De Cadena, Cadena de Mano or Arnis de Mano in some FMA systems. American colonists referred to it as "combat judo" or "Filipino boxing".

Mano mano moves include kicking, punching, locking, throwing, and dumog (grappling). Filipino martial artists regard empty hands as another weapon, and all movements of Mano Mano are directly based on weapon techniques. In Arnis, weapons are seen as extensions of the body, so training with weapons naturally leads to proficiency in bare-handed combat. For this reason, Mano Mano is often taught in higher grades after weapons training has been mastered, as advanced students are expected to be able to apply experience with weapons to unarmed fighting. This not always the case though, as some systems of Arnis start with (and at times only consist of) empty hands fighting.

Some notable masters of Mano Mano include:

- Cacoy Canete
- Richard Bustillo
- Antonio Illustrisimo
- Venancio "Anciong" Bacon
- Rey Galang
- Edgar Sulite
- Danny Guba
- Francisco Guilledo
- Ceferino Garcia
- Gabriel Elorde

=== Kicking ===
Paninipa, Pagsipa, Pananadiyak, Pagtadiyak, and Sikaran (all terms for "kicking" in various regions, dialects and styles) are components of eskrima that focus on knees, tripping, low-line kicks, and stomps. Pananjakman is also a term used in Filipino-American-developed and Western FMA systems, usually referring to the system from the Lucky Lucaylucay, Floro Villabrille and Dan Inosanto blend lineage. Except for the distinct style of Sikaran from the Baras area of the province of Rizal, which also uses high kicks, kicking as a separate art is never taught by itself in the Philippines, and this practice is only done in the West with Pananjakman. Pananjakman is usually taught together with Panantukan.

Paninipa can be regarded as the study of leg muscles and bones and how they are connected, with the goal of either inflicting pain or outright breaking or dislocating the bones. Most striking techniques involve applying pressure to bend the target areas in unnatural ways so as to injure or break them. Such pressure may be delivered in the form of a heel smash, a toe kick, a stomp, or a knee. Targets include the groin, thighs, knees, shins, ankles, feet and toes. The upper body is used only for defensive maneuvers, making pananadiyak ideal for when combatants are engaged in a clinch. When used effectively, the strikes can bring an opponent to the ground or otherwise end an altercation by making them too weak to stand.

Fundamental techniques include kicking or smashing the ankle to force it either towards or away from the opposite foot (severe supination or pronation, respectively), heel-stomping the top of the foot where it meets the lower leg so as to break or crush the numerous bones or otherwise disrupt the opponent's balance, and smashing the opponents knee from the side to break the knee (with severe supination and pronation as the desired result).

=== Drills ===
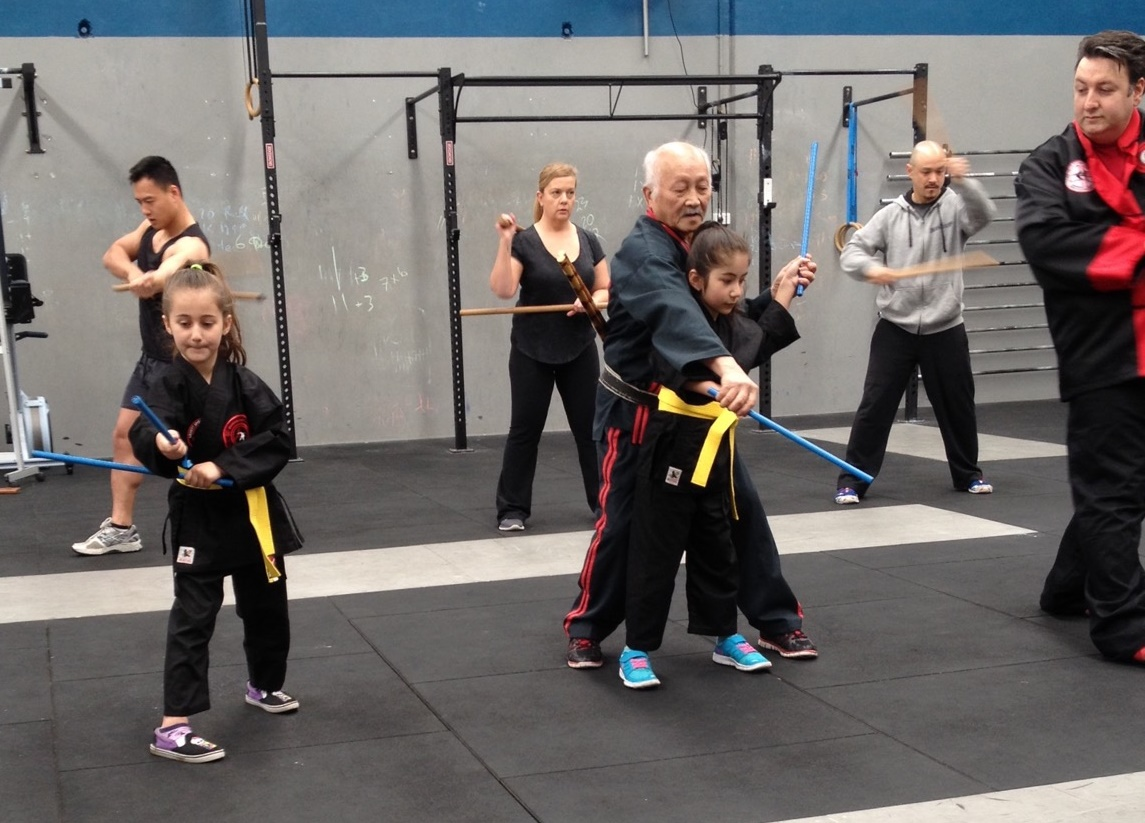
Kali stick drills during seminar at Ben Poon's Riseup Crossfit center by Terry Lim in Melbourne Australia

Several classes of exercises, such as sombrada, contrada, sinawali, hubud-lubud and sequidas, initially presented to the public as a set of organized drills by the Inosanto school, are expressly designed to allow partners to move quickly and experiment with variations while remaining safe. For example, in a sumbrada drill, one partner feeds an attack, which the other counters, flowing into a counterattack, which is then countered, flowing into a counterattack, and so on. The hubud-lubud or hubad-lubad from Doce Pares is frequently used as a type of "generator" drill, where one is forced to act and think fast. Initially, students learn a specific series of attacks, counters, and counter-attacks. As they advance they can add minor variations, change the footwork, or switch to completely different attacks; eventually the exercise becomes almost completely free-form. Palakaw, from the Balintawak style, are un-choreographed and random defensive and offensive moves. Palakaw in Cebuano means a walk-through or rehearsing the different strike angles and defenses. It may be known as corridas, or striking without any order or pattern. Disarms, take-downs, and other techniques usually break the flow of such a drill, but they are usually initiated from such a sequence of movements to force the student to adapt to a variety of situations. A common practice is to begin a drill with each student armed with two weapons. Once the drill is flowing, if a student sees an opportunity to disarm their opponent, they do, but the drill continues until both students are empty-handed. Some drills use only a single weapon per pair, and the partners take turns disarming each other. Seguidas drills, taken from the San Miguel system, are sets of hitting and movement patterns usually involving stick and dagger.

Rhythm, while an essential part of eskrima drills, is emphasized more in the United States and Europe, where a regular beat serves a guide for students to follow. To ensure safety, participants perform most drills at a constant pace, which they increase as they progress. The rhythm, together with the southern Filipino attire of a vest and sashed pants, is commonly mistaken for some sort of tradition when practising eskrima in the Philippines – perhaps incorrectly derived from traditional rhythm-based dances or an attempt to add a sense of ethnicity. Eskrima is usually practised in the Philippines without a rhythm, off-beat or out of rhythm. The diversity of Filipino martial arts means that there is no officially established standard uniform in eskrima.

=== The live hand ===
The live hand (or alive hand) is the opposite hand of the practitioner that does not contain the main weapon. The heavy usage of the live hand is an important concept and distinguishing hallmark of eskrima. Even (or especially) when empty, the live hand can be used as a companion weapon by eskrima practitioners. As opposed to most weapon systems like fencing where the off-hand is hidden and not used to prevent it from being hit, eskrima actively uses the live hand for trapping, locking, supporting weapon blocks, checking, disarming, striking and controlling the opponent.

The usage of the live hand is one of the most evident examples of how Eskrima's method of starting with weapons training leads to effective empty hand techniques. Because of Doble Baston (double weapons) or Espada y Daga (sword and parrying dagger) ambidextrous weapon muscle memory conditioning, Eskrima practitioners find it easy to use the off-hand actively once they transition from using it with a weapon to an empty hand.

=== Doble baston ===
Doble baston, and less frequently doble olisi, are common names for a group of techniques involving two sticks. The art is more commonly known around the world as Sinawali meaning "to weave". The term Sinawali is taken from a matting called sawali that is commonly used in the tribal Nipa Huts. It is made up of woven pieces of palm leaf and used for both flooring and walls.

This technique requires the user to use both left and right weapons in an equal manner; many co-ordination drills are used to help the practitioner become more ambidextrous. It is the section of the art that is taught mainly at the intermediate levels and above and is considered one of the most important areas of learning in the art.

=== Sinawali ===
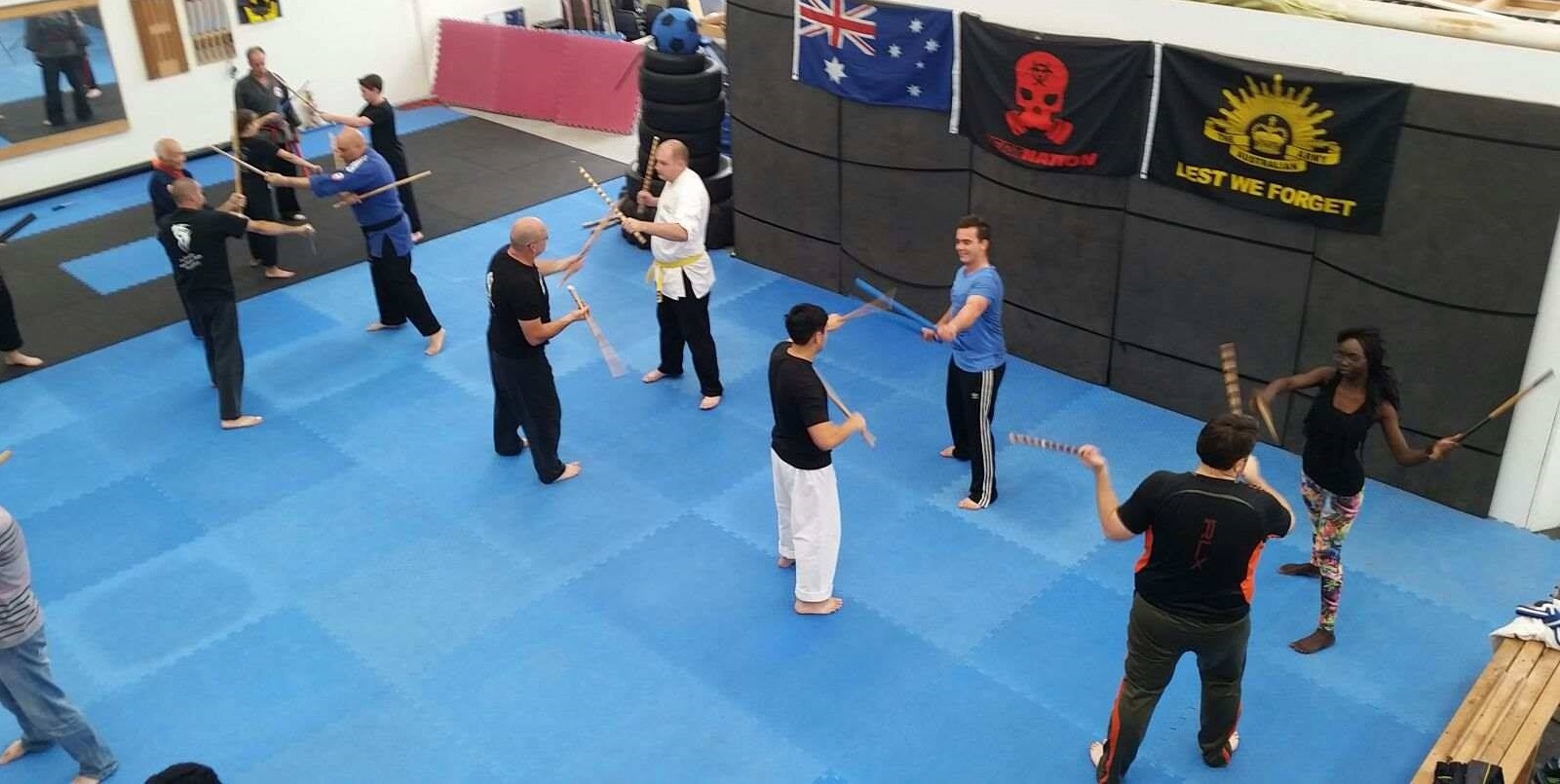
Practising Sinawali activity at Arnis seminar by Terry Lim at Marcos Dorta's Essential Defence Academy in Melbourne, Australia

Sinawali refers to the activity of "weaving", as applied Eskrima with reference to a set of two-person, two-weapon exercises. The term comes from "Sawali", the woven material that typically forms the walls of nipa huts.

Sinawali exercises provide eskrima practitioners with basic skills and motions relevant to a mode of two-weapon blocking and response method called Doblete. Sinawali training is often introduced to novices to help them develop certain fundamental skills – including: body positioning and distance relative to an opponent, rotation of the body and the proper turning radius, recognition of one's center of gravity, eye–hand coordination, target perception and recognition, increased ambidexterity, recognition and performance of rhythmic structures for upper body movement, and muscular developments important to the art, especially, the wrist and forearm regions. It helps teach the novice eskrimador proper positioning while swinging a weapon.

== Cross-training ==
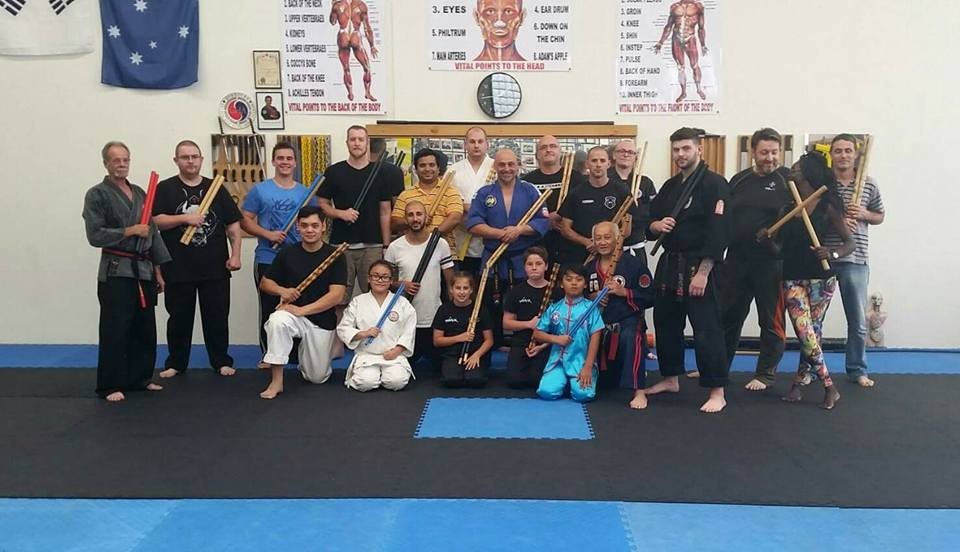
Kali stick seminar by Terry Lim at Marcos Dorta's Essential Defence Academy of combat Jiu Jitsu in Melbourne Australia

The Chinese and Malay communities of the Philippines have practiced eskrima together with Kuntaw and Silat for centuries, so much so that many North Americans mistakenly believe silat to have originated in the Philippines.

Some of the modern styles, particularly Doce Pares and Modern Arnis contain some elements of Japanese Martial Arts such as joint locks, throws, blocks, strikes, and groundwork, taken from: Jujutsu, Judo, Aikido and Karate as some of the founders obtained black belt Dan grades in some of these systems. Some eskrima styles are complementary with Chinese Wing Chun because of the nervous system conditioning and body mechanics when striking, twirling or swinging sticks.

In Western countries, it is common to practice eskrima in conjunction with other martial arts, particularly Wing Chun, Jeet Kune Do and silat. As a result, there is some confusion between styles, systems, and lineage, because some people cross-train without giving due credit to the founders or principles of their arts. For example, American Kenpo and Kajukenbo cross-training traces back to the interactions between Chinese, Japanese and Filipino immigrants in territorial/pre-statehood Hawaii, and to a lesser extent in other parts of the United States. In the United States the cross-training between eskrima and Jeet Kune Do Concepts as headed by Dan Inosanto of the Inosanto Academy in Marina del Rey, California, goes according to the maxim "Absorb what is useful, reject what is useless".

Proponents of such training say the arts are very similar in many aspects and complement each other well. It has become marketable to offer eskrima classes in other traditional Asian martial arts studios in America but some practitioners of other eskrima styles often dismiss these lessons as debased versions of original training methods.

== See also ==
- Arnis in the Philippines
- Filipino martial arts
- Doce Pares
- Balintawak Eskrima
- Modern Arnis
- Pekiti-Tirsia Kali
- Suntukan
- Sikaran
- Kinamutay
- Yaw-Yan
- Juego del palo
- Silat
- Jendo
- Kenpo
- World Eskrima Kali Arnis Federation (WEKAF)
- International Arnis Federation (IAF)
- Arnis Philippines International Federation (iARNIS)
- World Modern Arnis Alliance (WMAA)
