= World Eskrima Kali Arnis Federation =

International governing body for eskrima martial arts

- Abbreviation: WEKAF
- Formation: August 11, 1989, 37 years ago
- Type: Sports federation
- Headquarters: Cebu City, Philippines
- President: (United States) Steve Wolk
- Website: wekafinternational.com

The World Eskrima Kali Arnis Federation (WEKAF) is the international sports body for the sport of Arnis, a Filipino martial art.

== History ==
WEKAF was formed on August 11, 1989, after a convention was held at the Sacred Heart Center in Cebu City. Dionisio Cañete was elected as their charter president. Cañete would formalize rules and regulations to professionalized the sport of Arnis.

The first WEKAF World Championship in Cebu City also commenced on that date and lasted until August 13, 1989.

With ten member national federations upon its inception, WEKAF grew to around 40 members by 2016.

== Member federations ==
The following nations and territories have membership with the WEKAF.

- Austria
- American Samoa
- Australia
- Belgium
- Brazil
- China
- Colombia
- Denmark
- Belgium
- Canada
- Chile
- Fiji
- France
- Germany
- Hawaii (Note: Constituent state of the United States, Hawaii has separate membership in the WEKAF)
- Hong Kong
- Hungary
- India
- Indonesia
- Iran
- Ireland
- Italy
- Japan
- Liechtenstein
- Luxembourg
- Mexico
- Netherlands
- New Zealand
- Norway
- Philippines
- Puerto Rico
- Poland
- Portugal
- Qatar
- Réunion
- Romania
- Saudi Arabia
- Slovakia
- South Korea
- Switzerland
- Spain
- Tonga
- Turkey
- United Arab Emirates
- United Kingdom
- United States
- Vietnam

== WEKAF World Championships ==
WEKAF World Championships
Competition details
- Discipline: Arnis
- Type: Biennial
- Organiser: World Eskrima Kali Arnis Federation (WEKAF)

History
- First edition: 1989 in Cebu City, Philippines
- Editions: 17 (2024)
- Final edition: 2022 in Mandaue, Philippines

The World Eskrima Kali Arnis Federation holds the World Championships every two years with hosting typically alternating between the Philippines and another country.

Edition	Year	Host member	Location	Dates	Ref.
1	1989	Philippines	Cebu City	August 11–13	
2	1992	Philippines	Manila	January 25–27	
3	1994	Philippines	Manila		
4	1996	United States	Los Angeles		
5	1998	Philippines	Cebu City		
6	2000	Philippines	Cebu City		
7	2002	United Kingdom	London	July 4–6	
8	2004	Philippines	Cebu City		
9	2006	United States	Orlando	July 2–9	
10	2008	Philippines	Cebu City	July 22–25	
11	2010	Mexico	Puerto Vallarta	July 19–24	
12	2012	Philippines	Cebu City	July 18–24	
13	2014	Hungary	Debrecen	July 23–27	
14	2016	Philippines	Mandaue	July	
15	2018	Hawaii	Lahaina	July 18–23	
—N/a	2020	Philippines	Lapu-Lapu City	July (Cancelled (Note: Cancelled due to the COVID-19 pandemic))	
16	2022	Philippines	Mandaue	July 17–21	
17	2024	Philippines	Mandaue	July 25-27	
18	2026	India	Srinagar	July 27-31	

== See also ==
- Doce Pares
- Jendo
