= Leandro Leviste =

Filipino businessman and politician (born 1993)

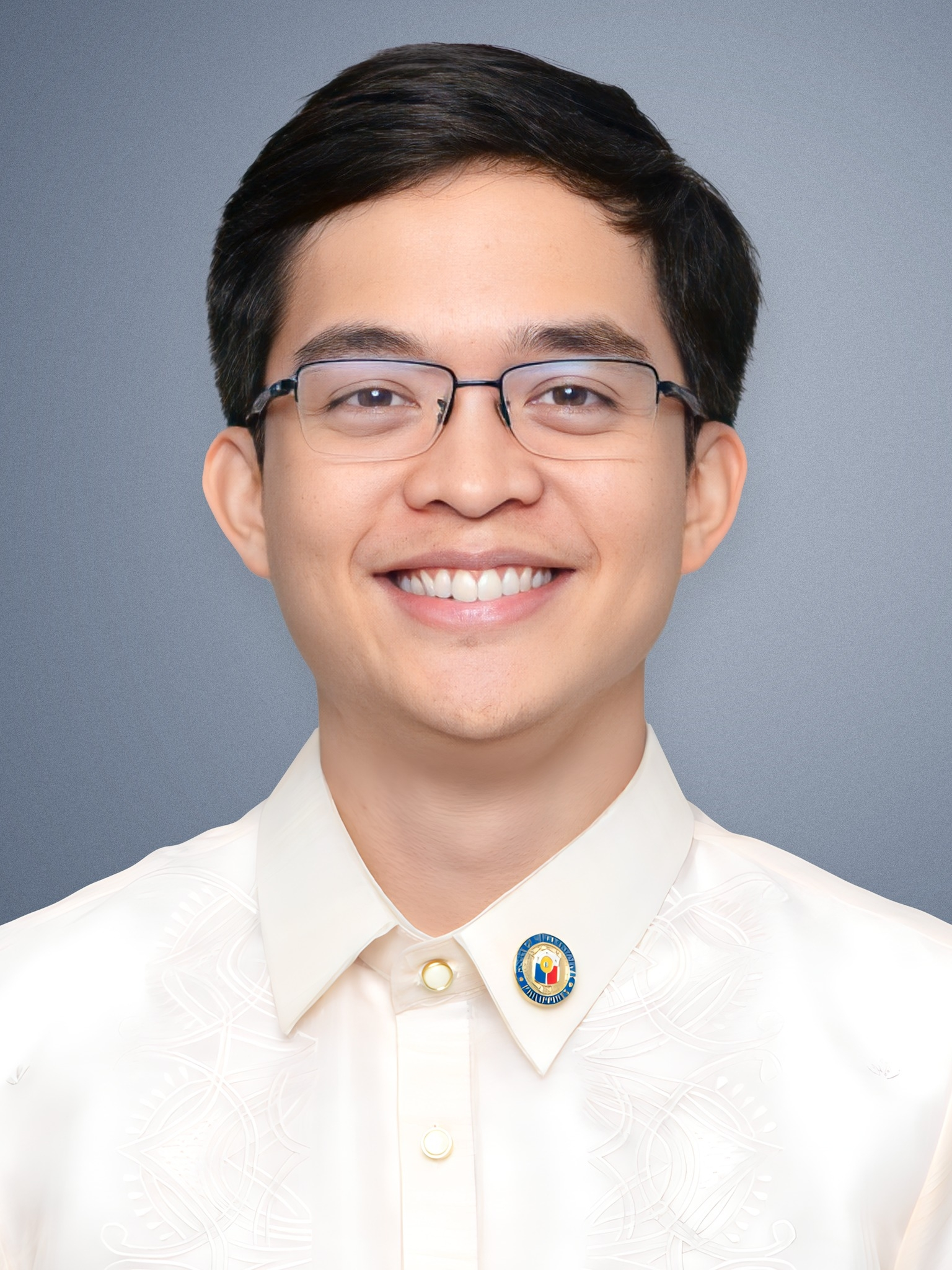
- Official portrait, 2025

Member of the Philippine House of Representatives from Batangas' 1st district
- Incumbent
- Assumed office June 30, 2025
- Preceded by: Eric Buhain

Personal details
- Born: Leandro Antonio Legarda Leviste; March 18, 1993 (age 33) Makati, Philippines
- Party: Lakas–CMD (2025–present)
- Other political affiliations: Independent (2024–2025)
- Relations: Toni Leviste (half-sister); Antonio Legarda Jr. (uncle); Mark Leviste (cousin)
- Parents: Antonio Leviste; Loren Legarda
- Education: Yale University (dropped out)
- Occupation: Politician
- Profession: Businessman

Leandro Antonio Legarda Leviste (born March 18, 1993) is a Filipino businessman and politician, currently serving as the representative of Batangas's 1st congressional district since 2025. He is the son of former Batangas Governor Antonio Leviste and Senator Loren Legarda.

He is the founder of Solar Philippines and was claimed to be a "self-made billionaire"; although his wealth has been attributed to plunder, graft, and unexplained surge in wealth where he was initially reported to have a capital of only 1 million pesos, which suddenly became 1 billion pesos in a few days. His career has been marked by significant regulatory failures and legal scrutiny, where his wealth has mostly originated from the lobbying efforts and conflict-of-interests of his mother, Loren Legarda, who was Senate committee chair on finance when the solar franchise was granted to Leviste. In early 2026, the Department of Energy imposed a final ₱24-billion penalty against his firm for non-compliance across 28 "ghost contracts" which renewable energy projects that failed to reach even the ground-breaking stage.

He and his mother flew and escaped outside the country in August 2026, amid plunder and graft investigations.

== Early life and education ==
Leviste was born on March 18, 1993, to former Batangas Governor Antonio Leviste and broadcaster Loren Legarda, who would later serve as a Philippine senator.

Leviste became interested in building a solar power business in the Philippines in 2013. He was interning at Meralco during a summer break from Yale University, where he was studying political science. Leviste was inspired by Elon Musk’s companies, Tesla, Inc. and SolarCity, which led him to feel there was a business opportunity at home to supply solar power more cheaply than what Filipinos were paying for electricity generated from fossil fuels.

He later dropped out from Yale, during his second year and returned to Manila to pursue business ventures. In 2015, he established Solar Philippines Commercial Projects Holdings, Inc. (SPCC). The initial capital for his solar initiatives was secured using family-owned agricultural land as per his father's lead in Batangas as collateral for bank loans. To finance the construction of a 106-hectare solar farm, SPCC pledged its total common shares to a consortium of three banks. The project involved the installation of approximately 200,000 photovoltaic (PV) panels, marking his transition from an educational background in the United States to large-scale infrastructure development in the Philippines.

== Business career ==
In 2013, Leviste founded Solar Philippines. The company completed the Calatagan Solar Farm in 2016 and began operating its Tarlac solar farm in 2019. In 2021, Solar Philippines subsidiary SP New Energy Corporation (SPNEC) became the first-ever solar company to perform an initial public offering in the Philippines. As a result, Leviste became the youngest chairman and CEO of a company on the Philippine Stock Exchange. In 2024, the Manila Bulletin named him the youngest self-made billionaire in the Philippines.

Meralco invested ₱15.90 billion in primary shares of SPNEC for the construction of SPNEC's 3500 MW Meralco Terra Solar Farm in Nueva Ecija, the world's single largest solar-battery project. In 2024, SPNEC, under Meralco's leadership, was able to raise the funding from banks and foreign investors for the ₱200 billion project, including the largest foreign investment for an infrastructure project in Philippine history.

Between 2023 and 2025, Leviste sold 14.60 billion shares of SPNEC to Meralco from Leviste for ₱18.26 billion and 1.84 billion shares of SPNEC to public shareholders for ₱2.23 billion. In total, Leviste has sold 16.44 billion shares for ₱20.49 billion. After these transactions, Leviste still owns 8.16 billion shares of SPNEC.

Leviste has invested in media by buying a 10% in media giant ABS-CBN Corporation, making him its largest shareholder after its parent company Lopez Holdings Corporation Through Countryside Investments Holdings Corporation, Leviste has also announced plans to invest ₱5 billion in Roxas Holdings, Inc., the parent company of Central Azucarera Don Pedro, Inc.

== House of Representatives (since 2025) ==
=== Election ===
In the 2025 election, Leviste ran for representative in Batangas's first district, based in the Western portion of the province. Challenging incumbent representative Eric Buhain.

Leviste garned 74.58% of the votes. His raw vote total of 268,764 is the highest received by any candidate in a congressional race in the history of Batangas.

=== Early tenure ===
On the first day of his term on June 30, 2025, Leviste filed House Bill No. 27 to provide a monthly allowance of ₱1,000 to every Filipino student, from kindergarten to college, regardless of their socioeconomic status.

In February 2026, Leviste entered negotiations to sell his remaining 16.3% stake in SP New Energy Corp. (SPNEC) to foreign investors, including the Japanese conglomerate Mitsui & Co., to prevent conflict of interest as a public official.

== Controversies ==
=== Solar franchise plunder and graft controversy ===
In January 2026, after media attention gave a limelight to the controversial solar franchise project of Loren Legarda's son, Leandro Leviste, former Buhay Party-List Representative Lito Atienza exposed that back in 2018, Legarda, then-chair of the Philippine Senate Committee on Finance, attempted to influence the approval of a solar energy franchise for a recent company founded by then 21-year-old Leviste, who dropped out of college. Atienza noted that even former president Gloria Macapagal-Arroyo, a Duterte ally who was previously imprisoned for plunder, as well as the then-governor of Antique, the province of Legarda, tried to arrange meetings for his approval. In the meetings, Legarda tried to utilize her position as appropriations chair to get Atienza's approval.

Atienza opposed the franchise initially after learning that the billion-peso franchise was being applied by Leviste, who only had one million pesos in capital. After he pointed out the capital issue, Legarda and Leviste changed their capital immediately to one billion pesos, making it more questionable for Atienza as to where they got the one billion peso fund. During the private discussions, Atienza claimed that he realized Leviste never intended to light up remote communities in the Philippines through the solar franchise. Rather, Leviste intended to eventually sell-off the solar franchise to earn billions of profit for him and his mother. Because of this, as well as intense pressure from powerful politicians, Atienza relented but only after he inserted a legal clause which would void the franchise if it were sold or transferred, effectively defeating Leviste's purpose for pushing the solar franchise. The solar franchise was approved in 2019 under the administration of President Rodrigo Duterte.

An ethics complaint was filed before the Senate Ethics Committee under Senator Manny Pacquiao in 2018 regarding the solar franchise controversy of Leviste, but the complaint was never acted upon. A letter on conflict-of-interest allegations was also sent in 2019 to Ombudsman Samuel Martires, a Duterte appointee, but the complaint was ignored.

Later in 2025, it was revealed that Leviste indeed sold-off the solar franchise to earn billions of profit for himself and his family, in violation of the legally-binding clause that Atienza inputted. The Department of Energy imposed a ₱25 billion fine against Leviste for violating the solar franchise law in January 2026.

On July 31, 2026, the new Ombudsman, Jesus Crispin Remulla, announced a preliminary probe on Leviste and Legarda, over anomalies concerning the solar franchise, alleging plunder and graft, which are non-bailable once filed at the Sandiganbayan. On August 7, 2026, the NBI confirmed that Leviste and his mother Legarda have left the country, escaping from their plunder and graft cases.

=== Flood control projects scandal ===
On August 26, 2025, Leviste filed bribery and corruption cases against suspended Department of Public Works and Highways (DPWH) Batangas first district Engineer Abelardo Calalo before the Office of the Batangas Provincial Prosecutor, alleging that Calalo attempted to bribe him ₱3.1 million to stop a House probe into alleged corruption involving DPWH's flood control and infrastructure projects in the district. He also urged Calalo to serve as a state witness in such an investigation.

After this, the Batangas 1st district representative demanded that the Department of Public Works and Highways (DPWH) investigate the flood control projects in his district. This is following the initiative of current President Bongbong Marcos to launch an investigation about the possible corruption and anomalies after the past administration's spending on disaster risk and management has failed and caused a lot of damages after typhoons.

Related to the bicameral committee's probe of the anomalies of said flood control projects during the Duterte administration, Leviste stepped with his loaded accusations about local district engineers. This all after major players in the investigation like President Bongbong Marcos, Senator Panfilo Lacson, Pasig City Mayor Vico Sotto have laid out their evidences of graft and corruption in government projects.

=== Regulatory penalties ===
In 2022, the Philippine government concluded its first Green Energy Auction Program (GEAP), describing it as a milestone in the country's climate and energy policy. Under the programme, developers competed to offer the lowest bid prices for the construction of renewable energy projects, including solar and wind facilities, with the government guaranteeing offtake for the awarded capacity.

The initial auction was fully subscribed, with all 2 gigawatts (GW) of the government‑allocated capacity awarded. The contracted projects were scheduled for completion by 2025. Following reports on project non-compliance, Leviste's SPPHI is required to settle financial obligations amounting to approximately ₱24 billion, consisting of performance bonds and other related liabilities.

Of this amount, about ₱14 billion corresponds to performance bonds mandated under the Green Energy Auction Program (GEAP). The Department of Energy reported that 33 contracts awarded to SPPHI, representing an estimated total capacity of about 11,427.83 megawatts (MW), were cancelled on the grounds of non‑delivery.

In January 2026, Ombudsman Boying Remulla confirmed that an investigation was underway regarding the alleged unauthorized transfer of a congressional franchise held by firms associated with Leandro Leviste. The inquiry centers on whether Leviste's sale of controlling interests in his solar ventures; specifically to the group of Manuel V. Pangilinan (MGen/Meralco)—violated the terms of Republic Act No. 11357, which granted a 25-year franchise to Solar Para sa Bayan Corp. (SPBC).

During a public broadcast on January 10, 2026, Remulla characterized the transaction as "franchise flipping," asserting that legislative franchises are state-granted privileges intended for public service rather than commercial trade. The Ombudsman emphasized that under Philippine law, the transfer of a national franchise requires prior approval from Congress, which Remulla alleged was not obtained. In response, Leviste stated that SPBC had been inactive for several years and that its franchise was "ipso facto revoked" in 2022 due to non-operation, arguing that he currently holds no active congressional franchise.

Representative Zia Alonto Adiong (Lanao del Sur–1st) criticized Leandro Leviste's business practices, comparing his non-performing solar initiatives to "ghost projects." Adiong argued that Leviste's sale of his company after being granted a 25-year congressional franchise while failing to fulfill the power production promises associated with that franchise constituted a "reneging" of his obligations to the state. Adiong emphasized that a congressional franchise is a state-granted privilege that should not be sold to escape responsibility for project delivery.

The Department of Energy (DOE) subsequently imposed a ₱24-billion penalty on Leviste's firm, Solar Philippines Power Project Holdings Inc. (SPPPHI). This fine was issued due to the company's failure to meet its commitments under more than 30 government service contracts. According to Energy Secretary Sharon Garin, Leviste's firm accounted for approximately 64% of all terminated renewable energy contracts in the Philippines for the 2024–2025 period, representing over 11,400 megawatts of undelivered power.

In May 2026, Garin elevated the DOE's complaint against Leviste and several SPBC directors to the Department of Justice (DOJ), alleging that they failed to comply with the terms of the legislative franchise granted to them to provide renewable energy sources for the Philippines. Citing violations of the Public Service Act, Garin filed the complaint before the DOJ on May 6.

== Electoral history ==
Electoral history of Leandro Leviste
Year	Office	Party	Votes received				Result
Year	Office	Party	Total	%	P.	Swing	Result
2025	Representative (Batangas–1st)	Independent	268,764	74.58%	1st	—N/a	Won
