= Candidates in the 2019 Philippine Senate election =

These are the people who, at one time or another, had been considered, announced, declined or withdrew his or her candidacy in the 2019 Philippine Senate election.

== Incumbents not term limited ==
Seven incumbents filed candidacies for senator.

- Sonny Angara (LDP)
  Angara was included in Senator Koko Pimentel's list of prospective candidates for the PDP-Laban-led coalition that he sent to President Duterte for approval. Angara filed his candidacy on October 17.
- Bam Aquino (Liberal)
  Aquino was suggested by Senator Franklin Drilon to run. Aquino filed his senatorial candidacy on October 16.
- Nancy Binay (UNA)
  Binay was included in Senator Koko Pimentel's list of prospective candidates for the PDP-Laban-led coalition that he sent to President Duterte for approval.
- JV Ejercito (NPC)
  Ejercito was nominated by Senate President Pimentel; Ejercito was non-committal if he would run. He said by January 2018 that it depends on the decision of his father, Manila Mayor Joseph Estrada, as he prefers to avoid running with his half-brother Jinggoy Estrada. By April, Pimentel revealed that they considered Ejercito over Estrada, saying that they prefer incumbents, and that it was his commitment to Ejercito. Ejercito left the Pwersa ng Masang Pilipino, his father's party, in favor of the Nationalist People's Coalition (NPC), and will be running under the NPC banner.
- Koko Pimentel (PDP–Laban)
  Pimentel filed a candidacy to run for Senator despite serving his second term. Under the Philippine Constitution only, one is only allowed to serve two consecutive terms as Senator. Pimentel's candidacy was disputed by lawyers Ferdinand Topacio and Glenn Chong who filed cases before the Commission on Elections to disqualify Pimentel's candidacy. The Comelec dismissed the cases stating that Pimentel is eligible to run for another term due to being unable to serve his first term completely from 2007 to 2013 due to an electoral protest. Migz Zubiri served his seat until Pimentel was officially declared the winner.
- Grace Poe (Independent)
  Poe said in early July 2018 that she was unsure if she'd run in 2019, considering that she said that her husband was "traumatized" by what happened in 2016. Poe, who had been a guest candidate when she first ran in 2013, said she hasn't received any offers this time from any party to run. Poe filed her senatorial candidacy on October 15 as an independent.
- Cynthia Villar (Nacionalista)
  Villar announced her candidacy in April 2018, adding that the Nacionalistas will field in Representative from Taguig Pia Cayetano, and Ilocos Norte governor Imee Marcos.

== Potential candidates ==
These persons were considered as potential candidates or have been named by someone else as a potential candidate.

- Ombudsman Conchita Carpio-Morales
  Morales was suggested by Senator Bam Aquino to run under their Resistance slate, however, Morales maintained that she will retire from government after her Ombudsmanship.
- Representative from Taguig Pia Cayetano (Nacionalista)
  Cayetano was suggested by Speaker Alvarez to run. In April, senator Cynthia Villar confirmed that Cayetano will run for the Senate under the Nacionalista banner.
- Representative from Ilocos Norte Rodolfo Fariñas (PDP–Laban)
  Fariñas was suggested by Senate President Pimentel to run. Fariñas said that he prefers to retire instead after his term ends in 2019, for now.
- Jiggy Manicad (PDP–Laban), TV journalist
  Manicad, who hosted and reported for several GMA Network news programs, resigned on April 20, 2018, days after appearing as a choice in a Pulse Asia opinion poll. Manicad said that he shall enter a "new level of public service". Pimentel said that Manicad was included in his shortlist as he was already a party member.
- Leah Navarro, singer
  Navarro was suggested by the Opposition bloc to run for senator.
- Former Presidential Communications Undersecretary Manolo Quezon
  Quezon was suggested by the Opposition bloc to run.
- Former party-list Representative Barry Gutierrez (Akbayan)
  Gutierrez was included in the Liberal Party senatorial slate named by Senator Francis Pangilinan in mid-May.
- Representative from Bataan Geraldine Roman (PDP–Laban)
  Roman was suggested by Speaker Alvarez to run.
- Former Secretary of the Interior and Local Government Mar Roxas (Liberal)
  Roxas declined to run again. Roxas lost the 2016 presidential election. When sought for comments in May 2018, Roxas said that he'll "cross that bridge" when it gets there. When asked in August 2018, Roxas was still unsure of his plans, in an interview at Leni Robredo's radio show.
- Presidential political adviser Francis Tolentino (Independent)
  Tolentino was suggested by Speaker Alvarez to run.
- Representative from Oriental Mindoro Reynaldo Umali (PDP–Laban)
  Umali was suggested by Speaker Alvarez to run.

== Declared candidacies ==
These are the people who have personally publicly announced their intention to run for a Senate seat.

- Party-list representative Gary Alejano (Magdalo)
  Alejano was suggested by Senator Antonio Trillanes to run. Alejano said that he would follow what the party decides on the matter. Alejano was included in the senatorial slate named by Senator Francis Pangilinan in mid-May. Alejano later announced his candidacy in June 2018, after accepting Magdalo's nomination. Trillanes said that Magdalo's nomination was unanimous.
- Senator Bam Aquino (Liberal)
  Aquino was presented in the first batch of the Liberal Party's Senate line-up on September 25, 2018.
- Former Party-list Representative Neri Colmenares (Makabayan)
  A three-term party-list congressman who represented Bayan Muna, Colmenares accepted the unanimous nomination of party-list organizations under the Makabayan umbrella as their standard-bearer in a party convention held on September 25, 2018. Having placed 20th overall in the 2016 senatorial elections as a candidate under the Grace Poe-led Partido Galing at Puso coalition, he might run as an independent without support from any major coalition this time but may be teaming up with another former congressman and media personality, Lorenzo "Erin" Tañada, under the Makabayan aegis (Tañada being its guest candidate) and with the support of people's organizations and cause-oriented groups.
- Former Commission on Human Rights Commissioner Jose Manuel Diokno (Liberal)
  Diokno was included in the Liberal Party senatorial slate named by Senator Francis Pangilinan in mid-May. Diokno was presented on the first batch of the Liberal Party's Senate line-up on September 25, 2018.
- Bureau of Corrections Director Ronald dela Rosa (PDP–Laban)
  Dela Rosa, when he was still the chief of the Philippine National Police, was suggested by Senator Manny Pacquiao to run. Dela Rosa had earlier said that he was open to run for senator. In September 2018, dela Rosa announced his intentions to run for a Senate seat, as he swore his oath in becoming a member of the ruling PDP-Laban.
- Former Senator Jinggoy Estrada
  Estrada stated he will run for senator because he wants to be in par with half-brother, senator JV Ejercito. He announced this on April 10, 2018, and wanted to run under the administration ticket, but if he would not be picked by them, he would still run as an independent. Estrada left the Senate in 2016 as a member of the United Nationalist Alliance after being term limited in 2016.
- Former Bangsamoro Transition Council member Samira Gutoc-Tomawis (Liberal)
  Gutoc-Tomawis was suggested by the Opposition bloc to run.
- Former Senator Lito Lapid (NPC)
  Lapid is "seriously considering" making a comeback to the upper chamber of Congress according to Senate Majority Leader Tito Sotto.
- Romulo Macalintal, lawyer
  Macalintal, the lawyer of Leni Robredo on Bongbong Marcos' vice presidential protest against her, said that he will run as an independent candidate in Robredo's preferred coalition.
- Representative from Maguindanao Zajid Mangudadatu (PDP–Laban)
  Mangudadatu was suggested by Speaker Alvarez to run.
- Governor Imee Marcos (Nacionalista)
  Imee Marcos, Governor of Ilocos Norte and daughter of former President Ferdinand Marcos and Imelda Marcos.
- Presidential Spokesman Harry Roque (People's Reform Party)
  Roque's priority as of the moment was "to be the best spokesman that I can be for the president." By October, Duterte successfully persuaded Roque not the run for the Senate, the latter ran as a nominee of the Luntiang Pilipinas in the party-list election, instead. However, Roque changed his mind and filed his candidacy on the last day, running under the People's Reform Party of now deceased Miriam Defensor Santiago.
- Former Senator Bong Revilla (NPC)
- Former Representative from Quezon Erin Tañada (Liberal)
  Tañada was suggested by Senator Franklin Drilon to run. Tañada was included in the senatorial slate named by Senator Francis Pangilinan in mid-May. Tañada was presented on the first batch of the Liberal Party's Senate line-up on September 25, 2018.
- Senator Cynthia Villar (Nacionalista)
  Villar became the first incumbent to declare her intentions to run, announcing it in April 2018.

== Accepted candidacies ==
The filing of Certificate of Candidacies (COCs) was scheduled on October 1–5, 2018, although resolutions in the Senate and the House of Representatives pushed for the rescheduling of filing to October 11–17, 2018, as most parties have not yet finalized their senatorial slates. The commission acceded to Congress' requests, and filing ended on October 17.

The commission is expected to release a final list of candidates by January 23. The commission accepted all of the certificate as it saw it as a clerical task not to discriminate when filing. This is the list of those who filed, as long as they have Wikipedia articles, or were elected into office above the barangay level, or served in the government in the assistant secretary level or above:

Name	Party	Last government position
Freddie Aguilar	Independent	None
Gary Alejano	Liberal	Representative for Magdalo Party-List (since 2016)
Raffy Alunan	Bagumbayan	Secretary of the Interior and Local Government (1992–96)
Sonny Angara	LDP	Senator (since 2013)
Bam Aquino	Liberal	Senator (since 2013)
Nancy Binay	UNA	Senator (since 2013)
Pia Cayetano	Nacionalista	Representative from Taguig's 2nd district (since 2016)
Melchor Chavez	LM	None
Glenn Chong	KDP	former Representative from Biliran (2007–10)
Neri Colmenares	Makabayan	Representative for Bayan Muna (2007–16)
Ronald dela Rosa	PDP–Laban	Director-General of the Bureau of Corrections (2018)
Chel Diokno	Liberal	None
JV Ejercito	NPC	Senator (since 2013)
Juan Ponce Enrile	PMP	Senator (2004–16)
Jinggoy Estrada	PMP	Senator (2004–16)
Bong Go	PDP–Laban	Special Assistant to the President (2016–18)
Samira Gutoc	Liberal	ARMM assemblyperson from Lanao del Sur's 1st district
Florin Hilbay	Aksyon	Solicitor-General (2015–16)
Lito Lapid	NPC	Senator (2004–16)
Dong Mangudadatu	PDP–Laban	Representative from Maguindanao's 2nd district (since 2013)
Jiggy Manicad	Independent	None
Imee Marcos	Nacionalista	Governor of Ilocos Norte (since 2010)
Sergio Osmeña III	Independent	Senator (2010–16)
Koko Pimentel	PDP–Laban	Senator (since 2007)
Grace Poe	Independent	Senator (since 2013)
Bong Revilla	Lakas	Senator (2004–16)
Dan Roleda	UNA	Councilor of Manila from the 4th district (1992–98)
Mar Roxas	Liberal	Secretary of the Interior and Local Government (2012–15)
Erin Tañada	Liberal	Representative from Quezon's 4th district (2004–13)
Francis Tolentino	PDP–Laban	Presidential Adviser on Political Affairs (2017–18)
Cynthia Villar	Nacionalista	Senator (since 2013)

- All people running who were appointed in government shall deemed to have been resigned from their positions upon filing their candidacies.
