= Loren Legarda =

Senator of the Philippines since 2022

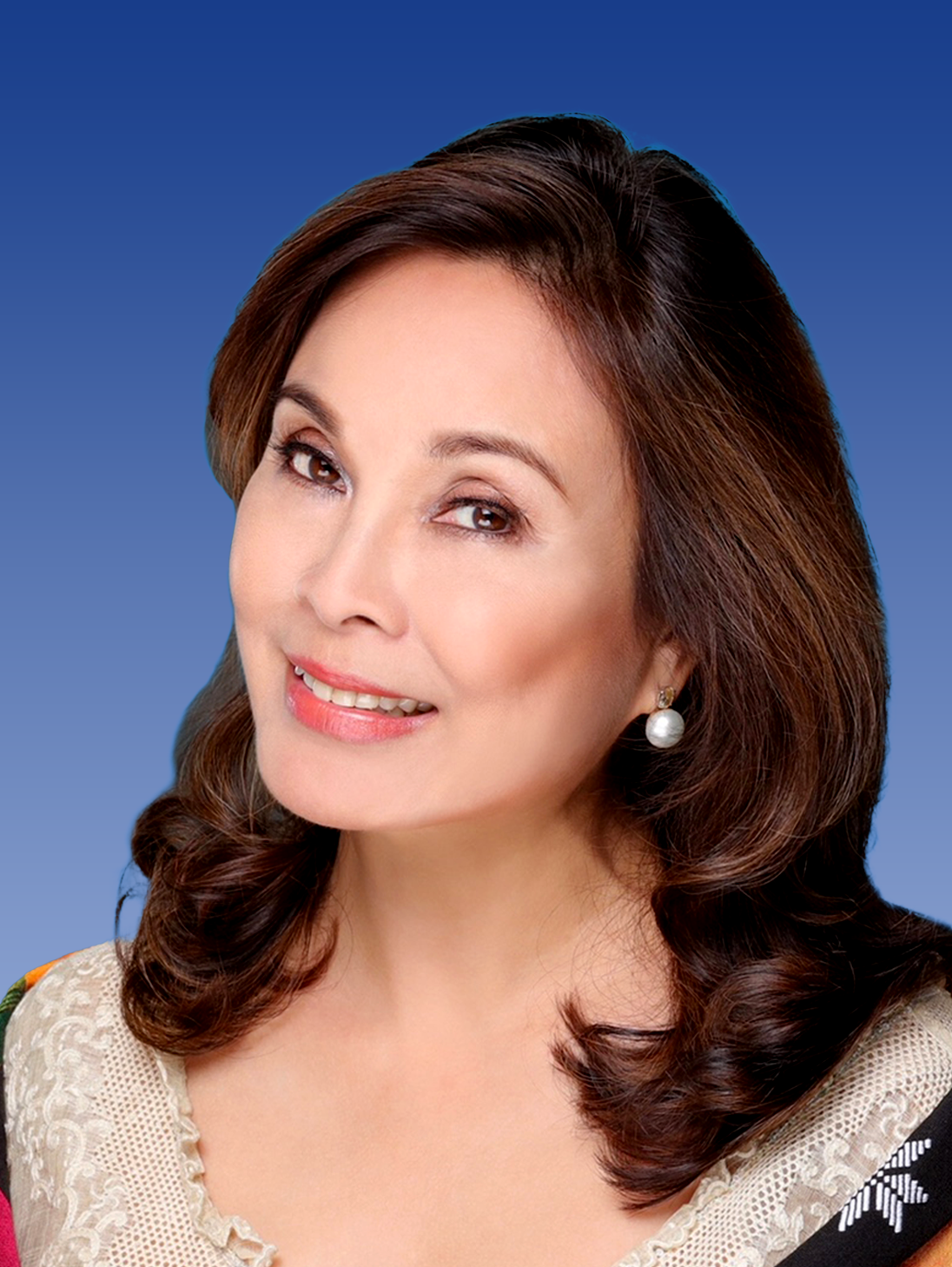

President pro tempore of the Senate of the Philippines
- In office May 11, 2026 – June 3, 2026
- Preceded by: Panfilo Lacson
- Succeeded by: Sherwin Gatchalian
- In office July 25, 2022 – May 20, 2024
- Preceded by: Juan Miguel Zubiri (acting)
- Succeeded by: Jinggoy Estrada

Senator of the Philippines
- Incumbent
- Assumed office June 30, 2022
- In office June 30, 2007 – June 30, 2019
- In office June 30, 1998 – June 30, 2004

Senate Majority Leader
- In office July 23, 2002 – January 12, 2004
- Preceded by: Aquilino Pimentel Jr.
- Succeeded by: Francis Pangilinan
- In office July 23, 2001 – June 3, 2002
- Preceded by: Francisco Tatad
- Succeeded by: Nene Pimentel
Senate positions
Chair of the Senate Foreign Relations Committee
In office May 18, 2017 – June 30, 2019
Preceded by	Alan Peter Cayetano
Succeeded by	Koko Pimentel
In office July 26, 2010 – July 22, 2013
Preceded by	Miriam Defensor Santiago
Succeeded by	Miriam Defensor Santiago
Chair of the Senate Finance Committee
In office July 25, 2016 – June 30, 2019
Preceded by	Francis Escudero
Succeeded by	Sonny Angara
Chair of the Senate Environment and Natural Resources Committee
In office July 22, 2013 – July 25, 2016
Preceded by	Migz Zubiri
Succeeded by	Cynthia Villar
Chair of the Senate Climate Change Committee
In office December 9, 2009 – June 30, 2019
Preceded by	new office
Succeeded by	Nancy Binay
Chair of the Senate Agriculture and Food Committee
In office February 2, 2009 – July 22, 2013
Preceded by	Edgardo Angara
Succeeded by	Kiko Pangilinan

Deputy Speaker of the House of Representatives of the Philippines
- In office July 22, 2019 – June 30, 2022 Serving with several others
- Speaker: Alan Peter Cayetano; Lord Allan Velasco

Member of the Philippine House of Representatives from Antique's at-large district
- In office June 30, 2019 – June 30, 2022
- Preceded by: Paolo Javier
- Succeeded by: Antonio Legarda Jr.

Personal details
- Born: Lorna Regina Bautista Legarda; January 28, 1960 (age 66) Malabon, Rizal, Philippines
- Party: NPC (2005–present)
- Other political affiliations: KNP (2004); Independent (2003–2005); Lakas–NUCD (1998–2003)
- Spouse: Antonio Leviste (m. 1989; ann. 2008)
- Children: 2 (including Leandro)
- Relatives: Antonio Legarda Jr. (brother)
- Education: University of the Philippines Diliman (BA); National Defense College of the Philippines (MNSA)
- Occupation: Politician
- Profession: Journalist
- Website: Loren Legarda; Luntiang Pilipinas

Military service
- Allegiance: Philippines
- Branch/service: Philippine Army
- Rank: Colonel

Lorna Regina "Loren" Bautista Legarda (born January 28, 1960) is a Filipino politician and former journalist who has served as a senator of the Philippines since 2022, following previous terms spanning from 1998 to 2004 and 2007 to 2019. During her tenure as senator, she served as the president pro tempore of the Senate of the Philippines from 2022 to 2024, and from May 11, 2026, to June 3, 2026. She also served for one term in the House of Representatives from 2019 to 2022.

Legarda has focused her political career towards environmentalism and culture, as well as international engagements with organizations connected with the United Nations, while being criticized as a political butterfly. During the impeachment trial of Sara Duterte, she and her youngest son, Representative Leandro Leviste, flew out of the country in August 2026, amid plunder and graft investigations.

== Early life ==
Loren Legarda was born on January 28, 1960, in Malabon (then a municipality in Rizal) as Lorna Regina Bautista Legarda, the only daughter of Antonio Cabrera Legarda and Maria Salome Basilia "Bessie" Gella Bautista. Her maternal grandfather was Jose P. Bautista, editor-in-chief of the pre-Martial Law newspaper, The Manila Times.

As a teenager, she appeared as a print and television model. She attended Assumption College from primary to high school. She graduated from the University of the Philippines Diliman in 1981 with a bachelor's degree in Broadcast Communications and was President of the UP Broadcast Association. She pursued post-graduate courses on special studies towards professional designation in journalism from the University of California, Los Angeles.

== Career in journalism and broadcasting ==
Legarda began a career in journalism as a reporter for RPN, during which she covered topics including Imelda Marcos' trip to Kenya and the People Power Revolution. During this period, she obtained a master's degree in National Security Administration from the National Defense College of the Philippines, graduating at the top of the class with gold medals for Academic Excellence and Best Thesis. Later, she would move to the reopened ABS-CBN. She became the co-anchor of the television newscast, The World Tonight with Angelo Castro, Jr., and became the host of the current affairs series, The Inside Story.

As a journalist, Loren earned the Gawad Cultural Center of the Philippines, Catholic Mass Media Hall of Fame, Kapisanan ng mga Brodkaster ng Pilipinas Golden Dove Award, Ten Outstanding Young Men (TOYM) from the Philippine Jaycees (1992), The Outstanding Women in the Nation's Service (TOWNS) Award (1995), and the Benigno Aquino Award for Journalism (1995), among more than 30 awards.

She is also the presenter of Dayaw, a 6-part series about Philippine heritage and culture. The show has been given a continuous series annually. In January 2018, the fourth season of Dayaw premiered in ANC, while a separate show dedicated to Filipino cuisine and raw ingredients is being planned for a later showing. In February 2018, Legarda and the NCCA launched the Buhay na Buhay television series which focused on eight living sub-cultures of Filipino culture. She also hosts Maaram, a series of documentaries on intangible cultural heritage, which premiered in ANC in 2024.

In December 2017, Legarda and director Brillante Mendoza partnered for a documentary the series, entitled, "Our Fragile Earth: Protected Areas of the Philippines," began airing in ANC on December 8. The series features the Camotes Island Mangrove Swamp Forest Reserve, El Nido Managed Resource Protected Area, Puerto Princesa Subterranean River National Park (UNESCO World Heritage Site), Sagay Marine Reserve, Mounts Banahaw–San Cristobal Protected Landscape, Rasa Island Wildlife Sanctuary, Coron Island, Mount Hamiguitan (UNESCO World Heritage Site), and Lake Sebu, which is part of the Allah Valley Protected Landscape. The series also features the Banaue Rice Terraces, which is a UNESCO World Heritage Site, and the Verde Island Passage.

== Political career ==
=== 1998 Senate bid, first term ===
Legarda ran for the Senate in 1998 under the Lakas-NUCD-UMDP Party. She was elected with more than 15 million votes, rendering her the highest number of votes in that year's election and becoming the second woman to top a Philippine senatorial election. Upon Legarda filing her candidacy as senator in late 1997, Tina Monzon-Palma who came from rival ABC (now TV5) and was the anchor of The Big News, transferred to ABS-CBN in order to replace her on The World Tonight at the same time and joining Angelo Castro, Jr. in order to run the latter for this election. In 1999, the newscast was replaced by Pulso: Aksyon Balita on ABS-CBN and was moved to the ABS-CBN News Channel, where it has aired.

Legarda was named as one of the "Global Leaders for Tomorrow" by the World Economic Forum in Davos, Switzerland in 2000, and was awarded by the United Nations Environmental Program (UNEP) in Turin, Italy, for her work on the environment in 2001. Legarda played a role in the 2000–01 impeachment trial of Joseph Estrada that sparked the Second EDSA Revolution, voting to examine the envelope containing evidence of alleged corruption of the Estrada administration. She was later chosen to be the Senate's Majority Floor Leader from 2001 to 2004, becoming the first woman to hold the position.

=== 2004 vice presidential bid ===
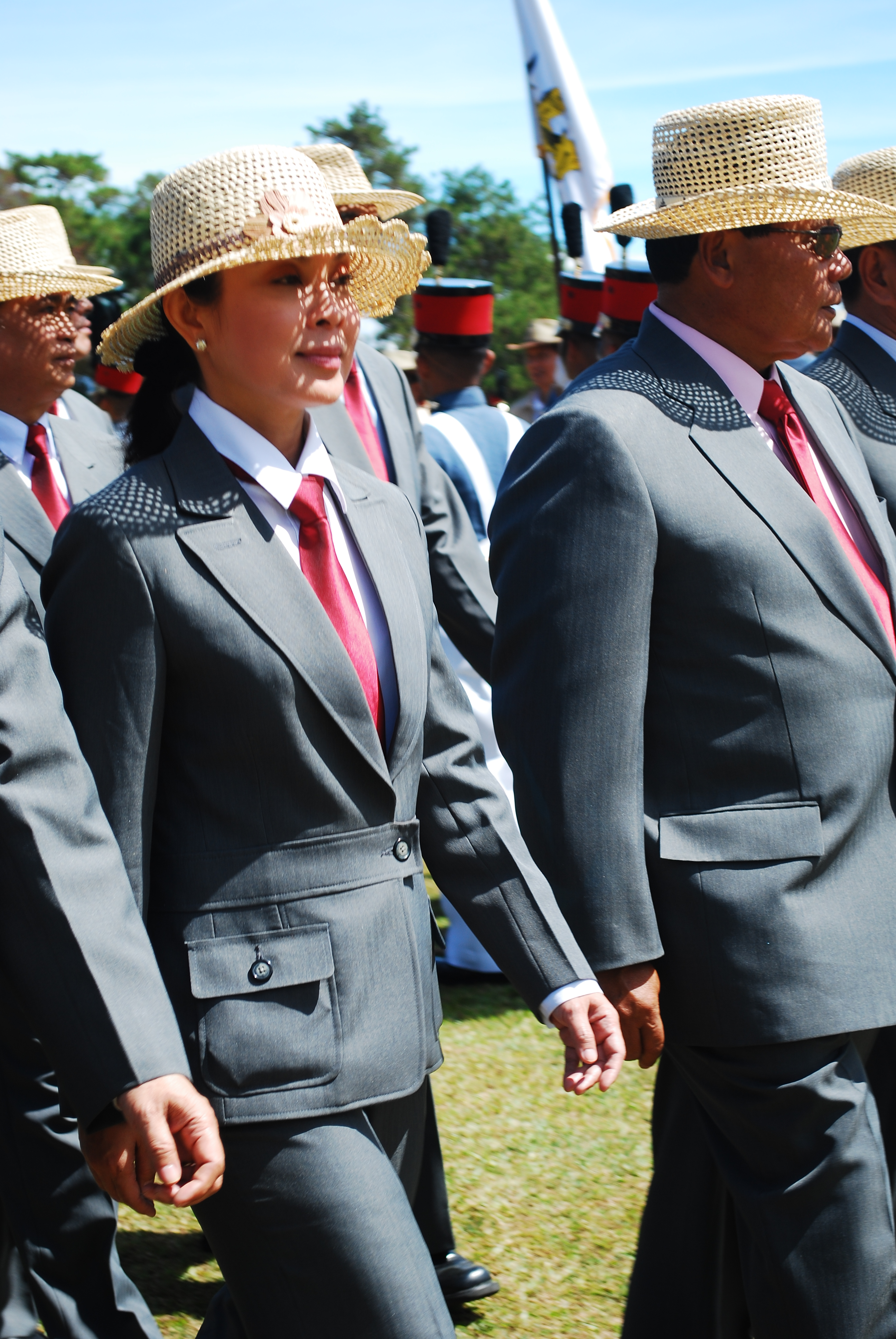
Legarda during a 2007 Philippine Military Academy ceremony

In 2003, Legarda left Lakas–CMD (after Gloria Macapagal Arroyo broke her pledge not to run again for president) and joined the Koalisyon ng Nagkakaisang Pilipino coalition of Fernando Poe, Jr. as an independent during the 2004 elections. She lost the election to Noli de Castro, the running mate of Arroyo, under a narrow margin of 3.9%. Legarda's running mate, Fernando Poe, Jr., was a strong ally of then-ousted President Joseph Estrada. Legarda previously voted to open the controversial envelope that would have helped in the conviction of Estrada during his 2001 impeachment trial.

On January 18, 2008, in a 21-page resolution, penned by Senior Justice Leonardo Quisumbing, the Supreme Court of the Philippines, acting as the Presidential Electoral Tribunal (PET), dismissed Legarda's electoral protest against de Castro.

=== 2007 Senate bid, second term ===
In 2007, Legarda decided to run again for Senate under the banner of the Genuine Opposition coalition. In her second term as senator, Legarda authored the Expanded Senior Citizens Law, the Climate Change Act, Clean Air Act, Renewable Energy Act, the Magna Carta for Micro, Small and Medium Enterprises (MSME) Act, Barangay Kabuhayan Act, the Magna Carta on Women, University of the Philippines Charter of 2008, Bacolor Rehabilitation Council Act, Tourism Act of 2009, Universal Newborn Hearing Screening and Intervention Act of 2009, Food and Drug Administration Act of 2009, and the Cheaper and Quality Medicines Act. The Climate Change Act was lauded by the United Nations as the 'best in the world'. She co-authored the National Cultural Heritage Act. Aside from her legislative work, she also established the Luntiang Pilipinas (Green Philippines) foundation, an organization aimed to aid the Philippines in attaining its United Nations mandate for reforestation, where the target was set by the UN at 2009.

During this period, Legarda was a known critic of Senate President Manny Villar. On November 18, 2008, Legarda was among the senators who was supposed to vote for Villar's ouster, but Villar resigned instead. Legarda afterwards voted in favor of Juan Ponce Enrile as the new Senate president. Also in 2008, she was chosen as "United Nations International Strategy for Disaster Reduction Asia Pacific Regional Champion for Disaster Risk Reduction and Climate Change Adaptation", and she participated in the Global Platform on Disaster Risk Reduction, the BBC World Debate: ‘Prevent or React’, and the Forum on the Human Impact of Climate Change in Geneva, Switzerland. In October 2009, the Climate Change Act was passed. She filed this bill two years ago, citing inspiration from the Albay Declaration, the outcome document of the First National Conference on Climate Change Adaptation, as it called for “the passage of a policy prioritizing climate change adaptation in the national agenda”. She was a member of the Philippine delegation during the 2009 Copenhagen Summit.

=== 2010 vice presidential bid ===
On July 14, 2009, Legarda expressed her interest to run as president during the 2010 elections. On October 23, 2009, during the launch of her humanitarian program "Lingkod Loren in Luneta", she formally declared her intention to run for vice president in 2010 under Nationalist People's Coalition with the platform of environmentalism. After Francis Escudero, expected to run for president, left the NPC, she decided that it would be best to stick with the Nacionalista Party's presidential candidate, Manny Villar, as a guest-running mate. She previously criticized Villar before the candidacies were announced.

Legarda lost her bid for the Philippine vice presidency to Jejomar Binay, placing third in the 2010 Philippine presidential elections, while her running mate Villar lost to Noynoy Aquino. As a result, she continued her term in the Senate. In 2010, Legarda was given chairmanship for the Senate committees on climate change, cultural communities, and foreign affairs. She would later go to the United Nations to deposit the Philippines ratification for the International Criminal Court membership. As a result of Koko Pimentel's win in his case against Migz Zubiri, Legarda requested the Supreme Court to allow them to retrieve documents that they submitted as evidence for her electoral protest against de Castro for the reopening of the investigation of electoral cheating in the 2004 and 2007 elections.

=== 2013 Senate bid, third term ===
Legarda run for reelection in 2013 under the slate of President Noynoy Aquino, the foe of her running mate, Manny Villar, in the 2010 presidential elections. She won second place after Grace Poe, the daughter of the late Fernando Poe Jr., her 2004 presidential running mate. During the 2013 campaign, she had a major fall-out against Alan Peter Cayetano. After her re-election, she chaired the Senate Committee on Environment and Natural Resource and the Senate Committee on Finance. In 2014, she was tagged as one of the politicians involved in the pork barrel scam with the codename of ''Dahon'' (''Leaf''), alluding to her reputation as an environmentalist which was used as her facade for corruption. She was awarded as a United Nations Global Champion for Resilience in 2015 due to her advocacy and actions on climate change and environmentalism. In the 2016 presidential elections, Legarda supported the candidacy of Grace Poe, but later backed the presidency of Rodrigo Duterte after the latter won the elections.

Legarda was one of only 8 lawmakers who were in favor of Gina Lopez retaining the environment secretary post during her confirmation hearing which ousted Lopez from her position. She was absent during the Senate resolution vote which sought to condemn the controversial burial of the late dictator Ferdinand Marcos in the Libingan ng mga Bayani in November 2016. She was among the 14 senators who filed a resolution urging the Supreme Court to review its ouster decision in regards to the quo warranto petition against Maria Lourdes Sereno.

In 2017, pork-like sections worth P4.8 billion in the 2018 national budget of President Duterte were found. The budget was crafted by Legarda as Senate budget chair. In November 2017, she led the Philippine delegation at the 23rd UN Climate Change Conference (COP23) in Bonn, Germany. She was named the first ever National Adaptation Plan (NAP) Champion during the event. Legarda was part of the Philippine delegation during the Paris Agreement discussions. She was named Chevalier (Knight) in the Ordre national de la légion d’Honneur (National Order of the French Legion of Order).

She also focused on the enhancement of Philippine culture and the arts. She pushed for the National Writing Systems Bill, which aimed to institutionalize baybayin and other indigenous writing systems as national writing systems, the National Cultural Heritage Act, and the Department of Culture and the Arts bill, although the measures were not passed into law. On February 7, 2019, a bill which safeguards the 1,446 Gabaldon school heritage buildings of the country, authored by Legarda, was enacted into law.

Legarda filed various indigenous people rights, culture, women's rights, and children's rights bills. Legarda backed the SOGIE Equality Bill in the Senate. She led the Philippine delegation to the United Nations and urged tougher global actions against cybersex and child trafficking.

She supported the Philippine drug war of President Rodrigo Duterte, which has killed at least 30,000 civilians including children, but said that she does not support the police killings of innocent citizens.

She also authored the General Appropriations Act of 2017 and 2018 as Finance committee chair. She co-authored the Philippine Mental Health Law, HIV and AIDS Policy Act of 2018, Responsible Parenthood and Reproductive Health Act of 2012, and the Universal Access to Quality Tertiary Education Act. She also sponsored the Delimitation of the Exclusive Economic Zone Boundary agreement between the Philippines and Indonesia, which led to its ratification.

In 2018, she controversially lobbied for a billions-worth government solar franchise for her own son, then 21-year-old college dropout Leandro Leviste, while she was chair of the Philippine Senate Committee on Finance. During the lobbying, Leviste's capital was at 1 million pesos, however, after the matter was pointed out, Leviste changed it immediately to one billion pesos, leading to more questions and opposition from former Manila mayor and congressman Lito Atienza, who found the sudden surge in wealth highly suspicious. The franchise was approved in 2019 under President Rodrigo Duterte.

On the same year, more than P130 billion and “hundreds of billions” of pesos of illegal pork-like sections for the incoming 2019 national budget was revealed. The budget was crafted by Legarda as Senate budget chair and approved by the Duterte administration through the budget secretary.

=== 2019 House of Representatives bid, first term ===
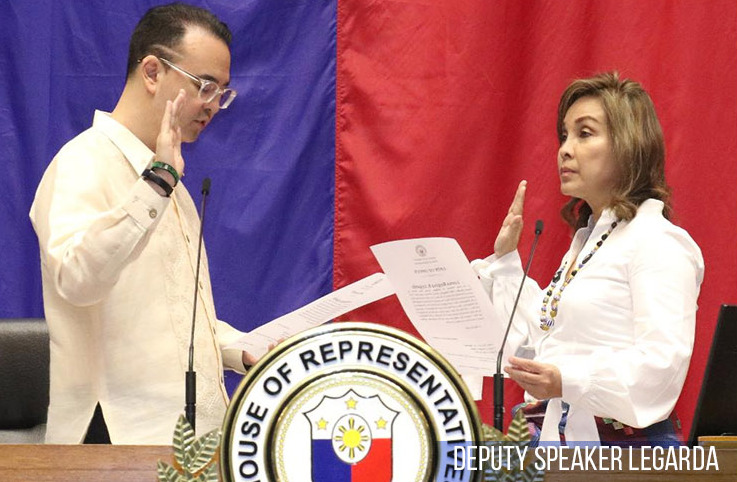
Legarda taking her oath of office as Deputy House Speaker on July 27, 2019

On October 18, Legarda announced that she will run as congresswoman of the lone district of Antique in Western Visayas in the 2019 Philippine elections, despite not residing in the province as she was grown and raised in Malabon. Her congressional run went to the court after a local politician argued against her candidacy. Legarda stated that her maternal great grandfather was from Antique. On February 6, 2019, the courts officially allowed Legarda to run for congresswoman of Antique province. Legarda was elected as the new congresswoman and representative of the province and district of Antique after the May 2019 elections, where she received a landslide victory against a political dynasty. She assumed the position on July 1, 2019.

=== 2022 Senate bid, fourth term ===
On October 1, 2021, she filed her certificate of candidacy to run for senator. She ran under the Nationalist People's Coalition, and is part of the Reporma-NPC slate, MP3 Alliance slate, and the UniTeam slate, and she also received a formal endorsement from Rodrigo Duterte.

Legarda supported the presidential candidacy of Bongbong Marcos, son of dictator Ferdinand Marcos, and the vice presidential candidacy of Sara Duterte, daughter of Rodrigo Duterte who launched the deadly Philippine drug war that killed over 30,000 civilians. Her decision led his eldest son, Lorenzo Leviste, to disown her. She won a seat in the 2022 Philippine Senate election, ranking 2nd in the race with 24 million votes, only behind actor and former convict Robin Padilla. She assumed office on June 30, 2022. In the same election, she mandated her brother AA to replace her for the lone district of Antique post, establishing a succession political dynasty.

On July 25, 2022, she held the position of Senate President pro tempore, until she was succeeded by Jinggoy Estrada, a senator previously jailed more than once for plunder.

During the 2025 elections, while retaining her seat as senator, Legarda mandated her brother AA to run for the lone district seat of Antique again, while her son Leandro Leviste run for one of the district posts in Batangas, expanding her political dynasty into two separate provinces.

In 2025, she voted to oust senator Chiz Escudero, her former party ally, in favor of senator Tito Sotto, who she convinced to run for the Senate presidency again. However, months later, she betrayed Sotto in favor of Alan Peter Cayetano who she previously had a major fallout back in 2013. Legarda sided with pro-Duterte senators to elect Alan Peter Cayetano as Senate President. Under Cayetano's Senate presidency, she was re-elected as Senate President pro tempore on May 11, 2026, after the controversial Senate shake-up. Less than a month later, Legarda and Cayetano were both ousted from their positions on June 3, 2026, by the Gatchalian-Sotto led bloc, making Legarda's term one of the shortest Senate president pro-tempore stint in Philippine history.

On August 7, 2026, the NBI confirmed that Legarda and her youngest son Leandro Leviste have left the country, escaping from their plunder and graft cases.

== Controversies ==
Legarda has been involved in several political controversies during her career, including disputes related to asset disclosure, political alliances, and Senate leadership changes.

=== Political butterfly ===
Legarda has been accused of being a political butterfly due to her alliance shifting throughout her political career. During the 2001 impeachment trial of President Erap Estrada, Legarda was among senators who voted to open the envelope that would have led to more convictions against Estrada. Estrada would later be jailed for plunder. Three years later in 2004, Legarda allied herself and became the vice presidential running mate of Fernando Poe, Jr., who was the strongest supporter of Estrada. Bost Legarda and Poe lost. Later in 2016, Legarda supported the presidential candidacy of Grace Poe, daughter Fernando Poe Jr. However, after the 2016 elections, Legarda backed the winning candidate and Poe's rival, Rodrigo Duterte.

During the period after the 2004 presidential elections, Legarda was a critic against President Gloria Macapagal-Arroyo, who would later be arrested for plunder and is a rival of Legarda's presidential tandem, Fernando Poe, Jr. By 2018, it was revealed that Legarda and Arroyo had become friends, and Arroyo helped Legarda in securing a solar franchise in 2019 for Legarda's college dropout son, Leandro Leviste. By 2026, the solar franchise embroiled Legarda and Leviste in a plunder and graft controversy.

In 2007, she was a critic of Senate president Manny Villar, who she intended to oust through a Senate vote due to the C-5 Road Extension controversy. Villar resigned before the ouster vote was made in November 2008. Two years later in 2010, Legarda allied herself and became the vice presidential running mate of Villar. Both Legarda and Villar lost. In the 2013 senatorial elections, Legarda allied herself with the senatorial slate of President Noynoy Aquino, the rival of Villar in 2010. By 2019, Legarda made a speech in the Senate, fondly calling then-senator Cynthia Villar, wife of Manny Villar, as her so-called "Mama Bear".

In 2013, Legarda had a fall-out against senator Alan Peter Cayetano, who she later described to senator Sonny Trillanes as a man who she cannot trust. In 2025, Legarda convinced senator Tito Sotto to become Senate president. She voted for Sotto and ousted senator Chiz Escudero, who she previously supported in 2010. A few months later in 2026, Legarda voted to oust Sotto in favor of Alan Peter Cayetano, her political nemesis since 2013. Cayetano afterwards appointed her as Senate president pro-tempore for less than a month, after which she and Cayetano were both ousted by the Gatchalian-Sotto bloc.

=== Pork barrel involvement ===
In 2014, during the pork barrel scam investigations, it was alleged that a certain politician with the codename of ''Dahon'' (''Leaf'') was involved in the scandal. The codename alluded to the politician's reputation for environmentalism as a facade for corruption. It was later revealed by state witnesses that Legarda, known for environmentalism, was involved in the scandal. Legarda denied the allegations.

In 2017, senator Ping Lacson raised the alarm bells regarding pork-like sections worth P4.8 billion in the 2018 national budget of President Duterte, which was crafted by Legarda, the Senate budget chair. Legarda dismissed the allegations, which led to Lacson telling Legarda to "be honest" about the pork insertions in the budget. In 2018, Lacson again raised concern after finding more than P130 billion and “hundreds of billions” of pesos of pork-like sections in the 2019 national budget of the Duterte administration, also crafted by Legarda and approved by the government's budget secretary.

=== Forbes Park and New York property disclosure controversy ===
In 2013, a graft complaint was filed against Legarda before the Office of the Ombudsman over allegations that she failed to declare a Forbes Park property in Makati in her Statements of Assets, Liabilities, and Net Worth (SALN) from 2007 to 2011. The complaint alleged that the property was concealed through a corporation. Legarda denied wrongdoing.

Another questionable property is located in New York City, which did not appear in her 2013 SALN. Legarda's camp later stated that they listed it since her 2007 SALN. Some information appear to contradict records at the New York City Registry of Property Deeds — specifically the cost of the unit, and who exactly owns it. Analysts point out that the actual value listed for her share of the unit does not match the peso vs dollar exchange rate when the property was bought.

In 2013, after allegations of questionable properties and her depiction as a political butterfly were made, Legarda filed Senate Bill No. 366, which sought to increase penalties under the Revised Penal Code for “incriminatory machinations” and acts deemed to constitute malicious intrigue against another person's reputation. The bill failed to be enacted as law.

=== Open letter from her son during the 2022 elections ===
During the 2022 Philippine elections, Legarda's eldest son, Lorenzo Legarda Leviste, published an open letter criticizing her decision to align politically with the Marcos–Duterte coalition. The letter gained significant attention on social media and in news outlets.

=== Solar franchise plunder and graft controversy ===
In January 2026, after media attention gave a limelight to the controversial solar franchise project of Legarda's son, Leandro Leviste, former Manila Mayor and congressman Lito Atienza exposed that back in 2018, Legarda, then-chair of the Philippine Senate Committee on Finance, attempted to influence the approval of a solar energy franchise for a recent company founded by her son, then 21-year old Leviste. Atienza noted that even former president Gloria Macapagal-Arroyo, a Duterte ally who was previously imprisoned for plunder, as well as the then-governor of Antique, the province of Legarda, tried to arrange meetings for his approval. In the meetings, Legarda tried to utilize her position as appropriations chair to get Atienza's approval. Legarda tried to bribe Atienza with 10 million pesos in public funds, stating ‘Alam mo Lito chairman ako ng Committee on Appropriations sa Senado, I can help you with your P10 million fund basta pumayag ka lang tutulungan mo ang anak ko’ (You know Lito, I'm the Senate finance committee chair, I can help you with a P10 million fund if you agree to help my son).

Atienza opposed the franchise initially after learning that the billion-peso franchise was being applied by Legarda's son, who only had one million pesos in capital. After he pointed out the capital issue, Legarda and Leviste changed their capital immediately to one billion pesos, making it more questionable for Atienza as to where they got the one billion peso fund. During the private discussions, Atienza claimed that he realized Leviste never intended to light up remote communities in the Philippines through the solar franchise. Rather, Leviste intended to eventually sell-off the solar franchise to earn billions of profit for him and his mother. Because of this, as well as intense pressure from powerful politicians, Atienza relented but only after he inserted a legal clause which would void the franchise if it were sold or transferred, effectively defeating Leviste's purpose for pushing the solar franchise. The solar franchise was approved in 2019 under the administration of President Rodrigo Duterte.

An ethics complaint was filed before the Senate Ethics Committee under Senator Manny Pacquiao in 2018 regarding the solar franchise controversy of Legarda and Leviste, but the complaint was never acted upon. A letter on conflict-of-interest allegations was also sent in 2019 to Ombudsman Samuel Martires, a Duterte appointee, but the complaint was ignored.

Later in 2025, it was revealed that Leviste indeed sold-off the solar franchise to earn billions of profit for himself and his family, in violation of the legally-binding clause that Atienza inputted. The Department of Energy imposed a 25 billion fine against Leviste for violating the solar franchise law in January 2026.

On July 31, 2026, the new Ombudsman, Jesus Crispin Remulla, announced a preliminary probe on Legarda and her son, Leandro Leviste, over anomalies concerning the solar franchise, alleging plunder and graft, which are non-bailable once filed at the Sandiganbayan. Following the revelations, Legarda was noted for her sudden absenteeism in the Senate. On August 7, 2026, the NBI confirmed that Legarda and Leviste have left the country, escaping from their plunder and graft cases.

=== 2026 senate leadership change ===
In May 2026, Legarda was linked to reports of a Senate leadership realignment that resulted in the election of Alan Peter Cayetano as Senate President. She voted in favor of the leadership change, which ousted Senator Vicente Sotto III amid speculation regarding the formation of a Duterte-aligned bloc in the Senate.

Following the leadership transition, the TOWNS Foundation Inc. released a statement expressing disappointment over her political decisions and urging her to reflect on her public legacy.

The same month, the student council of Assumption College San Lorenzo supported the removal of Legarda's portrait from the school's “Wall of Empowered Women,” citing disagreement with her role in the Senate leadership transition and concerns regarding accountability and democratic processes.

=== Bribery from Zaldy Co and alleged "flood control scandal" involvement ===
Early in 2026, when Legarda was still a member of the Tito Sotto-led majority, she was named in a joint affidavit submitted to the Office of the Ombudsman by 18 individuals who identified themselves as former security aides of former Ako Bicol representative Zaldy Co in connection with allegations surrounding the government's flood control program. After she supported the ouster of Sotto, and voted for pro-Duterte senator Alan Peter Cayetano as the new Senate President, the 18 aides who first accused Legarda, through their lawyer Levi Baligod, publicly recanted claims that Legarda had received cash kickbacks on June 8, 2026, stating that they had neither seen suitcases of money delivered to the senator nor personally seen her, a complete turnaround from their previous statements. Baligod, a Duterte ally, said that one aide had only witnessed Co entering Legarda's residence and that two suitcases initially prepared for delivery were ultimately not brought to her residence.

After they retracted their accusations against Legarda, the aides afterwards tagged senator Chiz Escudero and others in the scandal after Escudero and his peers previously retracted their support for Cayetano, who was later ousted by the Gatchalian-Sotto bloc.

=== Usage of "Antique roots" and establishment of political dynasty ===
Legarda, who was born and raised in Malabon in Metro Manila, has been criticized for establishing her own political dynasty based in the province of Antique in Western Visayas and in Batangas in southern Luzon. Legarda argued that since her maternal grandmother from the Gella clan is from Pandan, Antique, she is also a child of the province despite never residing in the province before the 2019 elections.

Before to the 2019 elections, Legarda abruptly registered Antique province as her new hometown, to allow her to run for a district post. Despite facing an election case, the Commission on Elections (Comelec) later allowed her to run as representative of the lone district of Antique, which she won while allying herself with national party of Sara Duterte.

In the 2022 elections, Legarda disallowed all politicians in Antique to welcome vice president Leni Robredo, while mandated the welcoming of Bongbong Marcos and Sara Duterte to Evelio B. Javier Freedom Park, a park dedicated to the late Antique hero Evelio Javier, who was murdered by the dictatorship of Ferdinand Marcos, father of Bongbong Marcos. It was reported that the local politicians in Antique were afraid from countering the likings of Legarda, who was well-connected nationally and has past experience as national budget chair in the Senate.

During the same elections, Legarda run for the Senate and mandated her brother Antonio Agapito “AA” Legarda to run for the lone district of Antique as her replacement, establishing a succession dynasty. The move was criticized, especially after AA Legarda registered his name in the ballot as "Legarda, AA Inday Loren", which made locals thought that it was Loren who was running. This prompted a local to file a case in Comelec to disqualify AA, but the case was junked, leading to AA's election victory. Both Loren and AA, who grew up in Malabon, do not know how to fluently speak Kinaray-a, the native language of the people of Antique.

In 2025, while Loren remained as senator, her brother AA again run for district representative of the lone district of Antique against Antique Gov. Rhodora Cadiao. Legarda and Cadiao were allies, but Legarda betrayed her in favor of her brother AA. Her son, college-dropout Leandro Leviste, also run for a district representative post in Batangas, the home province of Legarda's ex-husband who was convicted for homicide. Both AA and Leandro won. The move expanded Legarda's dynasty into two separate provinces.

In 2026, amid plunder and graft investigations on Legarda and her son who both flew out of the country, the collective youth organizations of Antique condemned the senator, stating that while Legarda used her stint as Antique’s lone district representative from 2019 to 2022 to brand herself as a local benefactor, the province "continues to suffer from basic systemic crises" such as "rotational power outages, unreliable utility grids, and persistent economic inequality". The collective also rejected Legarda's plans that intended Antique to become a political sanctuary or an electoral stepping stone for national dynasties. They added that "token cultural patronage, photo opportunities, and seasonal infrastructure handouts cannot replace structural justice and honest governance." The group also noted Legarda as having "a long career defined by opportunism", and urged the senator and her son to face their plunder and graft cases.

== Organizational affiliations ==
- Commissioner, Global Commission on Adaptation (2018)

== Accolades ==
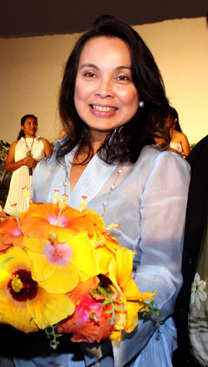
Legarda after being awarded by the University of the Philippines, the country's premier educational institution.

- 1992 Ten Outstanding Young Men (TOYM) from the Philippine Jaycees
- 1995 The Outstanding Women in the Nation's Service (TOWNS) Award
- 1995 Benigno Aquino Award for Journalism
- 2000 Global Leaders for Tomorrow by the World Economic Forum
- 2001 UNEP Laureate by the United Nations Environment Programme
- 2001 Global 500 Roll of Honor by the United Nations Environment Programme
- 2004 Awardee for the Environment by the Priyadarshni Academy in Mumbai, India
- 2008 Regional Champion for Disaster Risk Reduction and Climate Change Adaption for Asia and the Pacific by the United Nations International Strategy for Disaster Reduction
- "Bai a labi" (Honorary Muslim Princess) by the Marawi Sultanate League
- "Tukwifi" (Bright Star) by the Mountain Province Indigenous Peoples
- "Bai Matumpis" (The One Who Takes Care) by the unified congregation of 10 Davao indigenous people groups
- "Cuyong Adlaw Dulpa-an Labaw sa Kadunggan" (Shining Sun Rising in Power) by the Suludnon Indigenous Peoples of Panay
- 2013 Distinguished Alumna for Environmental Protection and Climate Change Adaptation of the University of the Philippines
- 2015 Global Champion for Resilience by the United Nations International Strategy for Disaster Reduction
- Chevalier (Knight) in the Ordre national de la légion d’Honneur (National Order of the French Legion of Honor)
- Cavaliere (Knight) of the Italian Order of Merit
- 2016 Dangal ng Haraya Patron of Arts and Culture by the National Commission for Culture and the Arts
- 2017 National Adaptation Plan (NAP) Champion by the United Nations Framework Convention on Climate Change
- 2018 Honorary degree of Doctor of Laws, Honoris Causa by the University of the Philippines
- 2019 Award of Distinction by the European Union
- 2023 “Commendatore” to the Order of Merit of the Italian Republic

Additionally, Legarda has garnered more than 30 awards on the field of journalism since the 1980s.

== Personal life ==
Legarda met former Batangas Governor Antonio Leviste at the latter's family-owned Matabungkay Beach Club in the 1980s, with the two marrying in 1989. Their marriage produced two sons: Lorenzo Antonio "Lanz" Leviste (born 1990) and Leandro Antonio Leviste (born 1993); in March 2002, Legarda suffered a miscarriage with their eight-week-old third baby. In 2001, Legarda and Leviste began living separately from each other, with Legarda taking custody of their children. In November 2002, the surname "Leviste" was dropped from Legarda's name in the Senate, and by 2008, their marriage was annulled. Leviste was later convicted of homicide in 2009.

Legarda's eldest son, Lorenzo, disowned his mother in 2022 after Legarda supported the 2022 run of presidential candidate Bongbong Marcos, son of dictator Ferdinand Marcos, and his vice presidential candidate Sara Duterte, daughter of then-president Rodrigo Duterte. Her youngest son, Leandro, is the founder and president of Solar Philippines and is embroiled in a plunder and graft controversy together with Legarda.

Legarda is a Colonel in the Philippine Air Force Reserve Corps. The Marawi Sultanate League bestowed the honorary title of "Bai Alabi" ("Princess") on her. She established the Luntiang Pilipinas (Green Philippines) foundation.

== Electoral history ==
Electoral history of Loren Legarda
Year	Office	Party	Votes received				Result
Year	Office	Party	Total	%	P.	Swing	Result
1998	Senator of the Philippines	Lakas–NUCD	14,933,965	50.99%	1st	—N/a	Won
2007	Senator of the Philippines	NPC	18,501,734	62.72%	1st	+11.73	Won
2013	Senator of the Philippines	NPC	18,661,196	46.49%	2nd	-16.23	Won
2022	Senator of the Philippines	NPC	24,264,969	43.68%	2nd	-2.81	Won
2004	Vice President of the Philippines	KNP	14,218,709	46.89%	2nd	—N/a	Lost
2010	Vice President of the Philippines	NPC	4,294,664	12.21%	3rd	-34.68	Lost
2019	Representative (Antique)	NPC	199,187	66.43%	1st	—N/a	Won

Senate of the Philippines
Preceded by Francisco Tatad	Majority leader of the Senate of the Philippines; 2001–2002	Succeeded by Aquilino Pimentel Jr.
Preceded by Aquilino Pimentel Jr.	Majority leader of the Senate of the Philippines; 2002–2004	Succeeded by Francis Pangilinan
Preceded by Migz Zubiri (Acting)	President pro tempore of the Senate of the Philippines; 2022–present	Succeeded by Jinggoy Estrada
House of Representatives of the Philippines
Preceded by Paolo Javier	Representative, Lone District of Antique; 2019–2022	Succeeded by Antonio Agapito Legarda Jr.
