= Solar Philippines =

Solar energy company based in the Philippines

- Type: Holding company
- Industry: Energy
- Founded: 2013; 13 years ago
- Founder: Leandro Leviste
- Headquarters: Makati, Philippines
- Products: Solar energy
- Website: www.solarphilippines.ph

Solar Philippines Power Project Holdings, Inc., or simply Solar Philippines, is a solar energy company based in the Philippines.

== History ==
Solar Philippines was established in 2013 by Leandro Leviste. The company started small-scale, providing rooftop installment of solar panels it imported from China to clients. Its first project was the installment of solar panels at Central Mall in Biñan, Laguna. It also provided the rooftop solar panels of SM City North Edsa in Quezon City.

The company in 2016, was able to secure a subsidy from the Department of Energy enabling it to set up the Calatagan Solar Farm. This was followed by photovoltaic power stations in Batangas, Nueva Ecija and Tarlac.

A subsidiary, the Solar Philippines Nueva Ecija Corp. (SPNEC), which is intended to operate the Nueva Ecija Solar Farm as the world's largest solar farm was listed in the Philippine Stock Exchange in December 2021 SPNEC was renamed as SP New Energy Corp. in 2022. SPNEC began construction of the solar farm in 2021.

SPNEC's Manuel Pangilinan announced in March 2024 plans to sell 40% of the equity in Terra Solar Philippines Inc. to get more investors to build a P200-billion cache. "The investment [for the project] would be at Terra Solar, which is 100 percent owned by SPNEC. Most likely, foreign investors will come in for an up to 40-percent equity stake at the Terra Solar level," Pangilinan said.

Between 2023 and 2024, Solar Philippines shifted away from independent control. Founder Leandro Leviste reduced his stake in several key entities, including Solar Philippines Nueva Ecija Corp. (SPNEC), via share swaps and asset transfers. Although presented as growth moves, these steps gave Metro Pacific Investments Corporation (MPIC)—backed MERALCO—greater control over many of the solar assets that Leviste had developed.

By mid‑2024, analysts noted that a significant portion of Solar Philippines’ operating capacity was managed by Meralco‑linked firms. While the brand remained - its challenger role faded. Some argue that merging into large utilities reduced its original goal of expanding solar access. That marks a clear diversion from its mission to independently build solar farms to compete with fossil fuels. The asset portfolio that defined the company now belongs to the renewable holdings of established conglomerates.

Countryside Investment Holdings Corporation, in partnership with SPPPH, Inc is funding P5 billion to transform Batangas into a dynamic landscape for trade and energy. This "strategic move" is supposed to benefit 13,000 farmers and sugar mill workers who were displaced by the closure of Central Azucarera Don Pedro sugar mill in Nasugbu.

== Controversies and regulatory penalties ==
=== Department of Energy penalties and DOJ complaint ===
In early 2026, the Philippine Department of Energy (DOE) imposed approximately ₱24 billion in penalties against Solar Philippines Power Project Holdings, Inc. for failing to meet its renewable energy commitments. The DOE terminated 33 of the company's service contracts awarded under the Green Energy Auction Program (GEAP) and other agreements, citing willful neglect and non-compliance with agreed-upon timelines. Following the cancellations, Energy Secretary Sharon Garin filed a complaint with the Department of Justice (DOJ) in May 2026 against Solar Philippines founder and Batangas Representative Leandro Leviste, alleging violations of the Public Service Act. Garin noted that despite having "no single project or operation" continuously running, the company continuously profited through its umbrella organizations, effectively holding "ghost contracts" that failed to reach the groundbreaking stage.

=== Plunder, graft, and conflict of interest allegations ===
The company's legislative franchise, granted in 2019, has been the subject of intense scrutiny regarding political favoritism and conflict of interest involving Leviste and his mother, Senator Loren Legarda. In January 2026, former Buhay Party-List Representative Lito Atienza alleged that Legarda, who was then the chair of the Philippine Senate Committee on Finance, utilized her appropriations power to pressure lawmakers into approving her son's solar franchise. Atienza also questioned the sudden inflation of the company's capitalization, noting that after he pointed out Leviste only had ₱1 million in capital, the amount was allegedly changed overnight to ₱1 billion, raising suspicions about the source of the funds.

Atienza claimed that Leviste's true intent was to sell off the franchise for profit rather than electrify remote communities, prompting Atienza to insert an ipso facto clause that would void the franchise if it were sold or transferred. Despite this clause, it was revealed in late 2025 and early 2026 that Leviste initiated block sales and share swaps—totaling over ₱20 billion—to transfer a controlling interest of the company's projects, including SP New Energy Corp. (SPNEC), to Meralco's MGreen and other investors. Critics argue this bypassed mandatory legislative review and violated the franchise's ownership rules.

While early ethics and conflict-of-interest complaints filed in 2018 and 2019 were largely ignored, the controversies culminated in severe legal action in 2026. On July 31, 2026, Ombudsman Jesus Crispin Remulla announced a preliminary investigation into both Leandro Leviste and Senator Loren Legarda for alleged plunder and graft—non-bailable offenses—involving ₱10 billion in anomalous solar projects. Remulla criticized the exclusivity of the contracts that failed to deliver, referring to the company's output as "ghost electricity."

== Solar farms ==
- Calatagan Solar Farm – Calatagan, Batangas
- Tarlac Solar Farm – Concepcion, Tarlac
- Nueva Ecija Solar Farm – Peñaranda, Nueva Ecija
