= Antonio Leviste =

Filipino politician and businessman

Tony Leviste

18th Governor of Batangas
- In office February 17, 1972 – March 2, 1980
- Preceded by: Antonio Carpio
- Succeeded by: Jose C. Laurel V

Vice Governor of Batangas
- In office January 1, 1972 – February 17, 1972
- Governor: Antonio Carpio
- Preceded by: Antonio Carpio

Personal details
- Born: Jose Antonio Casals Leviste; January 16, 1940 (age 86) Malabon, Rizal, Philippine Commonwealth
- Party: Lakas (1993–present)
- Other political affiliations: PRP (1991–1993); KBL (1978–1980)
- Spouses: Celia Sarangaya; Loren Legarda (m. 1989; ann. 2008)
- Children: 5 (inc. Toni and Leandro)
- Relatives: Mark Leviste (nephew)
- Education: Lyceum of the Philippines
- Occupation: Politician
- Profession: Businessman

Jose Antonio "Tony" Casals Leviste (born January 16, 1940) is a Filipino politician and businessman, who served as Governor of Batangas from 1972 to 1980. Born to a distinguished Batangueño family renowned in both business and politics, he was married to Senator Loren Legarda, but later separated from her before the 2004 elections. Leviste is the father of equestrian Toni Leviste and businessman-turned-politician Leandro Leviste.

In 2009, Leviste was sentenced to six years in prison for the 2007 murder of his aide Rafael de las Alas. Leviste served his sentence at the New Bilibid Prison in Muntinlupa and on December 6, 2013, he was released after his parole was granted.

== Career ==
Leviste graduated from the Lyceum of the Philippines in 1959 and became the president of the Batangas Varsitarian, a reputable campus organization for students hails from different provinces. During his term as Governor of Batangas, he was elected member of the Batasang Bayan chairman of the Regional Development Council, Vice President of the League of Governors and City Mayors, and chairman of the Program for Forest Ecosystem management.

Leviste was an advocate of the environment. He initiated a forest ecosystem management program which today continues to be a model in reforestation that made him earn the coveted "Ten Outstanding Young Men of the Philippines" (TOYM) award for Public Administration in 1973.

Leviste was chosen the "Realtor of the Year" by the Business Writers Association of the Philippines. He served as the director in various government agencies, including the People's Homesite and Housing Corporation (now the NHA), Philippine Ports Authority, Philippine Aerospace Development Corporation, Semirara Mining Corporation and the Philippine Tourism Authority. He was co-founder of the Pasay Board of Realtors and the Philippine Association of Real Estate Boards. He also served as Chairman of the Philippine Leisure and Retirement Authority (now the PRA) in the early 2000s. He holds the rank of Lt. Commander in the Philippine Navy Reserve Force and is the Honorary Consul General of the State of Palestine.

In late 1991, Leviste joined Miriam Defensor Santiago's newly established People's Reform Party as its secretary general, where he was also made its leading senatorial candidate for the 1992 election. However, Leviste and the other PRP senatorial candidates failed to win seats in the election.

Currently, he is the charter president of the Resort Association of the Philippines and co-founder of the Tourism Council of the Philippines. He is the chief executive officer of the Leviste Group of Companies, a real estate firm engaged in housing, subdivision, condominium and resort development.

== Personal life ==
Leviste met Loren Legarda at his family-owned Matabungkay Beach Club in the 1980s, after having seen her as a reporter on television. The two married in 1989, and had two children: Lorenzo Antonio (born 1990) and Leandro Antonio (born 1993); in March 2002, Legarda suffered a miscarriage with their eight-week-old third baby. Since 2001, Leviste and Legarda were living separately from each other, with the latter taking custody of their children. In November 2002, the surname "Leviste" was dropped from Legarda's name in the Senate, and by 2008, their marriage was annulled.

During an international road show organized by the Department of Tourism in 2002, Leviste joined tourism secretary Richard Gordon in hosting the event, where the former was noted to have performed magic tricks.

=== Homicide conviction ===
On January 14, 2009, Leviste was convicted of homicide in the killing of his longtime friend and aide, 68-year-old Rafael de las Alas, who had died from four gunshot wounds in Leviste's office at the LPL Building in Makati on January 12, 2007. Leviste had admitted responsibility for de las Alas' death, asserting he only fired in self-defence. The Makati Regional Trial Court sentenced him to six to twelve years in prison. Leviste served his sentence at the National Bilibid Prison in Muntinlupa and was released on December 6, 2013, after his parole was granted following six years in prison.
