= Antonio Legarda Jr. =

Filipino politician (born 1968)

Antonio Agapito Legarda Jr.
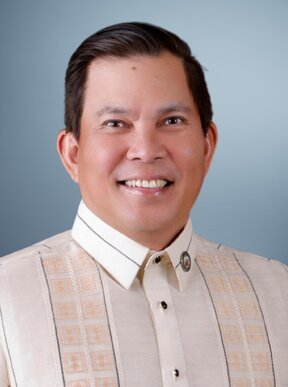
- Official portrait, 2025

Member of the Philippine House of Representatives from Antique's Lone District
- Incumbent
- Assumed office June 30, 2022
- Preceded by: Loren Legarda

Personal details
- Born: December 8, 1968 (age 57) Manila, Philippines
- Citizenship: Philippines
- Party: Nationalist People's Coalition
- Spouse: Jennifer Nicolas
- Relatives: Loren Legarda (sister); Leandro Leviste (nephew)
- Education: University of the Philippines Diliman (BA)
- Occupation: Politician
- Nickname: AA

Antonio Agapito "AA" Bautista Legarda Jr. (born December 8, 1968) is a Filipino politician. He currently serves as a member of the Philippine House of Representatives representing Antique's at-large congressional district.

He is the younger brother of Senator and former Antique Congresswoman Loren Legarda. He is also the uncle of Batangas congressman Leandro Leviste.

== Early life ==
Legarda was born in Manila to parents Antonio Cabrera Legarda and Maria Salome Basilia "Bessie" Gella Bautista. His maternal grandfather was Jose P. Bautista, editor-in-chief of the pre-Martial Law newspaper, The Manila Times, while his maternal grandmother was Carmen Gella Bautista of Pandan, Antique. Legarda's maternal great-grandfather, Ariston Rendon Gella, was a member of the Malolos Congress that crafted the Philippine Constitution of the First Philippine Republic. His great-granduncle Vicente Gella was governor of the province while his great-granduncle was mayor of Sibalom. A brother of his grandfather, Bartolome Gella, also served as governor of Antique.

== Electoral history ==
Electoral history of Antonio Legarda Jr.
Year	Office	Party	Votes received				Result
Year	Office	Party	Total	%	P.	Swing	Result
2022	Representative (Antique)	NPC	189,907	56.15%	1st	—N/a	Won
2025	Representative (Antique)	NPC	209,083	63.23%	1st	+7.08	Won

House of Representatives of the Philippines
Preceded by Loren Legarda	Representative, Lone District of Antique; 2025–present	Incumbent
