= Luntiang Pilipinas =

- Chairman: Loren Legarda
- Founded: 1998; 28 years ago
- Headquarters: Quezon City
- Colors: Green
- Slogan: Ligtas ang Bukas, sa Luntiang Pilipinas (lit. Tomorrow is safe in Green Philippines)

Luntiang Pilipinas is a national urban forestry program in the Philippines, founded by Senator Loren Legarda in the year 1998, committed to promote environmental protection and awareness among Filipinos.

== Participation in the 2019 elections ==
In order to run for party-list in the 2019 party-list elections, Luntiang Pilipinas submitted a Certificate of Nomination and Acceptance on October 16, 2018. The party-list group nominated Harry Roque, a former presidential spokesperson, and Ciara Sotto, a musician and actress. Later, Roque would withdraw from the contest to run for Senator, and Michael Lim Ubac, a former journalist for the Philippine Daily Inquirer, took his place. Legarda would have been one among the nominees for the party-list, but she declared her intention to run for congress in Antique. Luntiang Pilipinas only received 59,096 votes, falling short of the required percentage to get at least one seat in the House of Representatives.
