= Philippine Senate Committee on Finance =

Standing committee of the Senate of the Philippines

Committee on Finance
- Senate of the Philippines; 20th Congress

History
- New session started: July 28, 2025

Leadership
- Chair: JV Ejercito (NPC) since June 3, 2026

Structure
- Seats: 20
- Political groups: Majority (11): NPC (3); Akbayan (1); KANP (1); Lakas (1); Liberal (1); Nacionalista (1); Independent (3); Minority (9): PDP (3); Nacionalista (3); NPC (1); PMP (1); Independent (1)

The Philippine Senate Committee on Finance is a standing committee of the Senate of the Philippines.

== Jurisdiction ==
According to the Rules of the Senate, the committee handles all matters relating to:

- Funds for the expenditures of the national government and for the payment of public indebtedness
- Auditing of accounts and expenditures of the national government
- Claims against the government
- Inter-governmental revenue sharing
- In general, all matters relating to public expenditures

== Members, 20th Congress ==
Based on the Rules of the Senate, the Senate Committee on Finance has 20 members.

The Finance Committee is further split into subcommittees, 10 in total as of the 20th Congress, each headed by the committee chairperson or a committee vice chairperson.

Position	Member	Party	Subcommittee Chaired
Chairperson	JV Ejercito (Note: Also serving as the deputy majority leader.)	NPC	Subcommittee A
Vice Chairpersons	Bam Aquino	KANP	Subcommittee B
Vice Chairpersons	Pia Cayetano	Nacionalista	Subcommittee C
Vice Chairpersons	Bong Go	PDP	Subcommittee D
Vice Chairpersons	Risa Hontiveros	Akbayan	Subcommittee E
Vice Chairpersons	Loren Legarda (Note: Currently on medical leave)	NPC	Subcommittee F
Vice Chairpersons	Kiko Pangilinan	Liberal	Subcommittee G
Vice Chairpersons	Erwin Tulfo	Lakas	Subcommittee H
Vice Chairpersons	Joel Villanueva	Independent	Subcommittee I
Vice Chairpersons	Panfilo Lacson	Independent	Subcommittee J
Members for the Majority	Francis Escudero	NPC	-
Members for the Majority	Lito Lapid	NPC	-
Members for the Majority	Raffy Tulfo	Independent	-
Members for the Majority	Mark Villar	Nacionalista	-
Members for the Minority	Ronald dela Rosa (Note: Currently a fugitive)	PDP	-
Members for the Minority	Jinggoy Estrada (Note: Currently detained)	PMP	-
Members for the Minority	Rodante Marcoleta	Independent	-
Members for the Minority	Imee Marcos (Note: Also serving as deputy minority leader.)	Nacionalista	-
Members for the Minority	Robin Padilla	PDP	-
Members for the Minority	Camille Villar	Nacionalista	-

Ex officio members:

- Senate President pro tempore Tito Sotto
- Majority Floor Leader Juan Miguel Zubiri
- Minority Floor Leader Alan Peter Cayetano

Committee secretaries:

- Main committee: Dir. Gen. Eileen R. Palanca / Hazel Ross P. Villarba
- Subcommittee A: Hazel Ross P. Villarba
- Subcommittee B: Norliza R. Villanueva
- Subcommittee C: Beatrice Ann M. Vidamo
- Subcommittee D: Grace Ann C. Salesa
- Subcommittee E: Arthur Lawrence L. Acierto
- Subcommittee F: Jovy Anne Querubin-Fernandez
- Subcommittee G: Horace R. Cruda
- Subcommittee H: Lyka Ranelle dela Cruz-Yap
- Subcommittee I: Dir. Putli Suharni S. Candao
- Subcommittee J: Philip M. Lina
- Subcommittee K: Maria Clarinda R. Mendoza
- Subcommittee L: Eloisa R. Tecson

== Historical membership rosters ==
=== 19th Congress ===
The subcommittee headed by the chairperson or a vice chairperson is also indicated:

Position	Member	Party	Subcommittee Chaired
Chairperson	Grace Poe	Independent	Subcommittee A
Vice Chairpersons	Cynthia Villar	Nacionalista	Subcommittee B
Vice Chairpersons	Ronald dela Rosa	PDP–Laban	Subcommittee C
Vice Chairpersons	Pia Cayetano	Nacionalista	Subcommittee D
Vice Chairpersons	Win Gatchalian	NPC	Subcommittee E
Vice Chairpersons	Bong Go	PDP–Laban	Subcommittee F
Vice Chairpersons	Loren Legarda	NPC	Subcommittee G
Vice Chairpersons	Risa Hontiveros (Note: Also served as the only member for the minority.)	Akbayan	Subcommittee H
Vice Chairpersons	Imee Marcos	Nacionalista	Subcommittee I
Vice Chairpersons	Joel Villanueva	Independent	Subcommittee J
Vice Chairpersons	Juan Miguel Zubiri	Independent	Subcommittee K
Vice Chairpersons	Francis Tolentino	PDP–Laban	Subcommittee L
Vice Chairpersons	Mark Villar	Nacionalista	Subcommittee M
Vice Chairpersons	JV Ejercito	NPC	Subcommittee N
Vice Chairpersons	Jinggoy Estrada	PMP	Subcommittee O
Members for the Majority	Nancy Binay	UNA	-
Members for the Majority	Alan Peter Cayetano	Independent	-
Members for the Majority	Lito Lapid	NPC	-
Members for the Majority	Robin Padilla	PDP–Laban	-
Members for the Majority	Bong Revilla	Lakas	-
Members for the Majority	Raffy Tulfo	Independent	-

Committee secretaries:

- Main committee: Eileen R. Palanca / Beatrice Anne M. Vidamo
- Subcommittee A: Beatrice Anne M. Vidamo
- Subcommittee B: Philip M. Lina
- Subcommittee C: Arthur Lawrence L. Acierto
- Subcommittee D/N: Cleah D. Nava
- Subcommittee E: Hazel Ross P. Villarba
- Subcommittee F: Horace R. Cruda
- Subcommittee G: Joey M. Tunac
- Subcommittee H: Gemma Genoveva G. Tanpiengco
- Subcommittee I: Elizabeth F. Agas
- Subcommittee J: Bernadine B. Mahinay
- Subcommittee K: Jamie Lyn Duque-Daileg
- Subcommittee L: Andrè B. Mortel
- Subcommittee M: Sherwynne B. Agub
- Subcommittee O: Norliza Villanueva

=== 18th Congress ===
Position	Member	Party	Subcommittee Chaired
Chairperson	Sonny Angara	LDP	Subcommittee A
Vice Chairpersons	Pia Cayetano	Nacionalista	Subcommittee D
Vice Chairpersons	Cynthia Villar	Nacionalista	Subcommittee B
Vice Chairpersons	Panfilo Lacson	Independent	Subcommittee C
Vice Chairpersons	Joel Villanueva	CIBAC	Subcommittee J
Vice Chairpersons	Win Gatchalian	NPC	Subcommittee E
Vice Chairpersons	Richard Gordon	Independent	Subcommittee G
Vice Chairpersons	Bong Go	PDP–Laban	Subcommittee F
Vice Chairpersons	Imee Marcos	Nacionalista	Subcommittee I
Vice Chairpersons	Risa Hontiveros	Akbayan	Subcommittee H
Vice Chairpersons	Grace Poe	Independent	Subcommittee K
Members for the Majority	Nancy Binay	UNA	-
Members for the Majority	Ronald dela Rosa	PDP–Laban	-
Members for the Majority	Lito Lapid	NPC	-
Members for the Majority	Manny Pacquiao	PDP–Laban	-
Members for the Majority	Aquilino Pimentel III	PDP–Laban	-
Members for the Majority	Bong Revilla	Lakas	-
Members for the Majority	Francis Tolentino	PDP–Laban	-
Members for the Minority	Leila de Lima	Liberal	-
Members for the Minority	Francis Pangilinan	Liberal	-

Committee secretaries:

- Main committee: Niniveh B. Lao / Arturo I. Mojica / Legislative Budget Research and Monitoring Office
- Subcommittee A: Niniveh B. Lao / Arturo I. Mojica
- Subcommittee B: Philip M. Lina / Maria Clarinda R. Mendoza
- Subcommittee C: Charlyne Claire Fuentes-Olay
- Subcommittee D: Ma. Lourdes A. Juan-Alzate
- Subcommittee E: Elizabeth F. Agas
- Subcommittee F: Horace R. Cruda
- Subcommittee G: Jose Marcos Babia
- Subcommittee H: Maria Gylissa Love J. Morales
- Subcommittee I: Dana Paula Mendiola-Alberto
- Subcommittee J: Ambrosio M. Manaligod, Jr.
- Subcommittee K: Harold Ian V. Bartolome

== See also ==
- List of Philippine Senate committees
