= Meralco Terra Solar Farm =

Solar power plant in the Philippines

MTerra Solar Farm
- Country: Philippines
- Location: Bulacan and Nueva Ecija
- Coordinates: 15°18′47″N 121°2′17″E
- Status: Under construction
- Construction began: 2024; 2 years ago
- Commission date: 2026 (planned)
- Construction cost: ₱200 billion
- Owner: Meralco PowerGen (MGEN) through Terra Solar Philippines Inc.

Solar farm
- Type: Flat-panel PV
- Site area: 3,500 hectares (8,600 acres)

Power generation
- Nameplate capacity: 3,500 MW (planned)
- Storage capacity: 4,500 MWh

The Meralco Terra (MTerra) Solar Project is a solar power and energy battery storage facility project under construction in the Philippines.

== History ==
=== Initial plans ===
Solar Philippines initially planned to build a 500 MW solar power plant in Peñaranda, Nueva Ecija which was projected to be the largest of its kind in Southeast Asia.

The project for the Nueva Ecija solar farm was first conceptualized in 2016. It would be built in phases with the first phase to produce 225 MW. Construction was planned for late-2021.

Terra Solar, the company was established in 2020 as a joint venture between Prime Infra and Solar Philippines, the parent

=== MTerra Solar project ===
In 2022, Solar Philippines announced its expanding its planned Nueva Ecija facility to include land in Bulacan. Clearing of land for the solar facility began by January 2024.

SPNEC's Manuel Pangilinan announced in March 2024 plans to sell 40% of the equity in Terra Solar Philippines Inc. to get more investors to build a P200-billion cache. "The investment [for the project] would be at Terra Solar, which is 100 percent owned by SPNEC. Most likely, foreign investors will come in for an up to 40-percent equity stake at the Terra Solar level," Pangilinan said.

The solar power initiative was inaugurated as the MTerra Solar Project on November 21, 2024, in Barangay Callos, Peñaranda,Nueva Ecija in a ceremony led by president Bongbong Marcos.

The first phase of the project covering 2,500 MW is expected to be complete by 2026. The second phase by 2027. Energy China is the engineering, procurement, and construction contractor for the project.

== Facility ==
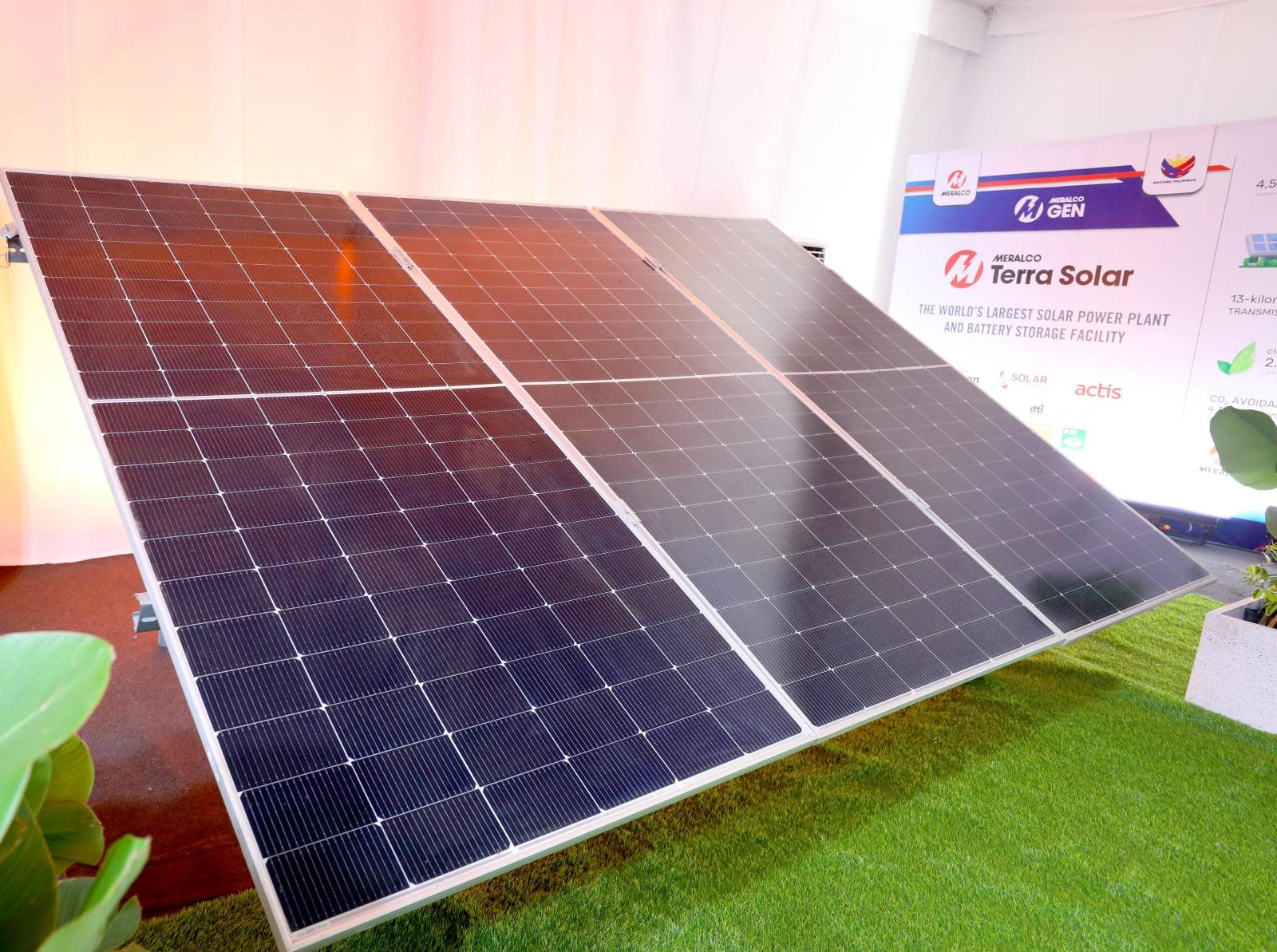
A display of a solar panel at the November 2024 launch of the Terra Solar project.

The Meralco Terra Solar facility will span across an area of 3,500 hectares (8,600 acres) across Gapan, General Tinio, Peñaranda, and San Leonardo in Nueva Ecija and San Miguel in Bulacan.

It will have a production capacity of 3,500 MW as well as a 4,500 MWh Battery Energy Storage System (BESS). It will be connected to the national grid via the 500-kilovolt (kV) Nagsaag–San Jose Transmission Line. Meralco will distribute 850 MW of the power produced to its customers.
