= Calatagan Solar Farm =

MW solar power plant in Calatagan, Batangas

- Country: Philippines
- Location: Calatagan, Batangas
- Coordinates: 13°55′24″N 120°40′12″E
- Status: Operational
- Construction began: March 2015
- Commission date: 2016
- Construction cost: ₱5.7 billion
- Owner: Solar Philippines

Solar farm
- Type: Flat-panel PV

Power generation
- Nameplate capacity: 63.3 MW

External links
- Website: https://www.solarphilippines.ph/

The Calatagan Solar Farm is a 63.3 MW solar power plant in Calatagan, Batangas owned by Solar Philippines.

It was reported that the groundbreaking for the solar facility was done as early as March 2015. Solar Philippines, a local company, developed the project which cost ₱5.7 billion. The facility was built by 2,500 people in a 160 hectares (400 acres) land near the foot of Mount San Piro. Upon its completion, the solar farm has 200,000 panels.

Majority of the funds for the project's cost was shouldered by the Philippine Business Bank. Banco de Oro, China Bank, and the Bank of Commerce also provided funds.

By the end of February, the Calatagan Solar Farm is already generating power weeks before the deadline set by the Department of Energy of March 15, 2016.
