= Metro Pacific Investments =

Philippine conglomerate

Metro Pacific Investments Corporation
- Type: Privately-held holding company
- Founded: March 20, 2006; 20 years ago (SEC Registration No. CS200604494)
- Headquarters: 9th Floor, Tower One, Rockwell Business Center, Ortigas Avenue, Ortigas Center, Brgy. Ugong, 1604, Pasig, Philippines
- Area served: Philippines
- Key people: Manuel V. Pangilinan (Chairman); Alfred V. Ty (Vice Chairman); Jose K. Ma. Lim (President & CEO)
- Revenue: ▲PHP50.88 billion (2022)
- Operating income: ▲PHP18.5 billion (2026H1)
- Net income: ▲PHP16 billion (2026H1)
- Total assets: ▲PHP643.8 billion (2022)
- Total equity: ▲PHP245.04 billion (2022)
- Owner: See ownership
- Parent: First Pacific Company Limited (ultimate); Metro Pacific Holdings, Inc.(immediate)
- Subsidiaries: See subsidiaries
- Website: www.mpic.com.ph

Metro Pacific Investments Corporation (MPIC) is a Philippine unit investment holding company of First Pacific Company Limited through Metro Pacific Holdings, Inc. MPIC through its subsidiaries, provides water, sanitation, and sewerage services and also operates in real estate, and infrastructure projects. It also invests in some hospitals in the Philippines.

== History ==
First Pacific's Philippine investment holding interests other than that of PLDT and Philex Mining were in the distinct, similarly named juridical entity "Metro Pacific Corporation" (MPC, SEC Registration No. 135748) now renamed to "Neo Oracle Holdings, Inc." . This included the creation, master planning and development of Bonifacio Global City before selling out to Ayala Land and Campos groups.

As part of MPC's corporate rehabilitation, recapitalization and reorganization program, MPIC, an entirely new entity was created in March 2006. Through matters such as share swaps, shareholders of MPC became the shareholders of MPIC, and MPC became a subsidiary of MPIC - the Board of Directors and executive management of both ended up being essentially the same as it was before the program. MPIC was intended to emerge as a new, debt-free investment company to continually expand the real estate business of MPC thru Landco, raise new capital from existing and new investors and make new investments in infrastructure amongst others. MPIC thereafter directly owned a majority of Landco and of MPC. The stake in Landco was however reduced to below 40% in 2009, to help raise capital for the prioritized ventures in power, telecommunications and tollway businesses. MPIC did eventually buy back all of the shares so that LandCo again became a wholly-owned subsidiary, around 12 years later.

MPC, which became Neo Oracle, continued to exist as an unlisted corporate entity (used to own certain other assets that were eventually divested off) as of 2020. However, a routine check in September 2026 yields that its registration is "Expired".

In May 2016, over ten years later after MPIC's incorporation, GT Capital Holdings Inc. (GTCAP, parent of Metropolitan Bank and Trust Company among other business of the Ty family), acquired 15.6 percent of MPIC, which will, in turn, buy control over GTCAP's Global Business Power Corporation in a deal worth PHP 29.89 billion. GTCAP acquired 3.6 billion new common shares in MPIC at PHP 6.10 per share amounting to a stake of 11.4 percent on an expanded capital base for a total cash consideration of PHP 21.96 billion. It also acquired a further 1.3 billion common shares in MPIC from Metro Pacific Holdings, Inc. (MPHI), MPIC immediate parent company and a Philippine affiliate of First Pacific, at the same price, for a total of PHP 7.93 billion in cash. These transactions resulted in GTCAP holding an overall stake of 15.6 percent of the common share capital of MPIC in a new business alliance between the two business groups.

As initially hinted at on late April 2023, the company formally filed in August 2023 for voluntary delisting from the Philippine Stock Exchange (PSE). The company completed its tender offer on September 19, acquiring 5.46 billion common shares equivalent to 19% of the company and was eventually delisted effective October 9. Eight days later on October 17, Ramon S. Ang was elected a member of the company's board of directors after making a direct investment in MPIC. However, the size of Ang's investment was not disclosed.

== Subsidiaries ==
=== Water ===
- Maynilad Water Holding Company Inc.
  - Maynilad Water Services - 83.96% controlling stake
- Metropac Water Investments Corporation
  - Manila Water Consortium Inc.
    - Cebu Manila Water Development Inc.
  - Tuan Loc Water Resources Investment Joint Stock Company (Vietnam) - 49%
  - Metro Pacific Iloilo Water (MPIW)

=== Power ===
- Manila Electric Company (MERALCO) - holds 12.5% direct stake
  - Radius Telecoms, Inc. - 100% owned
  - SP New Energy Corp.
- Beacon Electric Asset Holdings Inc. (BEACON)
  - Manila Electric Company (MERALCO) - 35% stake (as of 2017)
  - San Miguel Global Business Power (GBP) - 56% (as of 2017)
- MetPower Venture Partners Holdings, Inc. (Waste to energy)

BEACON is a special purpose company formed in early 2010 by the consortium of sister company PLDT and PLDT Communication and Energy Ventures (formerly Piltel, itself owned by PLDT) whose sole purpose is to hold the group's shares in MERALCO. On May 30, 2016, Bloomberg reported that PLDT would sell its shares in Beacon to MPIC in order to fund the jont-venture with Globe to acquire the 700 MHz spectrum from San Miguel Corporation. It indeed did that the next year.

=== Infrastructure / Transport ===
- MPIC Infrastructure Holdings Limited (BVI)
- Metro Pacific Tollways Corporation
  - NLEX Corporation
    - North Luzon Expressway
    - NLEX Harbor Link
    - NLEX Connector
    - Subic–Clark–Tarlac Expressway
    - Easytrip Services Corporation
  - MPT South
    - Cavitex Infrastructure Corp.
      - Manila–Cavite Expressway
    - Cavite–Laguna Expressway
  - Cebu–Cordova Link Expressway
- Metro Pacific Light Rail Corp.
  - Light Rail Manila Corporation - a joint venture railway company with Ayala Corporation along with Macquarie Infrastructure and Sumitomo Corporation, that operates the Manila Line 1 under a 32-year concession agreement with the Light Rail Transit Authority

=== Logistics ===
- MetroPac Logistics Company, Inc.
  - Metropac Movers, Inc. (MMI)

=== Healthcare ===
- Metro Pacific Hospital Holdings, Inc. (MPHHI) - holds 43.1% stake and management control
  - Luzon
    - East Manila Hospital Managers Corporation (EMHMC)
      - Our Lady of Lourdes Hospital, Manila (20-year lease through EMHMC)
    - Asian Hospital and Medical Center, Muntinlupa (86% stake)
    - Colinas Verdes Hospital Managers Corporation (CVHMC)
      - Cardinal Santos Medical Center, San Juan
    - Medical Doctors Inc.
      - Makati Medical Center (33% stake), Makati
    - Sacred Heart Hospital of Malolos (51% stake), Malolos City, Bulacan
    - Manila Doctors Hospital (20% stake), Manila
    - Marikina Valley Medical Center (93% stake)
    - De Los Santos Medical Center (51% stake), Quezon City
    - Delgado Memorial Hospital (65% stake), Quezon City
    - Central Luzon Doctors Hospital, Tarlac City
    - UHBI-Parañaque Doctors Hospital
    - Los Baños Doctors Hospital and Medical Center
    - Diliman Doctors Hospital, Inc. (DDHI)
    - City of General Trias Doctors Medical Center Inc. (Gentri Docs)
  - Visayas
    - The Riverside Medical Center Inc., Bacolod
    - Ramiro Community Hospital, Tagbilaran
  - Mindanao
    - Davao Doctors Hospital Inc. (“DDH”)
      - Davao Doctors Hospital (34% stake)
    - West Metro Medical Center, Zamboanga City
    - St. Elizabeth Hospital, General Santos City (80% stake)
    - Manuel J. Santos Hospital, Butuan
    - San Francisco Doctors Hospital, Inc. (SFDH), Agusan del Sur
- Metro Pacific Health Tech Corporation
  - In July 2021, MPIC launched its first high-performance mobile app, called mWell PH.

=== Food and Beverage ===
- Metro Pacific Agro Ventures, Inc.
  - The Laguna Creamery Inc. (Carmen's Best Ice Cream - 51% stake)
    - Carmen's Best Dairy Products, Inc.
    - Carmen's Best International Dairy Co. Inc.
    - Real Fresh Dairy Farms Inc.
  - Axelum Resources Corp (34.8%)
  - Universal Harvester Dairy Farms Incorporated (UHDFI) - Bukidnon Milk Company
- Metro Pacific Coconut Holdings Corporation
  - Franklin Baker Group of Companies

=== Real Estate ===
- Landco Pacific Corporation
- Metro Vantage Properties, Inc.

=== Finance ===
- Maya Bank

=== Education ===
- Davao Doctors College, Davao City
- Riverside College (Philippines), Bacolod City

=== Others ===
- Viva Communications (2.89%)
- IdeaSpace Foundation (QBO Philippines - startup incubator based in Makati City)
- Metro Pacific Resource Recovery Corporation
- MetroPac Apollo Holding, Inc.
- Fragrant Cedar Holdings, Inc.

== Ownership ==
As filed on August 07, 2026, updated legal ownership shareholding structure with Foreign Percentage at 11.3566% ( maximum 40% ):

Major Shareholder	% of Total*	Common Shares	Preferred Shares* Class A	Preferred Shares* Class B
Metro Pacific Holdings, Inc.	58.3382%	29,197,299	18,256,210	-
GT Capital Holdings Inc.	14.1132%	11,479,998	-	-
Mit-Pacific Infrastructure Holdings Corporation***	11.2548%	9,154,895	-	-
Government Service Insurance System	8.9649%	7,292,228	-	-
MIG Holdings, Inc.^	5.5097%	4,481,689	-	-
Social Security System	1.0846%	882,213	-	-
Social Security System Assigned to Employees' Compensation Fund	0.2971%	241,639	-	-
Social Security System Assigned to Mandatory Provident Fund	0.2204%	179,246	-	-
HSBC OBO A/C 000-436550-550***	0.0515%	41,865	-	-
PCD NOMINEE CORP. (FILIPINO)**	0.0380%	30,940	-	-
HSBC OBO A/C 000-596551-550***	0.0298%	24,232	-	-
SCB OBO OMNIBUS BSRD ACCOUNT FAO 041676100001***	0.0111%	9,056	-	-
SCB OBO BNYM AS AGT CLTS NON TREATY FAO 1357157000011***	0.0094%	7,651	-	-
SOCORRO P. LIM	0.0055%	4,443	-	-
STENIEL CAVITE PACKAGING CORPORATION	0.0037%	3,000	-	-
LAMITEK SYSTEMS INCORPORATED	0.0037%	3,000	-	-
NIXON YU AND/OR JULIE C. LIM	0.0037%	3,000	-	-
GREENKFRAFT CORPORATION	0.0037%	3,000	-	-
STENIEL MANUFACTURING CORPORATION	0.0037%	3,000	-	-
GREENSTONE PACKAGING CORPORATION	0.0037%	3,000	-	-
OTHERS	0.0498%	40,492	-	-
Total Authorized (Par)	119,700,000 (₱40,050,000,000)	77,000,000 (₱500)	40,000,000 (₱5.00)	2,700,000 (₱500)
Total Outstanding & Subscribed	81,342,096 (₱31,634,224,050.00)	63,085,886 (₱31,542,943,000.00)	18,256,210 (₱91,281,050.00)	- (₱-)
Total Voting Equity*	81,342,096 (100%)	63,085,886 (77.56%)	18,256,210 (22.44%)	- (0%)

* In Gamboa v. Finance Secretary Teves (G.R. No. 176579 | June 28, 2011) and affirmed in Roy vs. Herbosa (G.R. No. 207246, April 18, 2017), the Supreme Court of the Philippines ruled that under Section 11, Article XII of the Constitution, “capital” in a public utility refers only to shares entitled to vote in the election of directors. Thus, Preferred shares that have been vested with such power are included in the relevant computations, in addition to common shares that naturally are appurtenant with voting privileges in every aspect. As it is a major shareholder in at least one public utility business, MPIC itself even if it's just a holding company, could be subject to the relevant restrictions.
** While the Philippine Central Depository (PCD) is listed a major shareholder, it is more of a trustee-nominee for all shares lodged in the PCD system rather than a single owner/shareholder. Major legal owner shareholders (i.e. those who have at least 5% of outstanding capital stock with voting rights) hidden, if any, under the PCD system are checked/identified and are disclosed with the Definitive Information Statement companies are submitting annually to the local bourse and Securities and Exchange Commission
*** Foreigners (Non-Filipino citizens)
^ Owned by MV Pangilinan

== Divestments ==
- Steniel Manufacturing Corporation (PSE:STN)
- Metro Rail Transit Corporation
- Prime Media Holdings / First e-Bank (sold to BDO Unibank)
- Manila North Harbor, Inc.
- Negros Navigation (entered 1998, exited 2006)
