= Sacred Heart of Jesus Catholic School =

Roman Catholic school in Manila, Philippines

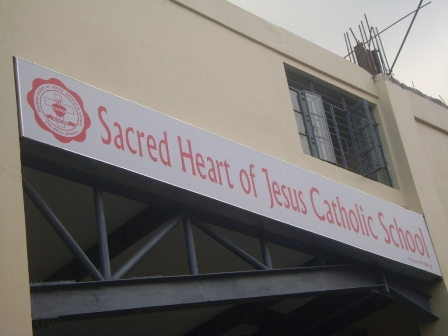

Location
- Santa Mesa, Manila; Philippines
- 14°36′06″N 121°00′42″E

Information
- Type: Private, Catholic
- Motto: English: Jesus Meek and Humble of hearts, make our Hearts like unto Thine Tagalog: Buhay Magpakailanman ang Banal na Puso ni Hesus sa Ating mga Puso
- Established: 1947
- Principal: Dr. Henry A. Davalos
- Grades: K to 12
- Campus: Urban
- Colors: Red & White
- Song: SHJCS Hymn
- Accreditation: PAASCU Accredited Level 3
- Newspaper: Dilexit Nos
- Affiliations: MAPSA, RCAMES

Sacred Heart of Jesus Catholic School (SHJCS) is a private Catholic school located in Santa Mesa, Manila, beside of it is the Sacred Heart of Jesus Parish. The school's name is named after their parish patron, Sacred Heart of Jesus, as well as St. Margaret Mary Alacoque. The school was formerly known as Sta. Mesa Parochial School. The current director of the school is the Rev. Fr. Marion C. Munda and the current principal is Dr. Henry A. Davalos.

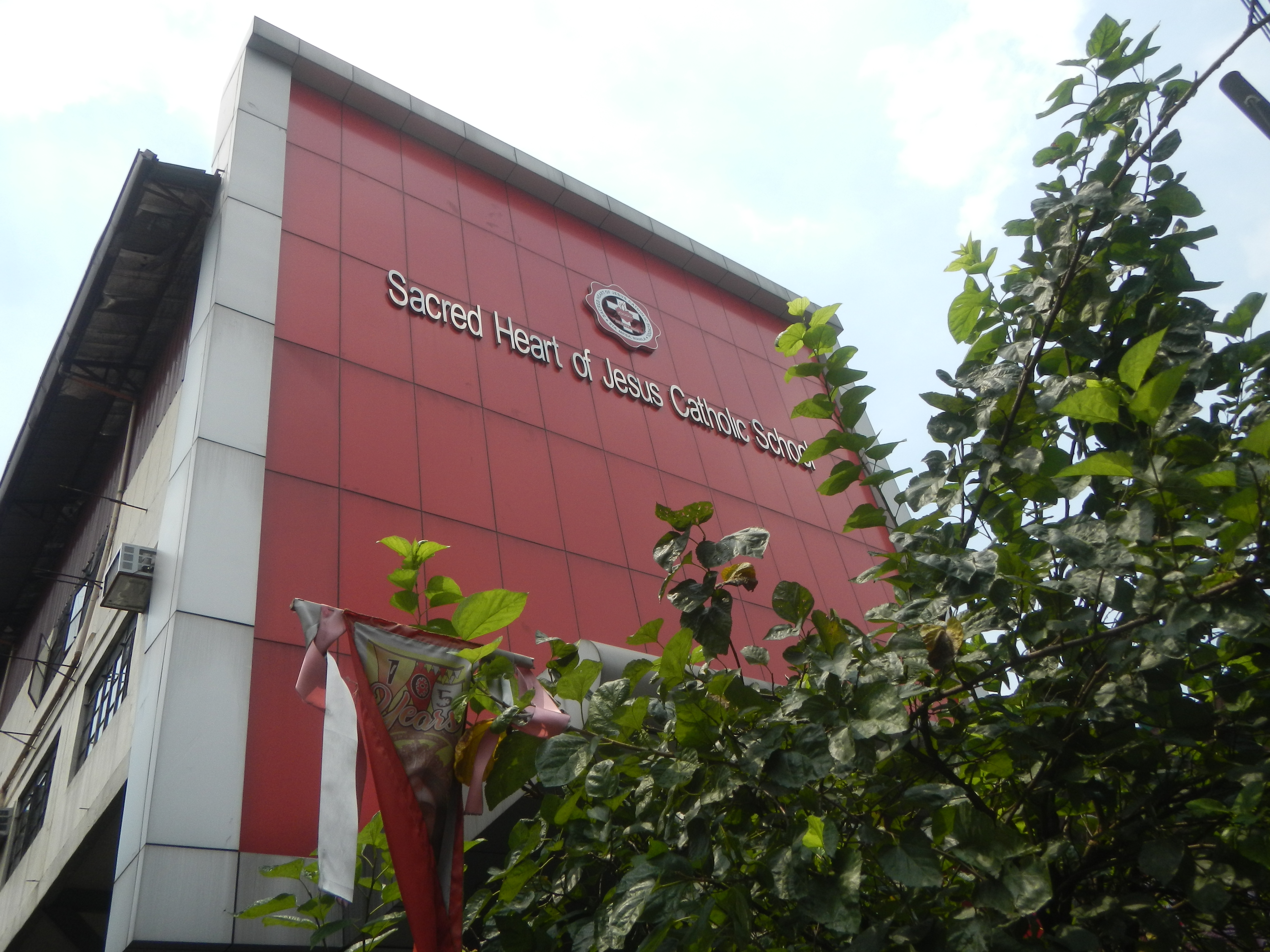
SHJCS Entrance

== History ==
=== 1947 ===
The YLAC FREE SCHOOL was opened to the poor parishioners of Sta Mesa to foster functional literacy. The school initially offered basic education up to Grades l and 2. Fr. Gil de Legaria was the First School Director.

=== 1954 ===
The school obtained Government Recognition from grades 1-4. Soon after, Grades 5 and 6 were added to complete the Elementary Course offered. Thus, the school's name was changed to Sta. Mesa Parochial School (SMPS).

=== 1966 ===
The school acquired its lot and building through the benevolence of Mrs. Albina Tuazon. The school was also granted Government recognition to offer complete elementary courses. The director then was Fr. Ezequiel de Torrano and the assigned school principal was Ms. Juanita Mierr.

=== 1967 ===
A new school was developed during Fr. Ezequielde Torrano's stint to accommodate the growing number of learners. Classes began in first rooms of the New Building. The following Capuchin Fathers took the helm of SMPS as its Directors: Fr. Gil De Legaria, Fr. Rogelio De Bedona, Fr. Exequiel De Torrano, Fr. Jesus Mendoza, Fr. Bernardino Curmagun, Fr. Angel de los Arcos, Fr. Alfredo Micua, Fr. Paulino Velazquez, Fr. Eduardo Dumaual, Fr. Pete Feniz, and Fr. Mike Peralta. The principals who have served the School were: Mrs. Lourdes del Rosario, Miss Juanita Mierr and Miss Amparo Araque.

=== 1995 ===
In 1995, the management of the institution was turned over to the Diocesan Fathers upon the instruction of Jaime Cardinal Sin, the Archbishop of Manila.

The first Diocesan Priest to be appointed as Director of the School was Monsignor Mario D. Enriquez with Mrs. Rosie Pineda as Principal. Significant changes were initiated starting with the construction and inauguration of the covered court, renovation of offices, relocation and construction of Dental and Medical Clinic, Library and School's Canteen.

SMPS became a member of MAPSA (Manila Archdiocesan and Parochial Schools Association).

=== 1996 ===
Mrs Josefina Madrid was appointed as Principal.

=== 2000 ===
Msgr. Enriquez was succeeded by Rev. Fr. Eugenio L. Castañeda. Rev. Fr. Marion C. Munda was then appointed as assistant director. Another milestone was added to the history of SMPS, a big decision was made by the administrators to open the High School Department to cater the growing demand of the community.

=== 2003 ===
In 2003, a four-story building was constructed. The new building was named after and inaugurated by Jaime Cardinal Sin on the first day of August. The new edifice houses the library, classrooms, science laboratory, computer room, faculty area, restrooms, home economics room, canteen, production office, and the mini grotto of the Blessed Virgin Mary.

The School was granted a government permit to operate its first and second year levels of the secondary course.

=== 2004 ===
A new building was constructed to respond to the increasing number of students.

=== 2007 ===
As a result of the Board of Trustees' resolutions, Sta. Mesa Parochial School changed its name to SACRED HEART OF JESUS CATHOLIC SCHOOL. It was named after the patron of the parish, the Sacred Heart of Jesus. In the same year, SHJCS obtained its Government Permit to offer the complete Secondary Course (1st-4th year). The High School department received government recognition. At that time, Rev. Fr. Marion C. Munda was appointed as interim principal and Dr. Henry A. Davalos as Vice-Principal.

=== 2008 ===
Dr. Henry A. Davalos was appointed as school principal.

=== 2010 ===
Rev. Fr. Solomon A. Jardinero was appointed as the new school director and principal, and Dr Henry A. Davalos as assistant principal. Under Fr. Jardinero's term, the speech laboratory constructed and the science laboratory was renovated. The school also applied for FAPE certification.

=== 2011 ===
Rev. Fr. Marion C. Munda was appointed as the new school director, Msgr. Mario D. Enriquez as finance officer, and Dr. Henry A. Davalos as school principal. The school also prepared for an accreditation by the Philippine Association of Accredited Schools, Colleges, and Universities.

=== 2012 ===
The school has applied for a candidate status for accreditation by PAASCU. A consultancy visit soon followed. K - 12 was also implemented at that time to adhere to the mandate of DepEd.

=== 2013 ===
The school was granted candidate status by PAASCU.

The school facade was renovated, and additional classrooms were constructed to cater the increasing population of the school.

=== 2014 ===
The Immaculate Heart of Mary Chapel was constructed and blessed by His Excellency Bishop Socrates B. Villegas.

=== 2015 ===
The school passed the PAASCU accreditation and was granted Level 1 status. The school was granted a permit by the Department of Education to offer Senior High School (Grades 11 and 12) curriculum for academic track (Humanities and Social Science - HUMSS, Science, Technology, Engineering and Math - STEM, and Accounting and Business Management - ABM) was approved and ready for implementation.

=== 2016 ===
Continuous implementation of the K-12 program, marking the first Batch of Senior High School (Grade 11).

=== 2017 ===
Additional classrooms were constructed, and the gymnasium was renovated to cater to the needs of the SHS. The school also prepares for a 2nd visit by the PAASCU.

=== 2018 ===
The first batch of Senior High School students graduated, followed by the continuous implementation of Senior High School, the second batch (Grades 11 & 12), offering of new curriculum of the Pre-School Department - the Montessori Approach- as well as the improvement of the facilities in the Preparatory Department and school canteen.

=== 2019 ===
Antonio Cardinal Tagle blessed the newly renovated School Canteen, Pre-School Classroom, Gymnasium, and TLE laboratory. The school underwent a revisit by PAASCU. In the same year, the school was granted level II status by PAASCU.

=== 2020 ===
At the onset of the Covid-19 pandemic, the school transitioned from face-to-face instruction to virtual/online learning. The school offered varied learning modalities like online and modular learning to ensure the continuity of learning. The school continued with the improvement of its facilities by constructing the school elevator.

=== 2021 ===
The school continued to offer the different modalities (Online, Modular and Blended) in the second year of the implementation of the new normal curriculum. His Excellency Most Reverend Broderick S. Pabillo blessed the newly constructed school elevator on June 11, 2021.

=== 2022 ===
With the transition from online to face to face, the school launched its flagship program in curriculum, L.E.A.P. (Learners' Enhancement Academic Progression) program. This program is part of the schools academic innovation in consonance with Standards-Based Instruction, The school was invited to apply for PAASCU Level 3 accreditation.

=== 2023 ===
The school was granted level III status by PAASCU; a testament that SHJCS continues to offer quality basic Catholic education post-pandemic. With the full implementation of standards based Instruction (Instruction, Supervision Assessment and Intervention), the school introduced its post-pandemic curriculum innovation R.I.S.E. (Revitalized and Inclusive Standards-based Education)

The institution continues to sustain its commitment to achieve Academic Excellence and total quality service through continuous improvement of its programs. With the infinite love of the Sacred Heart of Jesus, guidance and inspiration of the Holy Spirit and intercession of the Blessed Mother, SHJCS looks ahead with great optimism for a better future.
