= Davao Doctors Hospital =

Private hospital in Davao City, Philippines

- Location within Mindanao Location within Philippines

Geography
- Location: 118 E. Quirino Avenue, Davao City, Philippines
- Coordinates: 7°04′13″N 125°36′16″E

Organization
- Type: Level 4 Tertiary Facility
- Affiliated university: Davao Doctors' College

Services
- Emergency department: Yes
- Beds: 250

History
- Founded: July 1, 1969; 57 years ago

Links
- Website: www.ddh.com.ph

Davao Doctors Hospital is a privately owned hospital located in Davao City, Philippines. It was founded in 1969 in the Southern Philippines. It has 250 beds and a 10-storey Medical Tower Building that houses more than 130 active members of medical staff in varied specialties and sub-specialties.

== Background ==
In 1961, Dr. Honorio Hilario, owner of Botica Villa, invited Dr. Luisito Guanlao to set up a clinic in the pharmacy. Within four years, more doctors set up clinics there as well.

In August 1966, Clinica Hilario, Inc. was incorporated by doctors Honorio Hilario Sr., Luisito Guanlao, Agusto Abela, Juan Belisario Jr., Rodrigo Casiño, Honorio dela Cruz, Jose Gantioqui, Jr., Benigno Magpantay, Gerino Pangan, Pacita San Vicente, Crisostomo Serrano Sr., Herminio Villano Sr., and Amador Villanueva. From the original 15 incorporators with Php400,000 capitalization in 1966, the corporation's stockholders increased to 154 with a capitalization of Php2 million in 1969. Starting with a 50-bed occupancy, Davao Doctors Hospital opened its doors to the public.

In the 1970s, Davao Doctors Hospital bed capacity increased to 150 and provisions for an intensive-care unit was set in place, along with an Annex for doctors' clinics. To complement the hospital's nursing care, DDH opened the Davao Doctors Hospital School of Nursing, which eventually became as the subsidiary now known as Davao Doctors College.

The construction and expansion of building complexes continued from 1979 to 1986. The DDH extension building for the renovation of the operating room and delivery room was done in 1991, the Medical Arts building in 1994, and the Medical Tower for doctors' offices in 1999.

In 2000, Davao Doctors Hospital became the first ISO-accredited hospital in the region and the second in the Philippines, having been awarded the ISO 9001 Certification. The hospital continued to foster many other first in the region, such as its Radiation Oncology Department becoming fully functional.

By May 2008, Metro Pacific Investments Corporation or MPIC bought a 34% shareholding in Davao Doctors Hospital. Under the chairmanship of Mr. Manuel V. Pangilinan, a new board of directors was set in place.

Davao Doctors Hospital offers diagnostic, therapeutic, and intensive care facilities and medical specialties- cardiovascular medicine, orthopedics, gastroenterology and endocrinology, obstetrics-gynecology, neurology and neurosurgery, ophthalmology, nephrology, digestive and liver diseases, radiology and radiation oncology.
