= West Metro Medical Center =

Private hospital in Zamboanga CIty, Philippines

- Metro Pacific Zamboanga Hospital Corporation

- Location within Mindanao mainland Location within Philippines

Geography
- Location: Zamboanga City, Western Mindanao, Philippines
- Coordinates: 6°55′24″N 122°04′45″E

Organization
- Type: Secondary

Services
- Beds: 110

History
- Founded: May 18, 2015; 11 years ago

Links
- Website: www.westmetro.com.ph

West Metro Medical Center is a secondary-level private hospital in Zamboanga City, Philippines.

As of 2015, the hospital has a capacity of 110 beds. Ongoing construction of an annex will increase bed capacity to 190, making it the largest private hospital in the Zamboanga Peninsula and Archipelago.

== History ==
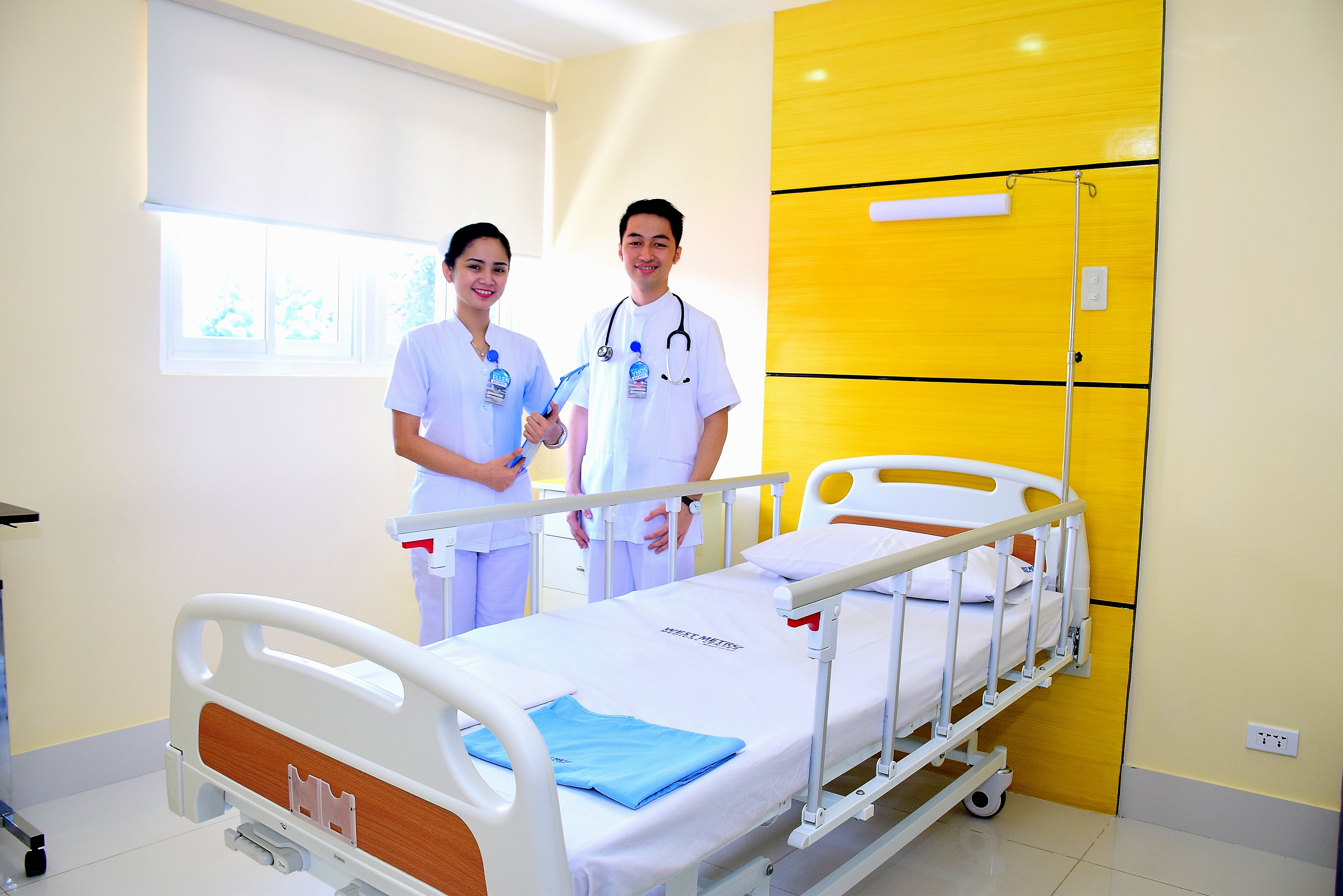
A typical West Metro patient room

West Metro Medical and Diagnostic Clinic in Barangay Ayala

West Metro officially opened on May 18, 2015, after Metro Pacific Zamboanga Hospital Corporation signed a long-term lease of the land, buildings and equipment of Western Mindanao Medical Center, Inc.

Soon after acquisition, Metro Pacific installed a new management team and infused capital for the completion of a four-storey annex building which will increase the Hospital's capacity from 110 to 190 beds. The annex is partially opened housing doctors' clinics, patient rooms, the operating room complex, and other features. Aside from the annex, the existing building is undergoing major renovations.

On July 14–15, 2016 the hospital management organized a medical symposium and exposition at the Garden Orchid Hotel Convention Center which is the first medical symposium organized by a private hospital in Western Mindanao.

West Metro opened a medical and diagnostic clinic in Barangay Ayala serving residents of West Coast, Zamboanga City on March 15, 2017.

== Management ==
West Metro is managed by the Metro Pacific Zamboanga Hospital Corporation, a wholly owned subsidiary of Metro Pacific Hospitals Holdings, Inc., the hospital investment arm of Metro Pacific Investments Corporation. West Metro is the ninth hospital of MPIC.
