= Santa Mesa =

District of Manila, Metro Manila, Philippines

Coordinates: 14°36′N 121°01′E

- District of Manila
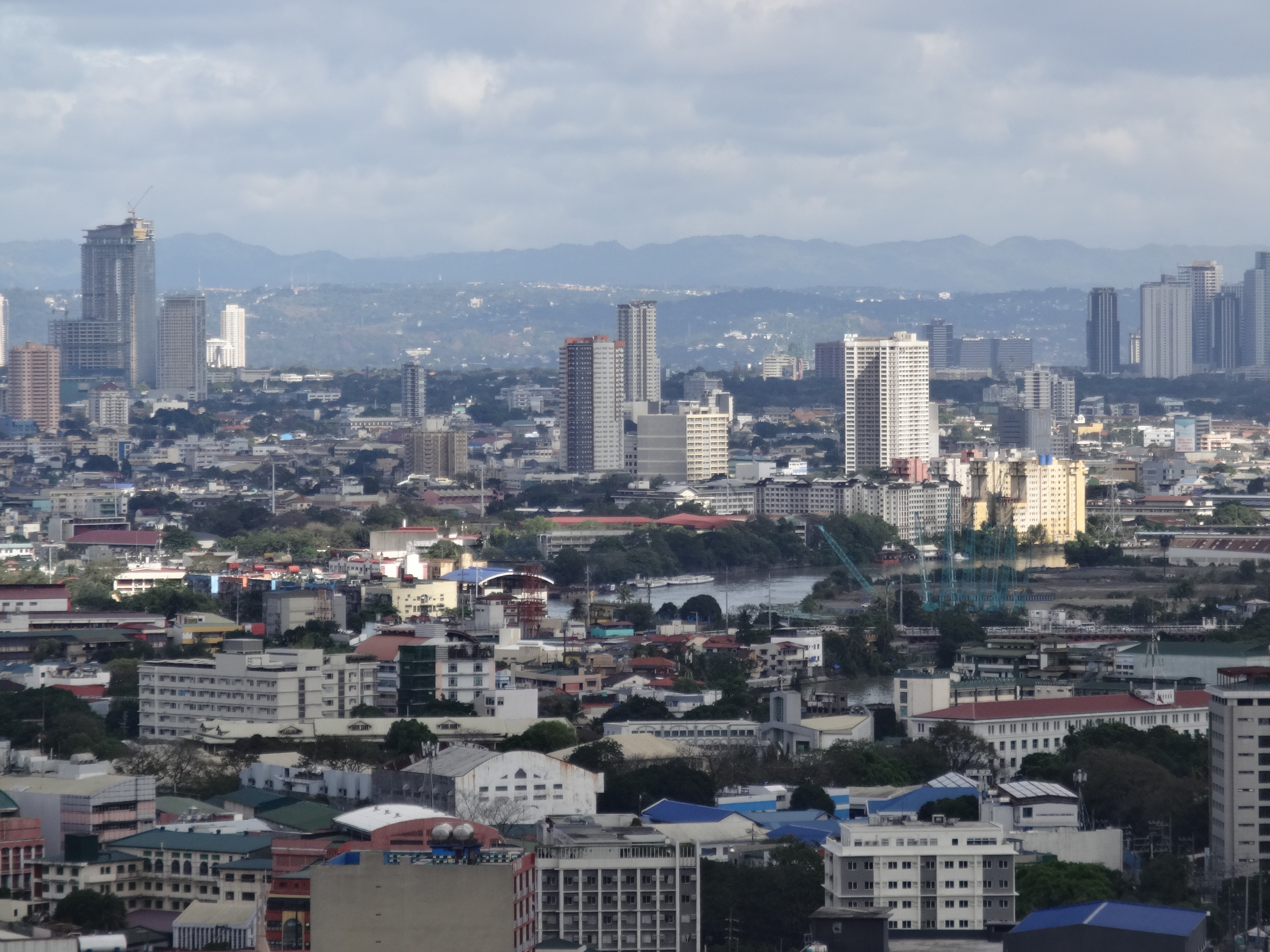
- Aerial view of Santa Mesa

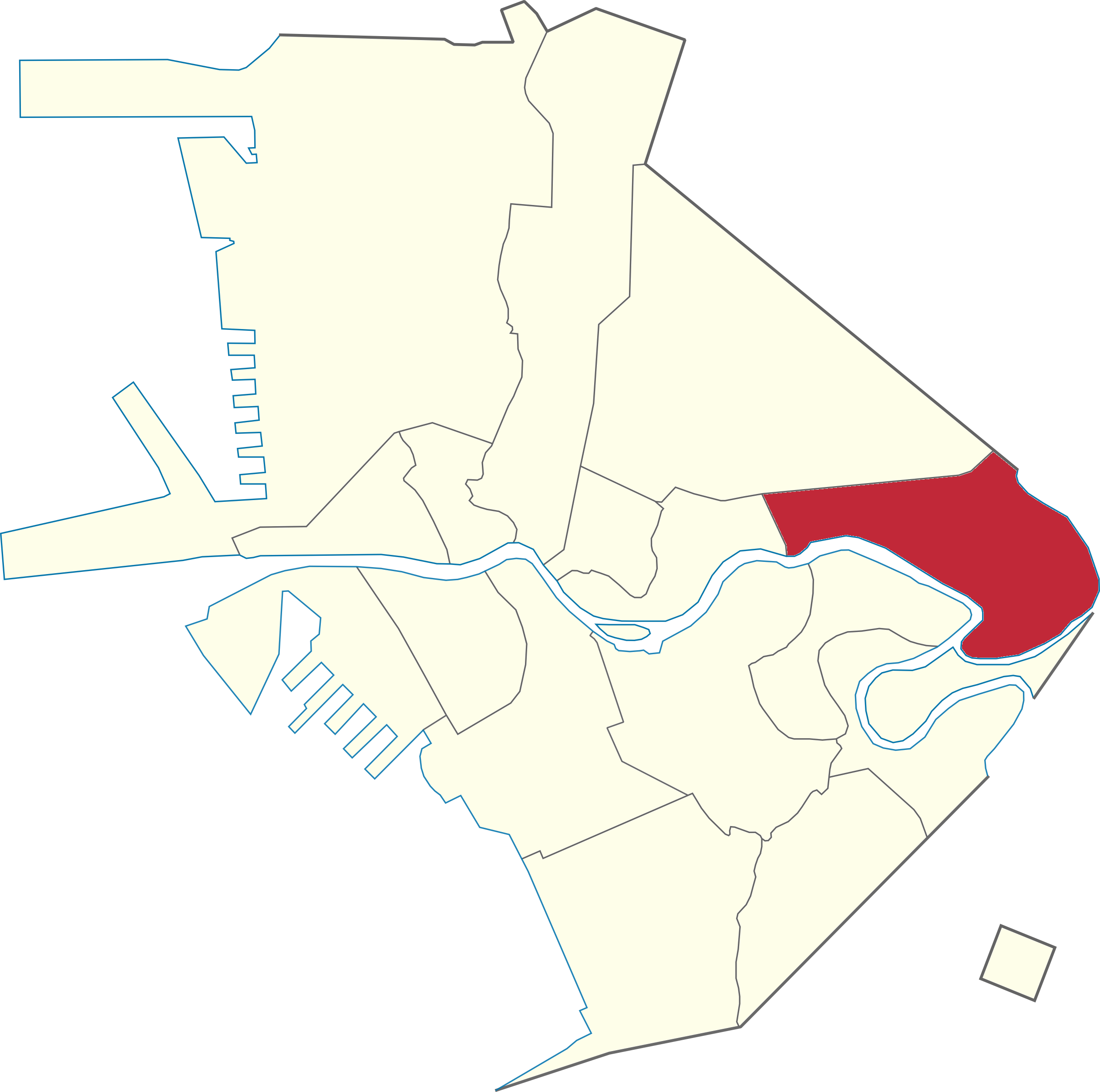
- Country: Philippines
- Region: National Capital Region
- City: Manila
- Congressional District: 6th District
- Barangays: 51

Area
  - Total: 2.6101 km^{2} (1.0078 sq mi)

Population (2024)
  - Total: 112,987
  - Density: 43,288/km^{2} (112,120/sq mi)
- Time zone: UTC+08:00 (Philippine Standard Time)
- Zip codes: 1016
- Area codes: 2

Santa Mesa is a district in Manila, Philippines. It is bounded on its southwest side by the Pasig River, and on its south and east sides by the San Juan River. Its land borders include the districts of San Miguel to the west, Sampaloc to the north, and Quezon City to the northeast.

Santa Mesa was formerly a part of the Sampaloc district, from which it was partitioned and separated after it had its own parish in 1903. The parish is now known as Old Sta. Mesa (Poblacion), which extends from Victorino Mapa Street (Calle Santa Mesa) to Magsaysay Boulevard (Santa Mesa Boulevard).

It is also known as the birthplace of Bongbong Marcos, the current President of the Philippines.

== Etymology ==
The district's name comes from the Jesuits, who christened the area Hermandad de Santa Mesa de la Misericordia (Spanish for "Brotherhood of the Holy Table of Mercy"). The local parish church had for its titular Sacred Heart of Jesus, which formed part of the phrase the "Center of the Table is the Sacred Heart which all Graces and Mercy flowed down." The Tuason family are the landlords of Santa Mesa during the Spanish colonial period offered an obra pía ("pious work"), and provided social services to the people Doña Albina Tuason also donated the Land where the Church is located even right at this modern days.

A more popular folk etymology is that the name is a corruption of the Spanish term Santa Misa ("Holy Mass").

== History ==
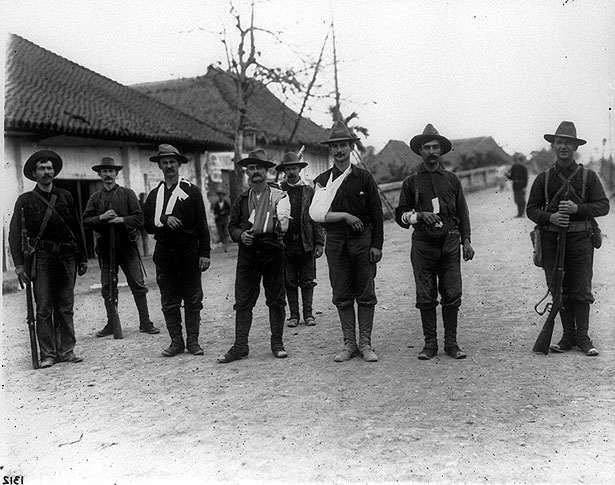
Wounded soldiers during the Philippine–American War.

Santa Mesa was situated in the alluvial deposits at the confluence of Pasig and San Juan Rivers. It was owned by a Jesuits religious order during the Spanish era, and it is in this period that Santa Mesa got its name. Santa Mesa is better known for its role in the Philippine–American War, in which the area became a battlefield during the Philippine–American War. The conflict started when Pvt. William W. Grayson shot a Filipino soldier in San Juan Bridge between Santa Mesa and San Juan. In late 2003, the National Historical Commission of the Philippines had determined that the conflict did not happen on San Juan Bridge, but at the juncture of Sociego and Silencio Streets. However, a 2023 study done by Ronnie Miravite Casalmir places the event at the corner of Sociego-Arguelles, not at Sociego-Silencio where they erroneously have the marker. The Ronnie Miravite Casalmir Study debunks the previous findings of Dr. Benito Legarda which was the basis for the erroneous placement of the marker at Sociego-Silencio. According to Ronnie Miravite Casalmir, the smoking gun for the Sociego-Arguelles corner is the presence of Blockhouse 7 in the background of Grayson's reenactment photo. The orientation of this Blockhouse 7 image lines up with the corner of Sociego and Arguelles when compared with the known photo of Blockhouse 7 taken from the same direction. In addition, the distance estimate of Lieut. Whedon placed the 100-yard distance from Santol at Sociego-Arguelles, not Sociego-Silencio. This meant that when Lieut. Whedon ordered the detachment at Santol to patrol 100 yards, he meant them to patrol all the way to Sociego-Arguelles. Col. Stotsenburg corroborated Lieut. Whedon's distance estimate. Prof. Ambeth R. Ocampo calls the evidence presented by Ronnie Miravite Casalmir as new and compelling. Prof. Ocampo agrees that this evidence shows that the marker should be moved one block away, from Sociego-Silencio to Sociego-Arguelles. Maj. Lillian A. Pfluke (Ret.), West Point Class of 1980, and founder of the American War Memorials Overseas Inc. also agrees and has a note on their U.S. War Memorials website that the proper placement of the marker should be at the adjoining intersection of Sociego Street and Arguelles Street where the incident actually occurred.

Up until the early American period, Santa Mesa was one of the barrios that comprised Sampaloc, which was a town of the defunct province of Manila before it was absorbed by the city of Manila upon its chartering in 1901. In 1903, Santa Mesa became a separate religious district out of Sampaloc when the first and oldest parish in the Philippines in honor of its titular, the Sagrado Corazon de Jesus del Misericordia, was established. It also became the cradle of devotion to the Sagrado Corazon in the Archdiocese of Manila. The parish is now known as the Old Santa Mesa, extending from V. Mapa to Santa Mesa Boulevard. The neighborhood was composed of wealthy and aristocratic Spanish and Filipino families who built summer houses, examples of which are the Sociego Mansion, formerly home of the Tuason family, and the Carriedo Mansion (currently known as the Antique House in Pureza), formerly home of Governor General Francisco Carriedo y Peredo who spearheaded the clean water system of the City of Manila. Affluent families were attracted to Santa Mesa's cooler climate and the picturesque streets that were lined with ylang-ylang trees along Santa Mesa Boulevard. The abundance of these trees started a perfume industry in Santa Mesa—flowers were harvested, pressed and the oil were exported in great quantities to perfumeries in France. However, for political purposes, Santa Mesa remained part of Sampaloc.

The small community became the location of the hospital to treat the wounded during World War II. The town experienced its growth after the war. Santa Mesa was the site of a 1950s suburban development because of its proximity to central Manila. The Santa Mesa Market was constructed around this period. It was a big shopping complex, and became popular for the selling of Post eXchange or PX Goods from U.S. bases in the Philippines, which is why it was called Stop & Shop.

When the congressional districts of Manila were created, Santa Mesa was effectively separated from Sampaloc, falling to the jurisdiction of the 6th District. The national census still considers Santa Mesa as a part of Sampaloc for statistical purposes.

== Geography ==
Santa Mesa is located in the eastern section of the City of Manila. It is bounded to the west by Lacson Avenue, separating it from San Miguel; by Ramon Magsaysay Boulevard to the north, bordering it from Sampaloc. The northeast boundary of Santa Mesa is west of SM City Sta. Mesa. Although the mall has "Santa Mesa" on its name, it is located in Quezon City very near the city limits of Manila. Originally, Santa Mesa extended all the way up to Santa Mesa Heights and Barrio Matatalaib, which is now known as Barangay Santo Domingo.

The southwestern side of Santa Mesa is along the Pasig River while the southern and eastern sides are along the San Juan River. Across the San Juan River are the cities of San Juan to the east and a small portion of Mandaluyong to the southeast. Across the Pasig River are the Manila districts of Santa Ana to the south and Pandacan to the southeast.

The topography of the area is relatively flat as some of the natural variations in elevations have been evened out due to urbanization.

== Sites of interest ==
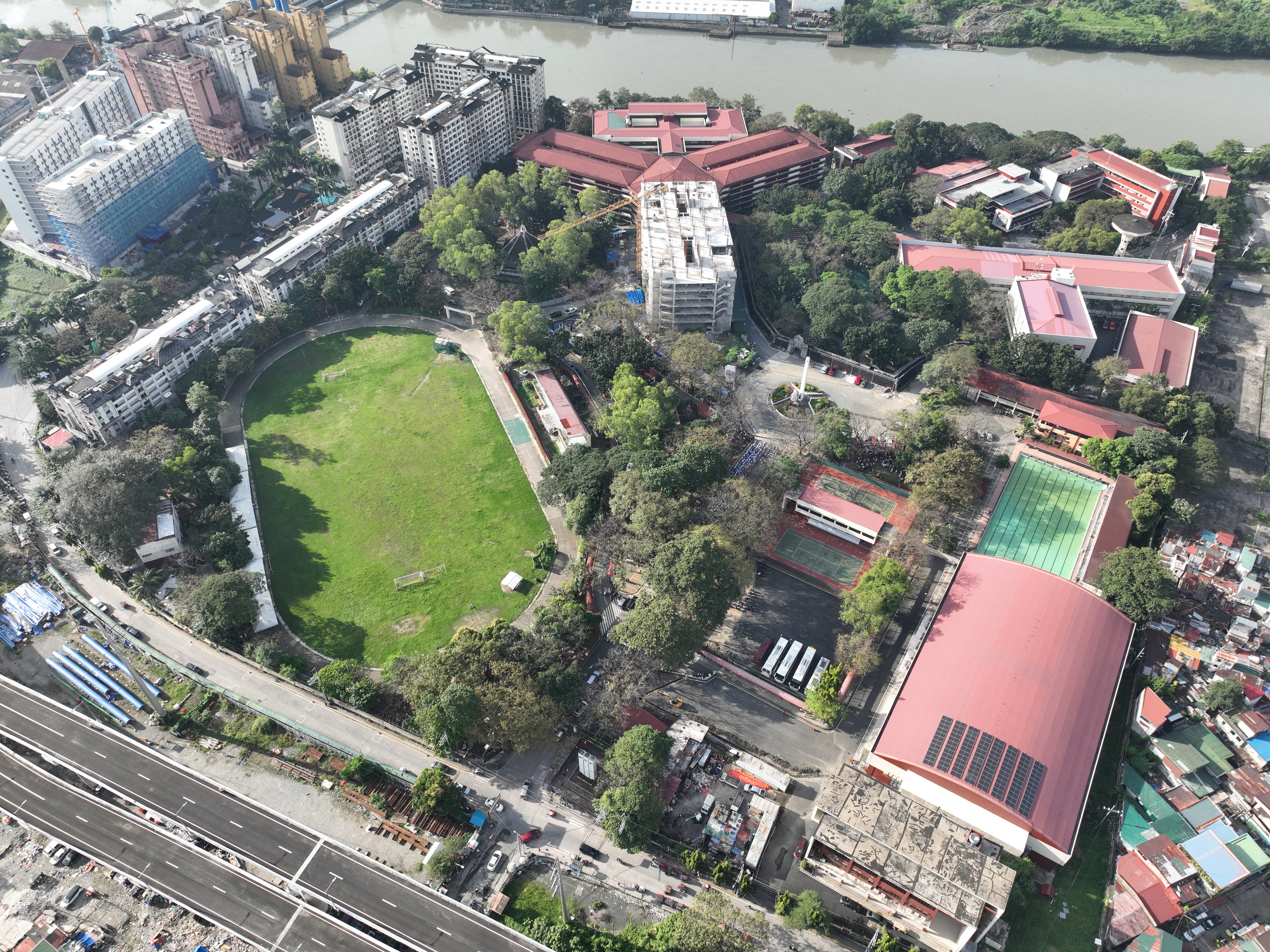
Aerial view of the main campus of the Polytechnic University of the Philippines

- Bacood
- Banda Kawayan Pilipinas (Bamboo Band Philippines)
- United Church of Christ in the Philippines (UCCP - Bacood)
- Philippine Independent Church Bacood (Good Shepherd Parish)
- Mabini Shrine (Manila), former home of Apolinario Mabini, Philippines Revolution hero, located inside PUP.
- Our Lady of Lourdes Hospital
- Polytechnic University of the Philippines
- Recurso de Madriaga Pescado
- Sacred Heart of Jesus Catholic School
- Carriedo Mansion ( former home of the Governor General Don Francisco Carriedo y' Peredo who made the water system project of Manila)

=== Churches ===
Churches of Santa Mesa
Name	Image	Location / GPS Coordinates	Denomination	Notes
Baptist Bible Church		Sociego Street	Baptists	
Gloria Dei Lutheran Church		Old Santa Mesa Street	Lutheran	
Jehovah's Witness Kingdom Hall		Old Santa Mesa Street	Jehovah's Witnesses	
Nuestra Señora de Salvacion Parish Church		Anonas Street cor Hipodromo Street	Roman Catholic	
Our Lady of Fatima Parish Church		Lubiran Street cor. Mag. Jose Abad Santos Street	Roman Catholic	
Sacred Heart of Jesus Parish Church		Old Santa Mesa Street	Roman Catholic	
Sambahan sa Banal na Hapag (IEMELIF Church)		Magsaysay Boulevard	Methodist	
Seventh-day Adventist Church		Hippodromo Street	Adventist	
SM Valenzuela (IEMELIF Church)		Old Santa Mesa Street	Methodist	
Abundant Life Ministry Inc.		Teresa Street	Born Again	

=== Parks and plazas ===
Parks and plazas in Santa Mesa
Name	Image	Location / GPS Coordinates	Notes
Bacood Park		Valenzuela Street	
Paraiso ng Batang Maynila		Bataan cor. Leyte Streets, Bacood	
PUP Lagoon		PUP Mabini Campus, Anonas Street	
PUP Linear Park		PUP Mabini Campus, Anonas Street	
PUP Nemesio E. Prudente Freedom Park (Freedom Plaza)		PUP Mabini Campus, Anonas Street	

== Barangays ==
Santa Mesa is made up of 51 barangays, grouped into seven zones of the City of Manila. For statistical convenience for housing and population, the data for Santa Mesa is grouped with the data of Sampaloc.

Zones

- Zone 58: Barangays 587 to 593
- Zone 59: Barangays 594 to 601
- Zone 60: Barangays 602 to 606 and 610 to 613
- Zone 61: Barangays 607 to 609 and 614 to 618
- Zone 62: Barangays 619 to 625
- Zone 63: Barangays 626 to 630
- Zone 64: Barangays 631 to 636

Barangays

Barangay	Land area (km^{2})	Population (2024)
Zone 58
Barangay 587	0.07333 km^{2}	2,685
Barangay 587-A	0.02194 km^{2}	1,227
Barangay 588	0.01947 km^{2}	1,037
Barangay 589	0.03283 km^{2}	559
Barangay 590	0.03619 km^{2}	2,854
Barangay 591	0.06667 km^{2}	2,085
Barangay 592	0.03228 km^{2}	2,119
Barangay 593	0.04383 km^{2}	1,628
Zone 59
Barangay 594	0.03035 km^{2}	686
Barangay 595	0.04867 km^{2}	4,229
Barangay 596	0.02226 km^{2}	2,467
Barangay 597	0.03043 km^{2}	1,544
Barangay 598	0.07679 km^{2}	10,510
Barangay 599	0.03596 km^{2}	4,577
Barangay 600	0.06367 km^{2}	6,276
Barangay 601	0.1163 km^{2}	7,765
Zone 60
Barangay 602	0.1353 km^{2}	2,027
Barangay 603	0.04759 km^{2}	739
Barangay 604	0.02000 km^{2}	1,581
Barangay 605	0.03845 km^{2}	2,242
Barangay 606	0.03072 km^{2}	443
Barangay 610	0.02922 km^{2}	991
Barangay 611	0.03176 km^{2}	774
Barangay 612	0.02191 km^{2}	718
Barangay 613	0.02612 km^{2}	579
Zone 61
Barangay 607	0.04699 km^{2}	1,443
Barangay 608	0.02579 km^{2}	821
Barangay 609	0.02867 km^{2}	859
Barangay 614	0.01654 km^{2}	406
Barangay 615	0.02034 km^{2}	1,875
Barangay 616	0.03139 km^{2}	1,117
Barangay 617	0.03125 km^{2}	1,300
Barangay 618	0.04016 km^{2}	749
Zone 62
Barangay 619	0.2010 km^{2}	1,288
Barangay 620	0.02244 km^{2}	736
Barangay 621	0.07931 km^{2}	2,070
Barangay 622	0.02481 km^{2}	1,229
Barangay 623	0.02529 km^{2}	980
Barangay 624	0.02421 km^{2}	1,510
Barangay 625	0.03206 km^{2}	794
Zone 63
Barangay 626	0.03282 km^{2}	1,502
Barangay 627	0.04027 km^{2}	1,618
Barangay 628	0.1839 km^{2}	16,279
Barangay 629	0.03937 km^{2}	1,640
Barangay 630	0.2551 km^{2}	6,552
Zone 64
Barangay 631	0.04890 km^{2}	1,045
Barangay 632	0.01467 km^{2}	576
Barangay 633	0.01554 km^{2}	548
Barangay 634	0.05924 km^{2}	960
Barangay 635	0.05317 km^{2}	723
Barangay 636	0.08512 km^{2}	2,025

== Infrastructure and transportation ==
=== Roads and highways ===
The NLEX Connector traverses parts of Santa Mesa parallel to the PNR NSCR route and has two exits at Magsaysay Boulevard and another one near Valenzuela Street Extension.

=== Rail ===
LRT Line 2 traverses the Magsaysay Boulevard, and has two stations within Santa Mesa: Pureza station and V. Mapa station. The under-construction North–South Commuter Railway will have one station in Santa Mesa, the Santa Mesa station.

== Notable people ==
- Benny Abante, congressman of the 6th District of Manila
- Betty Go-Belmonte, co-founder of the Philippine Daily Inquirer
- Bongbong Marcos, 17th President of the Philippines
- Carla Abellana, actress
- Elmer Borlongan, painter
- Gary Valenciano, singer and actor
- Sharon Cuneta, actress and singer
