= Our Lady of Lourdes Hospital (Manila) =

Private hospital in Manila, Philippines

- Metro Pacific Investments Corporation
- Location within Metro Manila Location within Luzon Location within Philippines

Geography
- Location: 46 P. Sanchez St., Santa Mesa, Manila, Philippines
- Coordinates: 14°35′42″N 121°01′21″E

Organization
- Care system: Private
- Type: General
- Network: East Manila Hospital Managers Corporation

History
- Founded: July 15, 1948 (as an unnamed hospital); 1958 (as OLLH) (Note: Although OLLH acknowledged its 75th anniversary of service in 2023, the hospital's official website states that its current iteration was only officially founded in 1958 by the Missionary Sisters Servants of the Holy Spirit (SSpS).)

Links
- Website: www.ollh-manila.com

Our Lady of Lourdes Hospital (abbreviated as OLLH) is a private non-profit tertiary hospital with 230-bed capacity located in Santa Mesa, Manila, in the Philippines. It is a part of the East Manila Hospital Managers Corporation, a subsidiary of Metro Pacific Investments Corporation. Our Lady of Lourdes Hospital was founded in 1958 by the Missionary Sisters Servants of the Holy Spirit congregation through Our Lady of Lourdes Hospital Inc., a non-stock, non-profit corporation. The hospital is currently managed by Metro Pacific Investments Corporation after the OLLHI agreed on a 20-year lease starting in November 2010.

== History ==
Dr. Carlos Casas conceptualized the birth of the Our Lady of Lourdes Hospital on July 15, 1948 and was co-managed by Dr. Basilio Valdes as medical director. Nuns of the Missionary Sisters Servants of the Holy Spirit were asked to join its nursing staff during post-war Manila. It was then an unnamed hospital. Eventually, the hospital was bought by the Missionary Sisters Servants of the Holy Spirit from Dr. Casas and Valdes.

Our Lady of Lourdes Hospital (OLLH) was founded in 1958 by the Missionary Sisters Servants of the Holy Spirit through the Our Lady of Lourdes Hospital Inc. (OLLHI), a non-stock, non-profit organization. The hospital provides quality healthcare but by that time lacks some of the most needed equipment. Still, the hospital managed to perform better throughout the years. After several challenging years, OLLH became one of the premier hospital in Manila, known for being the birthplace of several notable personalities. The hospital is known for its affordability and good services.

OLLHI agreed to a 20-lease to East Manila Hospital Managers Corporation (EMHMC), a subsidiary of Metro Pacific Investments Corporation (MPIC). Under the lease, the new management was committed to spend ₱350 million (US$8.13 million) over the first five years to upgrade hospital facilities and equipment. After the Missionary Sisters Servants of the Holy Spirit left, Manuel V. Pangilinan took over the management, being the Chairman of the MPIC.

In 2014, the hospital had undergone a major facelift and used a new logo.
