= Davao Doctors' College =

Private college in Davao City, Philippines

Davao Doctors College
- Former name: Davao Doctors Hospital School of Nursing (1975-1981)
- Motto: Aestimamus Vitam
- Motto in English: We value life
- Type: Private, Nonsectarian Coeducational secondary and tertiary education institution
- Established: 1975; 51 years ago
- Chairman: Dr. Daniel C. dela Paz
- President: Prof. Miguel D. Soledad
- Vice-president: Dr. Maria Leah F. Villano (VP for Higher Education & Academic Support); Ms. Angelica L. Torres (VP for Basic Education, Extension &Administration)
- Management Council: Ms. Virginia N. Magdolot Director for Finance; Dr. Lucila T. Lupo Group Head for Academic Support Services; Dr. Estela R. Dequito Group Head, Knowledge Resource management
- Students: 3,500 (estimated)
- Location: General Malvar St, Poblacion Dist., Davao City, Davao del Sur, Philippines; 7°04′18″N 125°36′13″E
- Campus: Urban General Malvar St, Poblacion Dist., Davao City 2.5 hectares (25,000 m^{2})
- Colors: White and Purple
- Website: www.davaodoctors.edu.ph
- Location in Mindanao Location in the Philippines

Davao Doctors College (DDC) is a private and non-sectarian academic institution in Davao City, Philippines. The college was founded in 1975 and supports House of Hopes.

== History ==
Davao Doctors College (DDC), formerly known as the Davao Doctors Hospital School of Nursing (DDHSN), was the brainchild of a group of medical doctors in response to the increasing demand for nurses in Davao Doctors Hospital.

DDC was originally housed within the hospital premises and offered only the three-year Basic Course in Nursing leading to graduate nurse. There were 52 students in the first batch of enrollees, 32 of whom eventually graduated. One hundred percent of the batch passed the Nurse Licensure Exam in 1978.

In 1979, DDHSN expanded its curricular offerings. The Graduate Nurse Program was upgraded to a Bachelor of Science in nursing. Bachelor of Science in biology and pre-dentistry opened in the same year.

- 1981 – DDHSN was officially named Davao Doctors College
- 1990 – Offered BS Physical Therapy and BS Radiologic Technology
- 1994 – Offered Doctor of Optometry
- 1998 – Opened non-health related courses: BS Psychology, BS Hotel and Restaurant Management, BS Computer Science and AB Communication Arts
- 2000 – Start of accreditation by the Philippine Association of Colleges and Universities-Commission on Accreditation (PACUCOA)
- 2001 – Offered Bachelor of Elementary Education and Bachelor of Secondary Education
- 2009 – Offered Bachelor of Science in Occupational Therapy
- 2009 – Offered TESDA Accredited Courses
- 2014 – Offered Bachelor of Science in Medical Laboratory Science and Bachelor of Science in Pharmacy

Current Status of Accredited Programs:

- BS Nursing – Level IV Re-Accredited Status
- BS Biology – Level III Re-Accredited Status
- BS Hospitality Management – Level II Accredited Status
- BS Radiologic Technology – Level II Accredited Status (First in the Philippines); 2nd top-performing Radiologic Technology School in the Philippines
- BS Physical Therapy – Level I Accredited Status
- BS Psychology – Level I Accredited Status
- Doctor of Optometry – Level I Accredited Status

== Academic programs ==
=== Basic education ===
- Senior High School ( Grade 11 to Grade 12)
  - Academic Track:
    - Accountancy, Business and Management (ABM)
    - Science, Technology, and Mathematics (STEM)
    - Humanities and Social Sciences (HUMSS)
    - General Academic Strand (GAS)
    - Technical, Vocational & Livelihood (TVL)

=== Higher education ===
- Bachelor of Science in Radiologic Technology
- Bachelor of Science in Medical Laboratory Science
- Bachelor of Science in Hospitality Management
- Doctor of Optometry
- Bachelor of Science in Biology
- Bachelor of Science in Nursing
- Bachelor of Science in Entrepreneurship
- Bachelor of Science in Occupational Therapy
- Bachelor of Science in Physical Therapy
- Bachelor of Science in Psychology
- Bachelor of Science in Tourism Management
- Bachelor of Science in Pharmacy

=== Graduate Program ===
- Master of Arts in Nursing

Major in Clinical Management Major in Academic Management

- Master of Science in Radiologic Technology

== Gallery ==
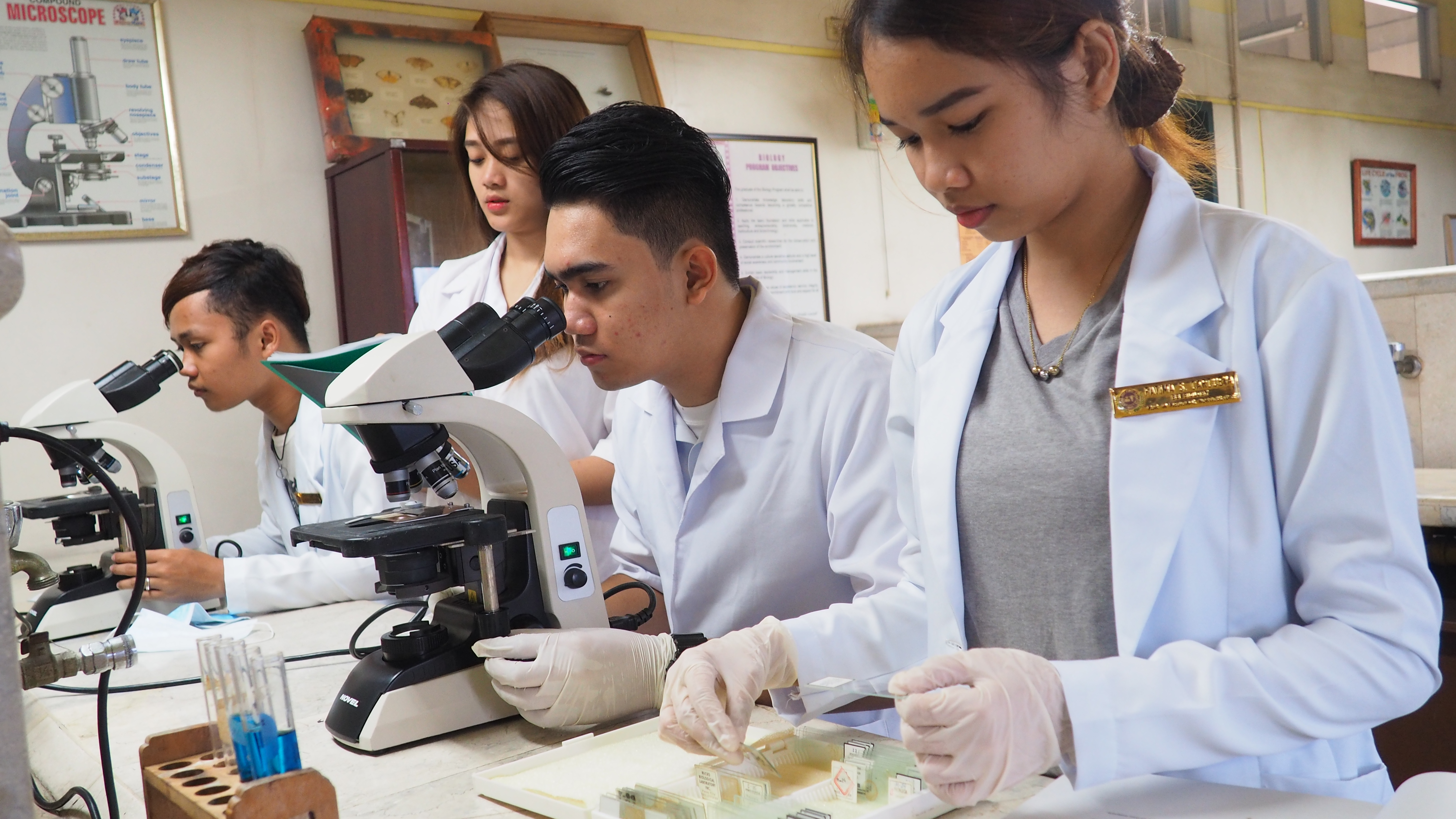
Bachelor of Science in Biology

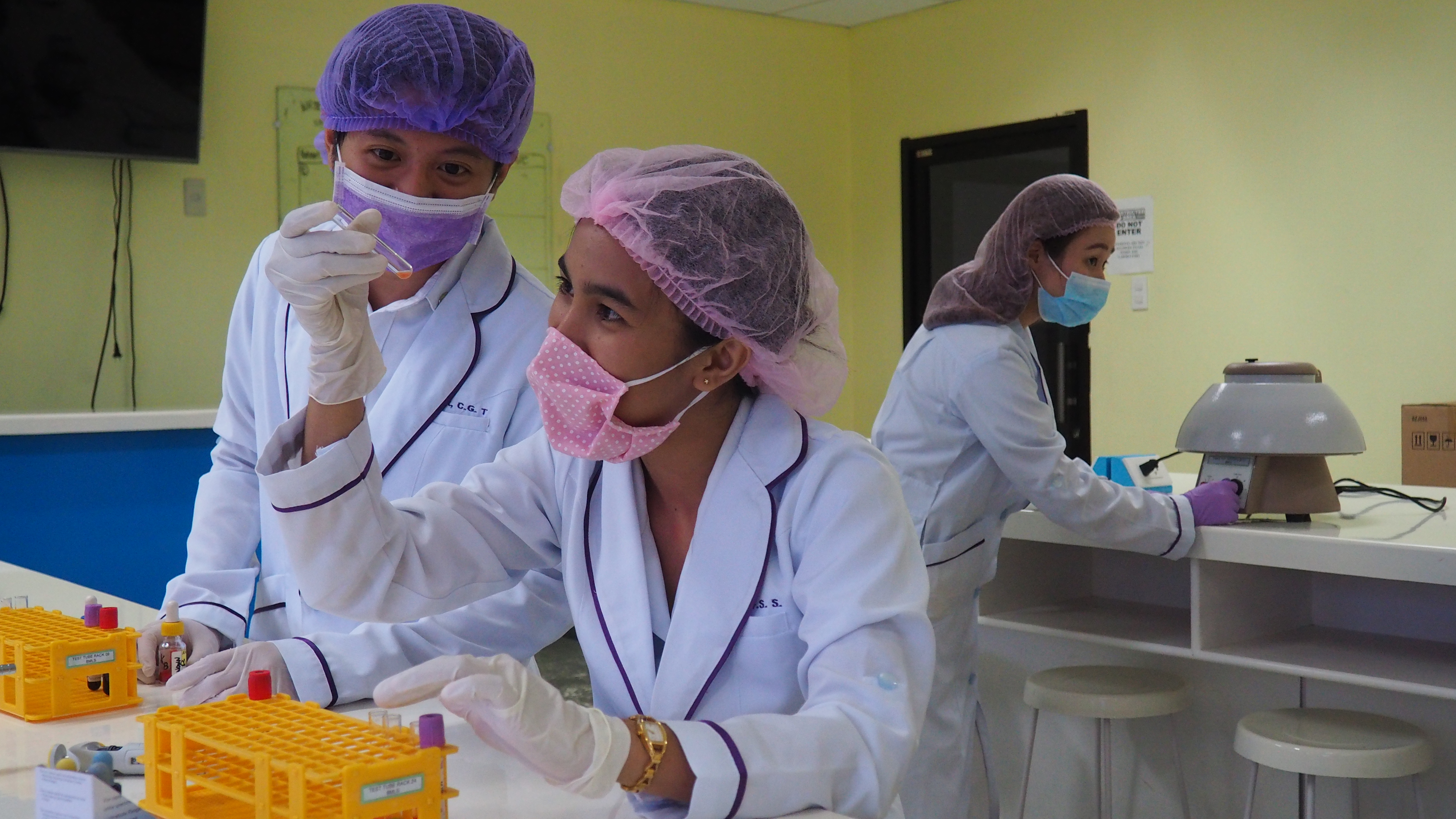
Bachelor of Science in Medical Laboratory Science

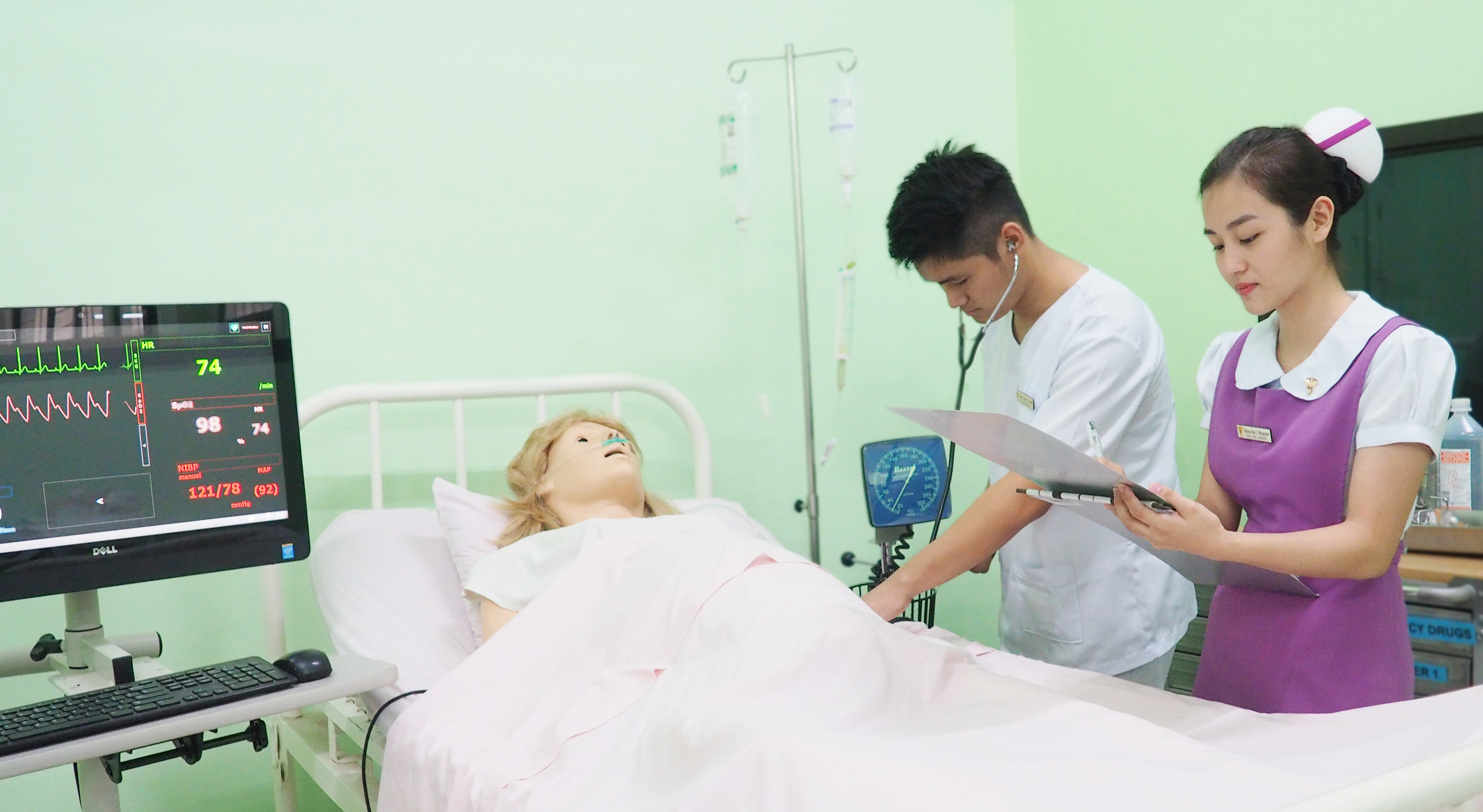
Bachelor of Science in Nursing

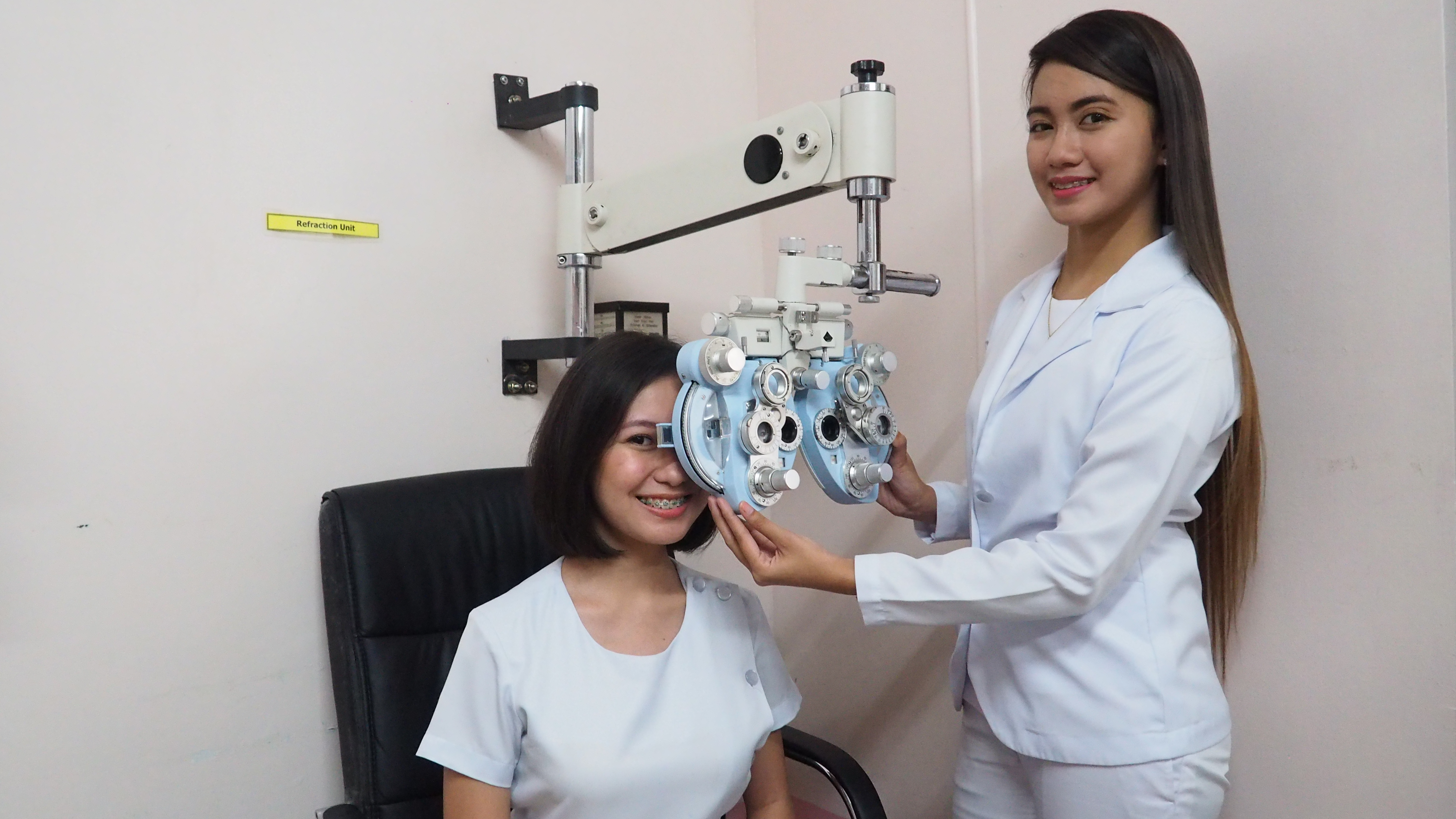
Doctor of Optometry

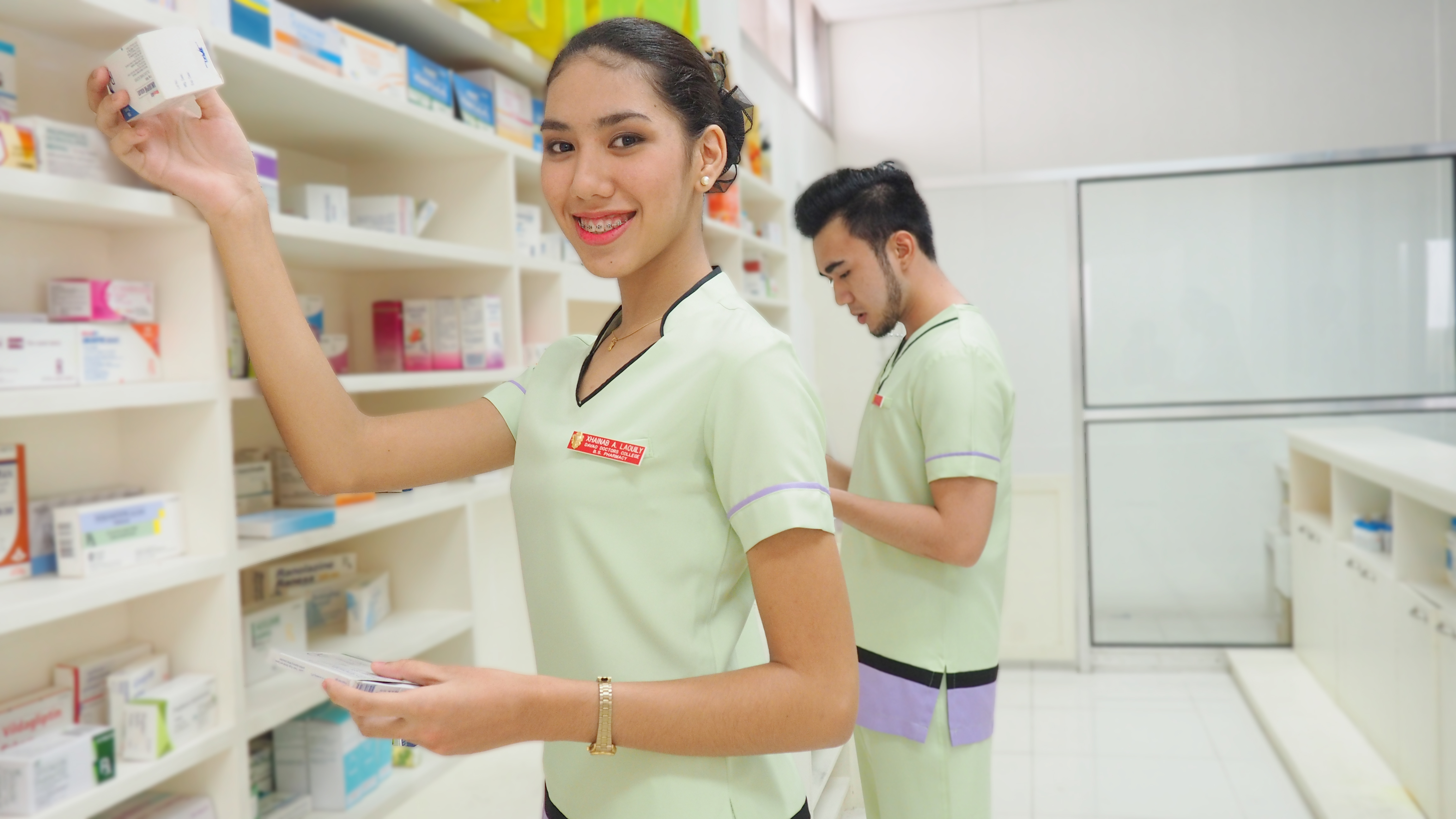
Bachelor of Science in Pharmacy
