= Philippine investment climate =

This article describes the Philippine investment climate.

== Overview of Philippine investment trends ==
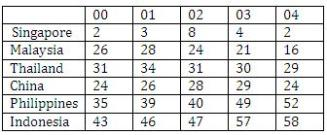
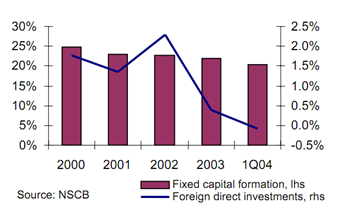
In an AT Kearney Survey of Investment Intentions of 1000 leading MNCs, Philippines did not figure in the top 20 locations while Singapore, Malaysia, China and Thailand did. In the years 2000-2004, %of investment compared to GDP has been declining.

The Philippines ranked 144 out of 183 economies surveyed in the World Bank’s Doing Business 2010 report, an annual survey of different economies on the ease of doing business. Of the 10 factors measured in the survey, the Philippines scored 162 in starting a business, 132 in protecting investors, 118 in enforcing contracts, 115 in employing workers, and 68 in trading across borders (the only factor that the Philippines scored below 100).

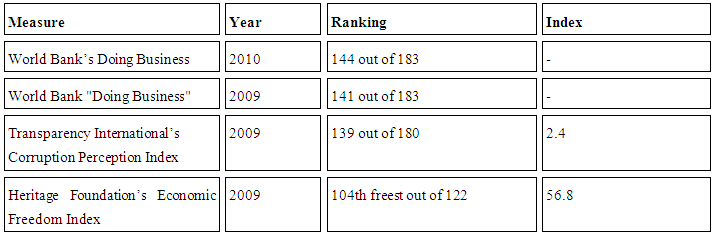
Recently, Third party assessments of the Philippine investment climate statement are included below:

According to these surveys and various other surveys, the investment climate of the Philippines is declining. Philippines are not just the second option or the third option to invest in but rather Philippines lies in the near lower end of the list. Some surveys point out that it may be due to restrictions on starting a business further more it may be due to our legal system on employment, legal contracts or the skill level of our labor force. Others also point corruption as the biggest factor of the decline of foreign investment in our country.

Investment (% of GDP) for Philippines in year 2010 is 15.62%. This makes Philippines No. 150 in world rankings according to Investment (% of GDP) in year 2010. The world's average investment (% of GDP) value is 21.70%; Philippines is 6.08 less than the average. In the previous year, 2009, Investment (% of GDP) for Philippines was 14.65% Investment (% of GDP) for Philippines in 2010 was or will be 6.65% more than it was or will be in 2009.

Balance of Payments 2000-2008 PSY 2010

Philippines is aiming to generate 400 billion pesos (US Dollar 10 billion) in investment commitments in 2013. This figure was 360 billion (US Dollar 8.8 billion) pesos in 2012. US-Philippines Society, a non-profit and independent organization is seeking to raise the profile of the Philippines in the US.

== Philippine laws on investments ==
=== Omnibus Investments Code of 1987: Investment incentives ===
Omnibus Investments Code of 1987, also known as Executive Order No. 226, contains the current investment policies of the Philippines. The government encourages foreign and domestic investments.

Under the Book 1 of the EO 226, enterprises might register under the Board of Investments (BOI) to avail of fiscal investment incentives such as exemption from income taxes, exemption from custom duties and national internal revenue taxes on importation of supplies and spare parts. Moreover, there are non-fiscal incentives such as the permission to employ foreign nationals in supervisory and advisory positions as well as simplification of custom procedures for importation of equipment and exportation of processed products. Of course, investment incentives have restrictions and qualifications. These are the requirements to be qualified for investment incentives:

1. Investing in PIONEER Areas and areas of investments listed in the Investment Priorities Plan (IPP).
2. at least 50% of production is for exports, if Filipino-owned.
3. at least 70% of production is for exports, if majority foreign-owned enterprise (more than 40% foreign equity).

==== Pioneer Areas of Investment ====
An important legislation in Philippine investment is the classification of industries that the government deems to be in need of more investments. The government sets the following standards in order to boost these industries through the privileges aforementioned in the previous section. PIONEER activities can go up to 100% foreign ownership, subject to constitutional and/or statutory limitations. These foreign-owned enterprises should be in at least one of these industries: All these industries should involve the substantial use and processing of domestic raw materials, wherever available.

1. Innovation: Innovative industries that produce goods that are not in commercial sale in the Philippines, or industries that use new and untried systems of production or transformation of any raw material.
2. Social welfare: Agricultural, forestry and mining activities and/or services that are highly essential to the attainment of national goals such as food self-sufficiency and other social benefits.
3. Environment: Environmentally relevant industries that utilize non-conventional fuels and sources of energy in their production.

=== Subic and Clark economic zones ===
These are the Subic and Clark Economic Zones (RA 7227) And Special Economic Zones (RA 7916). During the Ramos administration, the government tried to encourage firms to invest by converting military reservations in Clark and Subic to economic zones for developmental projects in cooperation with private sector companies. In order to incentivize participation, RA 7227 makes Subic a separate customs territory ensuring free flow or movement of goods and capital within, into and exported out of the Subic Special Economic Zone, as well as provide incentives such as tax and duty-free importations of raw materials, capital and equipment. Similarly, the government empowered the Philippine Economic Zone Authority (PEZA) to determine regions and cities that could be considered ECOZONES – these are areas that have a high potential to be developed into agro-industrial, recreational, commercial and investment centers. The government provides defense and security measures, transportation, telecommunications, and other facilities needed to generate linkage with industries and employment opportunities. This aims to promote the flow of local and foreign investors given transformations of areas into developed business centers.

=== Foreign Investments Act of 1991: Republic Act 7042 and Republic Act 8179 ===
Foreign Investments Act (FIA) of 1991 stipulates that foreign ownership in industries can go up to 100%, except those specified in the Foreign Investment Negative List. Industries in the FINL require at least 60% of Filipino ownership, which means that 60% of capital stock outstanding and entitled votes is owned and held by citizens of the Philippines.

== Related Issues on Philippine investments ==
The report on Global Competitiveness for 2010-2011 showed that the evident corruption in the country followed by inefficient government bureaucracy posed to be the most problematic factors hindering business growth or further investments in the country. This was further supported by Asian Development Bank. According to ADB’s report,

the regulatory system is cumbersome, is costly to doing business, and acts as a strong deterrent to investment and productivity growth. Customs and trade regulations are especially burdensome to firms. Customs’ clearing period is longer in the Philippines than in the PRC and Indonesia.

— Improving the Investment Climate in the Philippines.Asian Development Bank.http://www.adb.org/statistics/ics/pdf/PHI-Full-Report.pdf

This just shows the recurring need for better, simpler and more streamlined regulatory procedures so as to reduce the burden on the side of the investors and business sectors, and thus, further improve efficiency and attract more investors. Aside from the bureaucratic problems, the rampant corruption going on almost every level of the government system poses as the most problematic factor hindering growth in business and investments in the country. Despite several lifestyle checking done to curb corruption, ADB stated that the government needs more than just systems to curb corruption; it needs its people to have more political will and commitment to implement the needed reforms and policies for the country.

Moreover, aside from the problems mentioned, the large amount of fiscal incentives provided by the Philippine government to corporations are also seen to be a budding problem. According to a study on fiscal incentives, these large incentives hinder the government from generating revenue from annual taxes from these corporations. Findings also show that these incentives are very costly yet its efficacy on inducing investment was seen to be limited. Some believe that reduction in redundant incentives would yield the government more revenues.
