= Espionage Act of 1941 =

Philippine law

Espionage Act

National Assembly of the Philippines
- Long title: An Act to Punish Espionage and Other Offenses Against the National Security
- Citation: Commonwealth Act No. 616
- Passed: June 4, 1941
- Effective: June 4, 1941
- Status: In force

The Espionage Act of 1941 or Commonwealth Act No. 616 is a Philippine law which criminalizes acts of espionage against the Philippines. Adopted in 1941 by the National Assembly of the Philippines, during the Commonwealth era when the islands were still an American territory, it also covers acts committed against the United States.

Most offenses stipulated in the act apply during wartime.

== History ==
Amendments to the act are being sought in the 2020s for stiffer penalties and expanding the coverage that can be penalized during times of peace. In June 2023, Senate Bill 2368 was filed. In October 2024, House Bill No. 10983 was filed by Rufus Rodriguez of Cagayan de Oro's 2nd district. The House proposal came following allegations of espionage by China which also involves the case of former Bamban mayor Alice Guo.

After the capture of Deng Yuanqing, a Chinese national, for alleged espionage, the National Security Council has urged for the passage of an amendment bill.
