= Wu Duanren =

Chinese businessman

- 吴端仁
- Born: Wu Duanren; August 17, 1980 (age 44); Fujian, China
- Citizenship: Chinese
- Occupation(s): Businessman, police officer (former)
- Years active: 2019–2023 (Philippines operations)

Wu Duanren (Chinese: 吴端仁; born on August 17, 1980, in Fujian, China) is a Chinese businessman in the Philippines.

== Background ==
Wu according to Cassandra Ong was formerly a police officer in China and a government worker.

Wu has been operating in the Philippines since 2019 and is the executive of Whirlwind Corporation. He is alleged to be behind the establishment of Philippine offshore gaming operator (POGO) hubs in various locations in the Philippines. Whirlwind allegedly leased land to Lucky South 99 to set up a POGO hub in Porac, Pampanga.

Zhang Jie is allegedly the president of Lucky South 99 and an associate of Wu. The Straits Times reports that Wu is the chief executive officer and director of Dr Wu Investment Holding in Singapore, a company registered by Zheng.

Wu along with Zheng allegedly facilitated dismissed Bamban mayor's Alice Guo's escape from the Philippines. Guo herself is questioned over her links to POGO operations in her town and her Filipino citizenship. Wu himself was last reported to being in the Philippines on June 11, 2023, and is believed to be based outside the country already.

== Personal life ==
Cassandra Ong has Wu as her baptismal godfather. Ong says that Wu treated him as his own daughter after Ong's mother's death in 2017.
