= 2025 China–Philippines espionage cases =

On January 17, 2025, Philippine law enforcement agents arrested Chinese national Deng Yuanqing, along with two Filipinos, under suspicion of spying for the People's Republic of China. His group was accused of mapping critical infrastructure in the Philippines, including military bases that the United States has access to. Eleven more Chinese nationals were arrested.

Thereafter, China arrested three Filipinos who are former scholars of Hainan Normal University for suspected espionage.

Arrests of other Chinese citizens in the Philippines accused of espionage followed.

== Background ==
During the 2024 Philippine Senate inquiries about Philippine offshore gaming operators (POGOs), it was alleged that Chinese spies have taken advantage of the proliferation of POGOs during the administration of President Rodrigo Duterte. National Intelligence Coordinating Agency deputy director general Francisco Acedillo stated that a Chinese spy network had established itself in the economic and political landscape of the Philippines.

The most notable case prior to the January 2025 spy arrests was that of dismissed Bamban mayor Alice Guo who allegedly had links to the raided POGO hub in her town and was named as a Chinese spy by Thailand-detained self-confessed spy She Zhijiang. POGOs were banned by the end of 2024.

The Philippines and China are also involved in territorial disputes in the South China Sea. The United States' presence in the Philippines and access to Philippine military bases via the Enhanced Defense Cooperation Agreement is seen by China as an affront to Chinese interest.

== Accused by the Philippines ==
=== Suspects ===
==== Deng Yuanqing ====
Deng Yuanqing (Chinese: 鄧元慶) is a software engineer who is a resident of the Philippines. He was arrested and accused of espionage by Philippine enforcement authorities.

According to the Philippine Bureau of Immigration, Deng is married to a Filipino woman and has been travelling in and out of the Philippines since 2013. He is a businessman and a holder of a permanent residence visa due to his marriage. Filipino investigators allege that Deng is affiliated with the People's Liberation Army University of Science and Technology (now the Army Engineering University of the PLA since 2017) in Nanjing, China. Deng's alleged entry into ScholarGPS was cited in the claim.

Deng has a sister, who says he is merely a labor contractor for a driving technology company working on a road-testing project in the Philippines. His wife says his job involves road surveying for self-driving car technology. The director of the Philippines' National Bureau of Investigation (NBI), Jaime Santiago, questioned why the specific name of the company cannot be disclosed.

==== Others ====
Other Chinese nationals have been arrested for spying and had been living in the Philippines since 2003. Three of them are noted to be married to Filipinos.

=== Summary of arrested suspects ===
Name	Age	Arrest	Notes
Deng Yuanqing		January 17 (in Makati)	
Ronel Jojo Besa		January 17 (in Makati)	Filipino drivers of Deng
Jayson Amado Fernandez		January 17 (in Makati)	Filipino drivers of Deng
Cheng Hai Tao (Lestrade)	36	January 24 (in Pasay)	Arrested at the Ninoy Aquino International Airport coming from a flight from Palawan
Wu Cheng Ting (Brawn)	38	January 24 (in Pasay)	Arrested at the Ninoy Aquino International Airport coming from a flight from Palawan
Wang Yong Yi (Watson)	52	January 24 (in Intramuros, Manila)	
Wu Chin Ren	62	January 24 (in Binondo, Manila)	
Cai Shaohuang (Richard Tan Chua)	52	January 25 (in Dumaguete)	Alleged field commander

=== Arrests ===
==== January 17 arrest in Makati ====
The Philippines' NBI became suspicious of a group led by Deng. They suspected that his group was conducting surveillance on critical infrastructures, including military installations. The NBI, with assistance from the Armed Forces of the Philippines (AFP) conducted the arrest of Deng and two suspected Filipino accomplices in a condominium in Makati, Metro Manila on January 17, 2025. Authorities also confiscated a Toyota RAV4 equipped with a GNSS RTK Global Navigation Satellite System and data transmission tools. The detained were presented to the media on January 20, 2025.

The three are facing charges under Section 1(a) and 2(a) of the Commonwealth Act 616 (Espionage Act of 1941), in relation to Republic Act 10175 or the Cybercrime Prevention Act of 2012. Deng pleaded "not guilty" to the charges.

AFP Chief of Staff Romeo Brawner Jr. alleged that Deng's group had been visiting military bases the Philippines granted the United States access to under the Enhanced Defense Cooperation Agreement (EDCA).

Following Deng's arrest, the Philippines' National Security Council (NSC) urged the Congress of the Philippines to pass a bill that would amend the Espionage Act of 1941 to cover more espionage acts during times of peace.

Chinese-Filipino civic leader Teresita Ang See was skeptical about the accusation of Deng, insisting that it is an "iffy conclusion" to say that Deng was committing espionage simply for having "road surveying instruments in his car". She dismissed accusations and speculations against Deng as "conspiracy theories" that only serve to stir tensions in Philippines-China relations. She called for a fair probe on Deng. NBI director Jaime Santiago disputed Ang-See's position that the devices confiscated are commercial-grade purchasable online. He insists that the equipment Deng had, which included a Light Detection and Ranging device, are military-grade.

==== January 24–25 arrests in Palawan ====
The NBI arrested five more suspected Chinese spies from January 24 to 25. They are Cai Shaohuang, Wang Yong Yi, Wu Jun Ren, and Wu Chengting. The five were allegedly working with Deng.

Some of the arrested were posing as Taiwanese tourists in Palawan. They were identified as members of the Qiaoxing Volunteer Group of the Philippines and the Philippine China Association of Promotion of Peace and Friendship.

Philippine President Bongbong Marcos issued a statement of concern that the Chinese could have been utilizing sleeper agents against his country.

==== March 19 arrests in Grande Island ====
On March 19, six Chinese nationals and a Filipino serving as bodyguard were arrested in Grande Island. Philippine authorities stated they were posing as recreational fishers but had been using drones to document American and Philippine naval assets in the area.

=== Alleged targets of Chinese surveillance ===
The suspects are believed by Philippine authorities to be conducting intelligence, surveillance, and reconnaissance (ISR) operations. This includes taking photos and videos of Philippine Coast Guard stations, naval vessels and docks, and high-resolution images of Philippine Navy ships. Their activities around the following had been monitored since 2023:

Target	Type	Location	Notes
Naval Detachment Oyster Bay	Naval base	Ulugan Bay, Puerto Princesa, Palawan	Aerial surveillance and imagery intelligence; From Kahumat-an Beach
Antonio Bautista Air Base	Air base	Puerto Princesa, Palawan	
Buliluyan Port	Seaport	Bataraza, Palawan	Via a CCTV installed at Sun Seas Beach Resort.
Subic Bay International Airport	Airport	Morong, Bataan	Terrain map
Naval Operating Base Subic	Naval base	Subic, Zambales	Terrain map
Philippine Coast Guard – Maritime Safety Service Unit NCR-CL	Coast guard base	Manila	

=== Chinese government response to the arrests ===
The embassy of China in Manila has maintained that the Chinese government always advises its citizens abroad to abide by local laws and regulations. It condemned the characterization of Deng as a Chinese spy and urged the Philippine government to "stick to the facts, stop shadow-chasing" and protect the interests and welfare of Chinese nationals in the Philippines.

=== Other reactions ===
Figures in the Chinese-Filipino community cautioned against sensationalizing the espionage cases while recognizing that the incidents cannot be downplayed. There are concerns that the cases may affect tourism from China and may stow Sinophobia.

== Accused by China ==
=== Filipino Hainan scholars ===
Three Filipinos, two male and one female and who are all from Palawan, were arrested by China on suspicion of espionage. They were beneficiaries of a scholarship program that was a result of a sisterhood agreement between Palawan and the Chinese province of Hainan. Under the 2017 agreement, the Philippine province sent 50 Palaweños to Hainan Normal University from 2018 to 2022. In 2022 the three Filipinos finished their studies and went home to the Philippines, but thereafter returned to China to work after receiving job offers from their friends in Hainan.

The Palawan provincial government has been looking into the case since October 2024. One of the three lost contact with their kin that month, while the other two had not been heard of by their relatives since January 2025.

Chinese state media China Central Television (CCTV) broadcast the alleged confession of the three Filipinos in April 2025. It alleged that the three had been spying for the Philippines since 2021 and received monthly payments to gather information on China's military installations. A "Richie Herrera" working for the Philippine intelligence service was ostensibly the name of the alleged handler of the detained.

In response, the Philippines' NSC issued a statement saying the arrests are a retaliation for the detention of Chinese nationals by Filipino authorities. It has insisted that the three Filipinos are "ordinary Filipino citizens with no military training". It has expressed skepticism about the confession video, noting that the "Philippine Intelligence Agency" or "Philippine Spy Intelligence Services" mentioned are non-existing agencies. The NSC believes that the confession may have been coerced or scripted.

=== Summary of arrested suspects ===
Name	Hometown	Notes
Albert Endencia	Quezon, Palawan	From 2019 scholarship batch, obtained a bachelor's degree in mechanical engineering and automation technology
Nathalie Plizardo	Puerto Princesa	From 2018 scholarship batch, obtained a master's degree in tourism management. Employed in a teaching job in China
David Servañez	Brooke's Point	From 2018 scholarship batch, obtained a bachelor's degree in pharmaceutical engineering

== See also ==
- Alice Guo
- Chinese intelligence activity abroad
