= Joseph Sy =

Businessman in the Philippines

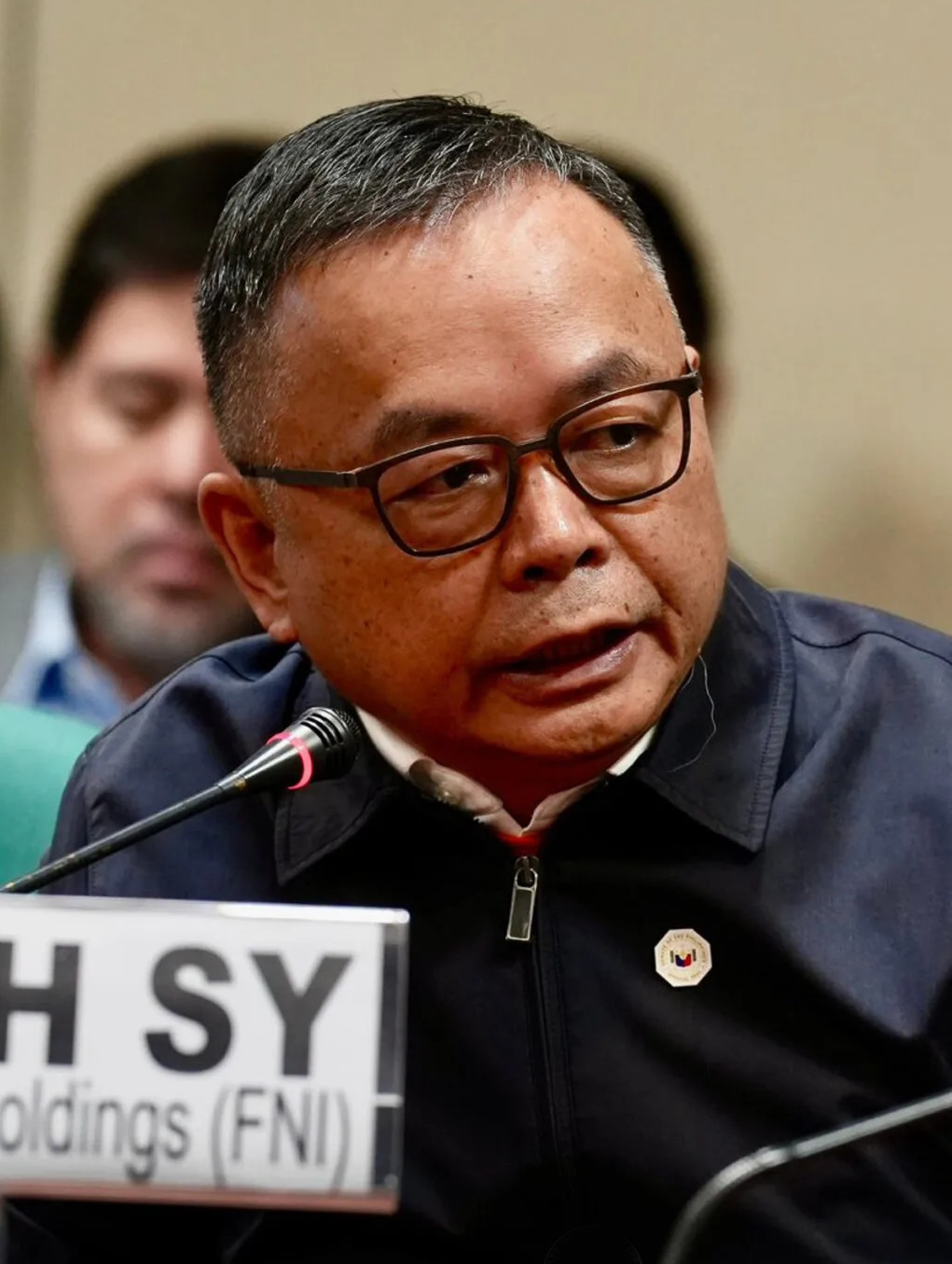
- Sy in 2025
- Born: Joseph Cue Sy; October 10, 1966 (age 60)
- Citizenship: Filipino (disputed)
- Occupation: Businessman
- Known for: Chairman of Global Ferronickel

Joseph Cue Sy is a Filipino businessman who was an executive of Global Ferronickel, a firm involved in nickel mining.

His citizenship was subjected to controversy in 2025, with the Philippine government asserting he falsified his citizenship after his fingerprints allegedly matched that of a Chinese citizen.

== Early life ==
According to a 2015 report, Joseph Cue Sy insisted in an affidavit that he was born in Quezon City on October 10, 1966 to Filipino couple Emilio Toledo Sy and Aida Samson Cue. The provided names of Sy's parents were not available in the Philippine Statistics Authority database and his birth was not registered until December 28, 2007.

== Business career ==
Joseph Sy is best known for his association with nickel mining firm Global Ferronickel, where he served as chairman. Among his milestones is overseeing the first shipment of his business' nickel mine in Brooke's Point, Palawan.

With the help of Dante Bravo, the son-in-law of his associate Agusan del Sur governo Ceferino Paredes Jr., Joseph Sy acquired shares of Platinum Group Metals Corp. Bravo later became president of Global Ferronickel.

In August 2025, Sy stepped down from the role as Global Ferronickel chairman amidst an ongoing citizenship case with Dante R. Bravo taking over.

== Civic involvement ==
Joseph Sy was made part of the Philippine Coast Guard Auxiliary Squadron in 2018 and held the rank of rear admiral. He was later delisted in 2025 following questions over his Philippine citizenship.

== Citizenship issue ==
=== 2010s cases ===
Joseph Sy had a legal case where his Philippine citizenship was disputed filed in 2014 or 2015. During the case, Sy was unable to provide school records, work history or identity documents from before 2007. The matter was dismissed due to lack of evidence.

In 2019, the Supreme Court reversed an earlier Sandiganbayan refusal to grant Sy a travel request to go to China for a business trip. The high court said at the time that there is prima facie evidence supporting Sy's Philippine citizenship and that there is no evidence to the contrary to justify the Sandiganbayan's refusal.

=== 2025 case ===
In August 21, 2025, Joseph Sy was arrested at the Ninoy Aquino International Airport in Metro Manila over accusations of holding false Philippine citizenship. He was detained at the Bureau of Immigration's (BI) facility in Camp Bagong Diwa in Taguig Authorities maintained Sy falsified his citizenship after his fingerprints allegedly matched that of Chen Zhong Zhen, a Chinese citizen born in Fujian on March 29, 1965, who held a long-term visa and an Alien Certificate of Registration. An unspecified Chinese media outlet quoted by Senator Risa Hontiveros identified Sy as Shi Zhenzhong of Donghua village, part of Jinjiang, claiming he had emigrated to the Philippines at age 17. Hontiveros tagged the case an "Alice Guo 2.0", after the mayor of Bamban whose Philippine citizenship was also questioned.

The arrest of Sy was condemned by the Philippine Nickel Industry Association (PNIA) and the Chamber of Mines of the Philippines (COMP) and asked for his immediate release from what they describe as "illegal detention". They insist that the arrest causes a chilling effect to investors.

A Taguig regional trial court ordered the release of Sy on September 5, 2025. However Sy remained in custody of the BI pending an appeal. Sy's son, Johnson Cai Chen is also being investigated by the BI for citizenship issues due to allegedly holding two passports.

Sy first appeared in a Senate inquiry on December 15, 2025 chaired by Risa Hontiveros. He refused to answer questions about his birth and upbringing. He admitted his honorary chairmanship with the Philippine Silk Road Chamber of International Commerce.

The Court of Appeals in February 2026 ruled Sy's detention as illegal, stating that the birth certificate is a prima facie evidence of his Philippine citizenship and is assumed to be valid unless canceled.

Despite of the recommendations in December 2025, the petition to cancel Sy's birth certificate was only referred to the Office of the Solicitor General on March 2, 2026 by the Philippine Statistics Authority (PSA) as the office had to physically verify related documents.

The Supreme Court ordered the release of Sy on October 7, 2026 affirming the CA's ruling and ordered the businessman's release on a bond.
