= Grace Christian College =

Protestant Chinese school in Quezon City, Philippines

- 菲律賓基督教靈惠學院

Location
- Grace Village, Quezon City; Philippines; 14°39′1″N 121°0′18″E

Information
- Former name: Grace Christian High School
- Type: Private
- Motto: Grace and Truth came by Jesus Christ John 1:17
- Established: July 5, 1950
- President: Christine Joy Tan
- Founders: Julia Tan; Edwin Spahr; Helen Spahr
- Enrollment: 2600+
- Language: English, Chinese
- Campus: Urban
- Colors: Maroon, Blue, White
- Website: www.gcc.edu.ph

Chinese name
- Chinese: 菲律賓基督教靈惠學院
- Hanyu Pinyin: Fēilǜbīn Jīdūjiào Línghuì Xuéyuàn
Transcriptions
Standard Mandarin
- Hanyu Pinyin: Fēilǜbīn Jīdūjiào Línghuì Xuéyuàn
Southern Min
- Hokkien POJ: Hui-li̍p-pin Ki-tok-kàu Lêng-hūi Ha̍k-īⁿ

Grace Christian College
- Traditional Chinese: 菲律濱基督教靈惠學院
- Simplified Chinese: 菲律滨基督教灵惠学院
- Hanyu Pinyin: Fēilǜbīn Jīdūjiào Línghuì Xuéyuàn
Transcriptions
Standard Mandarin
- Hanyu Pinyin: Fēilǜbīn Jīdūjiào Línghuì Xuéyuàn
Southern Min
- Hokkien POJ: Hui-li̍p-pin Ki-tok-kàu Lêng-hūi Ha̍k-īⁿ

Grace Christian College (GCC), formerly known as Grace Christian High School (GCHS), is an evangelical Protestant school that caters primarily to Chinese Filipino students and provides education from pre-nursery to college. It is situated in Grace Village, Quezon City, Metro Manila, Philippines.

== History ==
The school formally opened as Grace Christian High School (GCHS) on July 5, 1950 at Nagtahan Street in San Miguel, Manila, by a Chinese educator Julia L. Tan and American Baptist missionaries Edwin and Helen Spahr.

In 1966, GCHS moved to its present location in the newly developed Grace Village, Quezon City, to accommodate an increasing student population while donating the Nagtahan campus to Grace Bible Church for its Christian Academy of Manila. Inauguration for the new campus was held on September 10, 1966. Two years after, the school bought more properties inside Grace Village for further expansion.

In 2008, GCHS was elevated to a tertiary education institution and was renamed as the Grace Christian College.

== Notable alumni ==
- Alfrancis Chua, sports executive and former basketball coach
- Wilson Lee Flores (1983), Filipino writer and real estate entrepreneur
- Win Gatchalian (1991), politician
- Alice Guo, former mayor of Bamban, Tarlac; accused of espionage, and convicted of human trafficking
- Hayden Kho, Filipino aesthetic medicine doctor and media personality
- David Licauco, actor, model
- Bonnie Tan, basketball coach

== Sister schools ==
=== Taiwan ===
- Tam-Kang Senior High School – Tamsui, Taipei
- National Taiwan Normal University– Taipei
- Chung Yuan Christian University – Zhongli District, Taoyuan City
- Chang Jung Christian University – Tainan
- Northern Taiwan Institute of Science and Technology – Kwantu
- Aletheia University – Tamsui, New Taipei City and Madou District, Tainan

=== South Korea ===
- Yumkwang Christian School – Seoul
- Hannam University – Daejon
- Yeodo Private Elementary School – Yeosu, South Jeolla

=== Indonesia ===
- Sekolah Kristen Tri Tunggal (Tri Tunggal Christian School) – Semarang, Central Java

== Gallery ==
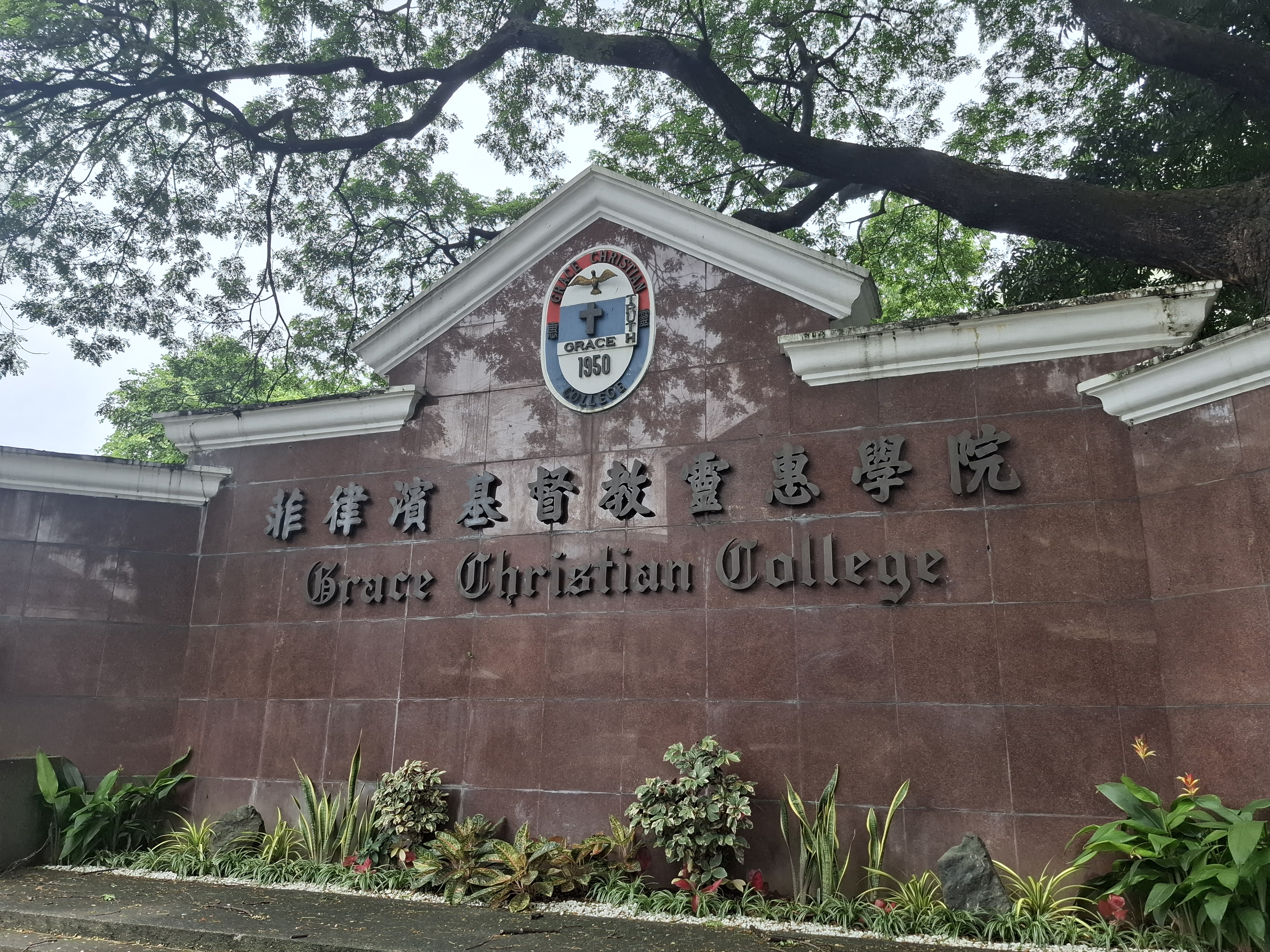
Main Signage of Grace Christian College

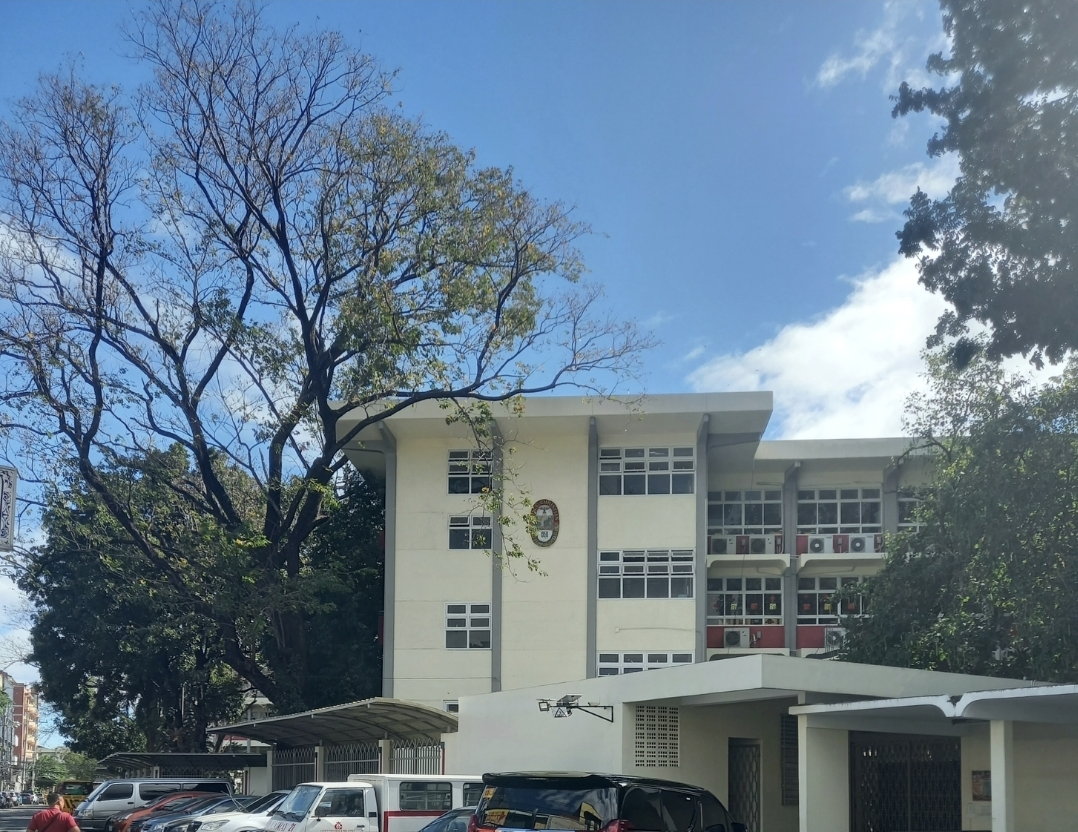
High School Wing Facade
