= Cassandra Ong =

Filipino businesswoman (born 2000)

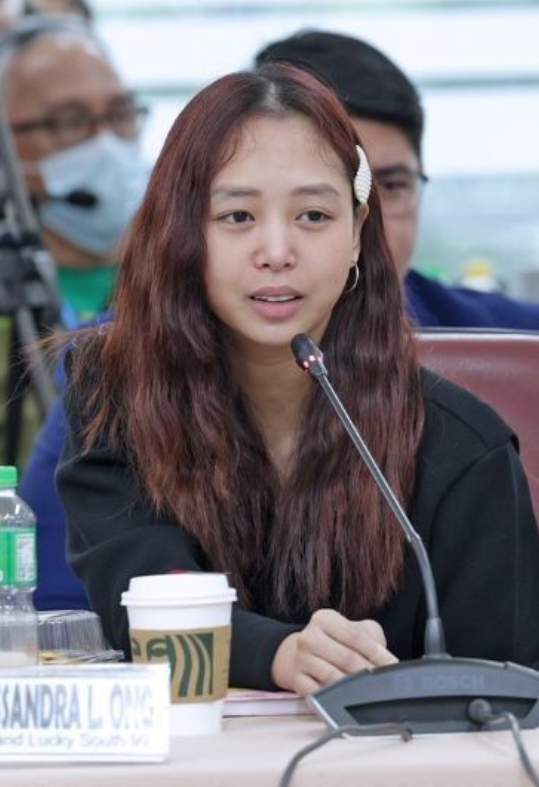
- Ong in 2024
- Born: Katherine Cassandra Li Ong; May 23, 2000 (age 26); San Juan, Philippines
- Citizenship: Filipino
- Occupation: Businesswoman
- Parents: Richard Ong Chao (father); Ying Xia Li (mother)

Katherine Cassandra Li Ong (born May 23, 2000), also nicknamed Cassy Li, is a Filipino fugitive businesswoman who was an associate of Lucky South 99 Outsourcing, Inc., a defunct Philippine offshore gaming operator (POGO) in Porac, Pampanga, that was investigated by authorities for criminal activities committed within its compound. She acted as the "authorized representative" of the company when it acquired its operating license from the Philippine Amusement and Gaming Corporation (PAGCOR) in 2019.

On August 20, 2024, she was apprehended by authorities in Batam, Riau Islands, Indonesia, and was subsequently brought back to the Philippines. Although she has an arrest warrant from an Angeles City Regional Trial Court for qualified human trafficking, and had been in the custody of the House of Representatives in early 2025, authorities later discovered that she had fled to Japan.

The Philippine government has requested that Interpol issue a red notice against Ong.

== Early life ==
Katherine Cassandra Li Ong as per records was born on May 23, 2000, in San Juan, Metro Manila to Chinese parents Richard Ong Chao and Ying Xia Li. Richard Ong Chao sought Filipino citizenship via naturalization in 1978.

According to Cassandra, she was delivered by a hilot after which she was brought to the Chinese General Hospital in Manila. Irregularities were found about the listed address in her birth certificate, particularly the house number which Senator and former San Juan Mayor Jinggoy Estrada insist to be non-existent.

During a July 2024 hearing by the House Committee on Public Order and Safety, Undersecretary Gilbert Cruz of the Presidential Anti–Organized Crime Commission (PAOCC) informed the committee that Ong was not a true Filipino citizen based on the evidence they gathered, with her parents availing a late registration of birth for her in 2001. However, PAOCC spokesperson Winston Casio corrected the conclusion a month later and stated that her Filipino citizenship is authentic. Her actual date of birth was initially unclear, with PAOCC previously determining it to be around the late 1980s to early 1990s.

After her mother's death in December 2017, Ong claimed that she was taken in by her "godfather" Wu Duanren, a Chinese policeman-turned-businessman. Wu has been cited as a top executive at Lucky South 99.

== Education ==
Ong's educational background is also disputed. During the House quad-committee hearing on September 19, 2024, she claimed to have studied at Manila Patriotic School in Santa Cruz, Manila but did not finish her elementary education. She also denied attending high school in China or elsewhere, despite being shown a photo of herself in a graduation toga, which she attributed to her participation in the Department of Education's Alternative Learning System (ALS). Ong insisted that she only attended a few sessions of ALS and expressed uncertainty about her registration.

== Career ==
=== Early business career ===
Ong previously owned a milk tea shop in San Juan, Metro Manila, before moving to Pampanga around 2019 or 2020. There, she opened a pet-friendly aesthetic center and is rumored to own a café restaurant and resort in Angeles City.

=== Activities with Lucky South 99 ===
Ong is an incorporator of the real estate firm Whirlwind Corp., of which she owned 58% of its shares. The firm leased a 10-hectare (25-acre) land within the Grand Palazzo Royale in Porac, Pampanga to the POGO company Lucky South 99 Outsourcing, Inc. (formerly called Xinsheng IT Start-Up). Ong sent a letter of no objection (LONO) to the municipal hall of Porac to permit the operation of Lucky South 99, which was approved in November 2019. A license to operate was granted to Lucky South 99 by PAGCOR in 2020, which was valid until October 2023.

Whirlwind hired former presidential spokesperson Harry Roque as a lawyer, with Roque accompanying Ong in visiting PAGCOR on July 26, 2023, to assist in settling Lucky South 99's arrears to PAGCOR. He also acted on the sole behalf of Ong in his multiple calls to a PAGCOR executive to inquire about the remaining necessary documents to be filed for Lucky South 99. According to Roque, Ong became Whirlwind's Corporate Secretary in September 2023, and in the same month had him accompany her in reapplying Lucky South 99 for an Internet Gaming License (IGL) from PAGCOR. By May 22, 2024, PAGCOR sent a letter to Ong denying the IGL application due to alleged illegal activities that occurred in the establishment in 2022.

In early June 2024, police authorities from various organizations arrived at Lucky South 99 to rescue the remaining victims within the compound despite a limited search warrant.

Ong is listed as the owner of a lavish mansion in a 2.2-hectare (5.4-acre) compound in Porac, which was raided by police on July 6, 2024.

=== Post-Lucky South 99 closure ===
On August 1, 2024, PAGCOR chairman Alejandro Tengco revealed that Ong had fled to Singapore, according to information received by police authorities.

On August 9, 2024, three people separately filed charges against 13 officers of Lucky South 99, including Ong, for identity theft and falsification of documents due to the inclusion of the petitioners' names in corporate documents without their knowledge. On August 16, four committees of the House of Representatives (i.e., Dangerous Drugs, Public Order and Safety, Human Rights, and Public Accounts) together issued a contempt order against Ong for failing to attend their legislative inquiries. She was cited in contempt once again by the committee on September 20 for "lying" and ordered detained at the Correctional Institute for Women in Mandaluyong for 30 days beginning on September 26.

By August 20, Ong was captured alongside Shiela Guo at Mega Mall Batam Center in Batam, Indonesia by local authorities, and subsequently placed in the custody of the Directorate General of Immigration. Two days later, they were brought back to the Philippines to be placed in the custody of the National Bureau of Investigation (NBI).

On August 30, the Anti–Money Laundering Council, Presidential Anti–Organized Crime Commission, and the National Bureau of Investigation filed a money laundering case against Ong, Alice Guo, and 32 others before the Department of Justice (DOJ).

On September 10, Ong and 51 others were charged with qualified human trafficking at the DOJ for their alleged involvement in the Lucky South 99 POGO operations. On September 26, Ong was moved at the Correctional Institution for Women (CIW) in Mandaluyong.

On October 29, Harry Roque was included as co-respondent by the PAOCC and the PNP-CIDG in the non-bailable qualified Anti-Trafficking in Persons Act of 2003 case.

In May 2025, the Pampanga Regional Trial Court Branch 118 issued warrants of arrest against Ong and others for qualified human trafficking. In June 2025, a petition by Ong against the indictment was dismissed by the Court of Appeals.

However as per reports in November 2025, Ong was released from the CIW sometime during the transition from the 19th to 20th Congress in mid-2025.

Ong's whereabouts is undetermined. The PAOCC said it last tracked Ong to have flew to Japan in January 2025. On December 2, the Philippine government claims Ong remains in the Philippines, but Interior Secretary Jonvic Remulla claims Ong has fled to Fujian, China.

== Personal life ==
Ong's boyfriend is Wesley Guo, brother of Alice Guo, a former mayor of Bamban, Tarlac who was dismissed from the position by the Ombudsman for "grave misconduct" over another case involving POGOs.
