= FNI =

FNI may refer to:

- Fania language, spoken in Chad
- Fellow of the Nautical Institute
- Frankfurt Niederrad station, in Germany
- Friday Nite Improvs
- Fridtjof Nansen Institute, a Norwegian research institute
- Global Ferronickel also known as FNI
- International Naturist Federation (French: Fédération naturiste internationale)
- National Car Registration Record (French: Fichier National des Immatriculations), the 1950-2009 French car registration system.
- Nationalist and Integrationist Front (French: Front des Nationalistes et Intégrationnistes), a rebel group in the Democratic Republic of the Congo
- Nîmes–Alès–Camargue–Cévennes Airport, in France
