= 2023 Singapore money laundering case =

2023 criminal investigation

- Date: 15 August 2023 (raids)
- Location: Singapore
- Type: Money laundering scheme
- Accused: 10
- Convicted: 10

On 15 August 2023, the Singapore Police Force conducted an operation against money laundering. It is the biggest money laundering case in Singapore, and among the biggest in the world, involving assets worth 3 billion SGD.

Initially, only 1 billion Singapore dollars worth of assets was either seized, frozen or issued prohibition of disposal orders although the value of assets involved would later balloon to 3 billion Singapore dollars. Ten foreigners were arrested and charged for money laundering related crimes, all of whom were Chinese nationals from Minnan region who are also holders of various non-Chinese passports. Another 17 people are also currently on the run and are wanted by the Singaporean authorities for their alleged involvement in this case.

This case has been linked to unlicensed money lending in China, scams, and remote online gambling operations in the Philippines, which also saw Alice Guo, a mayor in the Philippines, being temporarily stripped of authority.

Authorities were first alerted to the scheme as early as 2021.

== Timeline of events ==
- 2021 - Authorities were first alerted to the money laundering scheme.
- 15 August 2023 - The 10 accused in this case are arrested. Assets worth over 1 billion Singapore Dollars were either seized, frozen or issued prohibition of disposal orders, including vehicles, Bearbricks, properties, luxury items, grand pianos, liquor and wine.
- 16 August 2023 - The 10 accused in this case are charged in court.
- 25 October 2023 - Four cars belonging to one of the ten accused in this case are impounded and towed out. At the same time, Singaporean police officers confiscated Bearbricks linked to one of the accused in the same case.
- 2 April 2024 - 32-year-old Su Wenqiang pleaded guilty to 2 money laundering charges. He was also the first of the 10 accused to plead guilty. He was sentenced to 13 months in jail and also forfeited assets worth over $5.9 million to the state. Two days after his sentencing, the ICA confirmed that Su would be deported after his release from prison and also be banned from re-entering Singapore.
- 4 April 2024 - 41-year-old Su Haijin pleaded guilty to one charge of resisting arrest and two money laundering charges. He was also the second of the 10 accused to plead guilty. He was sentenced to 14 months in jail and also forfeited assets worth over $165 million to the state.
- 16 April 2024 - 32-year-old Wang Baosen pleaded guilty to two charges of money laundering. He was the third of the 10 accused to plead guilty. He was sentenced to 13 months in jail and also forfeited assets worth over $8 million to the state.
- 29 April 2024 - 42-year-old Su Baolin pleaded guilty to one count of falsifying his representations to the Inland Revenue Authority of Singapore (Iras) and two counts of money laundering. He was sentenced to 14 months in jail and also forfeited assets worth over $65 million to the state.
- 30 April 2024 - 45-year-old Zhang Ruijin pleaded guilty to one money laundering charge and two forgery charges. He was sentenced to 15 months in jail and also forfeited assets worth over $118 million to the state.
- 14 May 2024 - 43-year-old Vang Shuiming pleaded guilty to two counts of money laundering and one count of submitting a forged document to a bank. He was sentenced to 13 months and six weeks in jail and also forfeited assets worth over $180 million to the state.
- 23 May 2024 - 34-year-old Chen Qingyuan pleaded guilty to one count of forgery and two counts of money laundering. He was sentenced to 15 months in jail and also forfeited assets worth over $21.3 million to the state.
- 30 May 2024 - the only female defendant of the case, 44-year-old Lin Baoying pleaded guilty to one count of money laundering and two counts of submitting a forged document to a bank. She was sentenced to 15 months in jail and also forfeited assets worth over S$153 million to the state.
- 6 June 2024 - 36-year-old Su Jianfeng became the ninth person to be convicted after pleading guilty to money laundering and forgery. The prosecution sought a sentence of 17 to 18 months’ jail, stating that the intention of pleading guilty came only at the latest stage after eight of the offenders were sentenced, and it was not a sign of true contrition or remorse coming from Su, whose case had spent a considerably large number of public resources, and no discount should be given to Su in terms of his sentence given the lateness of his plea of guilt. His sentencing was adjourned to 13 June 2024.
- 7 June 2024 - the tenth and final accused, 35-year-old Wang Dehai, pleaded guilty to one count of money laundering. Wang, who was Su Wenqiang's cousin, was sentenced to 16 months in jail and also forfeited assets worth over $49 million to the state.
- 13 June 2024 - Su Jianfeng was sentenced to 17 months in jail, the longest sentence meted out by the courts in this present case. He also forfeited assets worth over $178.9 million to the state.
- 15 August 2024 - 2 ex-bank employees and a former driver of one of the wanted, Su Binghai, are charged in court.
- 18 November 2024 - 15 of the 17 people still wanted by the Singapore Police for their involvement in this money laundering case agreed to surrender $1.85b in assets. This is in addition to $944 million in assets previously surrendered by the 10 who were convicted and jailed, taking the total value of assets surrendered to $2.8 billion. Those suspects were also banned from entering Singapore.
- 4 July 2025 - The Monetary Authority of Singapore (MAS) imposes S$27.45 million in penalties on nine financial institutions for breaches of AML requirements in relation to the case.

== Deportation of the convicts ==
On 6 May 2024, both Wang Baosen and Su Wenqiang were released from prison on parole for good behaviour, and deported from Singapore. The two men were deported to Cambodia given that they carried Cambodian passports, but Su faced the possibility of deportation to China, where he had been on the wanted list since 2017 for illegal online gambling.

On 1 June 2024, Vang Shuiming was deported to Japan after he was given parole and released from jail. Su Haijin and Su Baolin were both similarly deported on the same date, but to Cambodia.

On 16 June 2024, three days after the sentencing of Su Jianfeng, ICA revealed that after completing their jail terms and receiving parole, three of the convicted money launderers - Zhang Ruijin, Chen Qingyuan and Lin Baoying - had been deported to Cambodia the day before on 15 June, and they had been barred from re-entering Singapore.

On 6 July 2024, Wang Dehai served 11 months out of his 16-month prison sentence before he was released on parole, and was deported to the United Kingdom.

On 16 July 2024, Zhang Ruijin was deported from Cambodia. He had been deported to Cambodia after serving his jail sentence in Singapore.

On 26 July 2024, after his release on parole for good behaviour, Su Jianfeng was deported to Cambodia, therefore becoming the last of the 10 convicted to be deported and be barred from re-entering Singapore.

== See also ==
- List of major crimes in Singapore
- Minnan region
- Minnan people
- Minnan culture
