= Teresita Ang-See =

Filipino civic leader and activist (born 1949)

- 洪玉華
- Born: December 25, 1949 (age 76); Manila, Philippines
- Spouse: Chinben See (m. 1975; died 1986)

Teresita Barraca Ang-See (Chinese: 洪玉華; pinyin: Hong Yuhua) is Filipino civic leader and activist who focuses on issues affecting the Chinese Filipino community.

== Early life and education ==
Teresita Ang See or Hong Yuhua was born in Manila, Philippines, on December 25, 1949. She had a father who is a Chinese immigrant from Fukien (now Fujian) and a Filipino-citizen mother. She had eleven siblings. Her father Jose Ang moved to Manila as eight-year-old child to work in a restaurant in Divisoria while her mother Carmen Davenport Barraca is a college-educated Filipino-American mestiza. Teresita's parents married during the Japanese occupation of the Philippines. She spent her early years in Malabon.

Teresita's father died at age 44, when the eldest child was still 16 years old and the wife is still pregnant with the eleventh child. Her mother worked as a cigarette factory worker and as a seamstress while all eleven children also contributed to the family livelihood.

The Ang See family moved to Binondo in Manila, which led to Teresita's enrollment to the Chiang Kai-shek College. She is already a working student at the time.

For her tertiary education she attended the University of the Philippines Diliman amidst the First Quarter Storm. Under old Philippine nationality law, Ang See was a Chinese citizen by virtue of her father's citizenship preventing her to openly participate in protests due to risked to getting deported to China. She has no close relatives in China. It was only when she reached 18 years old when she elected to be a Filipino citizen which is possible through her maternal parentage.

She pursued graduate studies at the University of the Philippines Asian Center, a unit within UP Diliman.

== Career ==
After her graduate studies, Ang See joined the Federation Of Filipino Chinese Chambers Of Commerce & Industry (FFCCCI) as a research assistant.

=== Formation of Kaisa and Martial Law era ===
She joined the Pagkakaisa sa Pag-unlad. Pagkakaisa was founded in 1971, a group which advocated for jus soli citizenship of ethnic Chinese and their integration in mainstream Philippine society. Pagkakaisa was dissolved in 1976 during Martial law era under president and dictator Ferdinand Marcos after it was tagged as a Communist front.

Revival efforts of the organization started after the assassination of Ninoy Aquino in 1983 which eventually became known as the Kaisa Para sa Kaunlaran. She and her husband Chin Ben See translated material critical to the Marcos administration sourced from the "mosquito press" which they clandestinely distributed. This was done to encourage dissent against the Marcos administration among the Chinese Filipino community which has a reputation to be apolitical.

Ang See supported Corazon Aquino in the 1986 Philippine snap presidential election against the incumbent Marcos. Kaisa was formally re-established in August 1987.

=== Other actions ===
==== Anti-kidnapping and crime ====
In the early 1990s, kidnapping was a significant issue among the Chinese Filipino community. Kaisa founded the Movement for Restoration of Peace and Order (MPRO) in January 1993, an effort against kidnap for ransom crime in the country. They mobilize a funeral attended by at least one hundred thousand for the teenage victim Charlene Sy. The Citizens Action Against Crime was also organized.

==== Alice Guo citizenship issue ====
Ang criticized the line of questioning around the Senate inquiry on Alice Guo's citizenship and involvement in Philippine Offshore Gaming Operator (POGO) which she described as a "zarzuela". She pointed out that Guo's language proficiency or the lack of thereof is not an indicator of her citizenship. She also noted Sinophobia against Chinese Filipinos resulting from the buzz.

==== Chinese espionage allegation ====
Ang was critical of deliberation of politicians and reports of the media over the significant amount of Chinese students enrolled in Cagayan in 2024. She says that suggestions that the students are spies is "dangerous and unfortunate" and is a manifestation of Sinophobia and racism.

Chinese national Deng Yuanqing was detained by Philippine authorities in January 2025 for allegedly mapping sensitive military sites in Luzon. Ang was skeptical on about the accusation and insist its an "iffy conclusion" that Deng was committing espionage just because he has "road surveying instruments in his car". She dismissed accusations and speculations against Deng as "conspiracy theories" that only serves to stir tensions on Philippines-China relations. She called for a fair probe with Deng's sister saying he is just a labor contractor for a driving technology company working on a road-testing project in the Philippines.

== Personal life ==
Ang See was married Chinben See, an ethnic Chinese scholar and anthropologist who is a co-founder of Kaisa. Their marriage lasted from 1975 to 1986 when Chinben died of liver cancer.

== Honors and awards ==
- 2005 Volunteer Lifetime Achievement Awardee
- 2021 Award for Promoting Philippines–China Understanding (Outstanding Contributions) from the Philippines-China Understanding (APCU) and the Chinese Embassy in Manila for her role Kaisa Para sa Kaunlaran founder
