= Global Ferronickel =

Global Ferronickel Holdings, Inc.
- Type: Public
- Traded as: PSE: FNI
- Industry: Mining
- Founded: May 3, 1994; 32 years ago
- Headquarters: Parañaque, Metro Manila, Philippines
- Area served: China, Indonesia
- Key people: Joseph Sy (chairman (Note: Sy is on voluntary leave due to questions over his Filipino citizenship)); Dante Bravo (president and chairman); Morales Ocsebio Investment Holdings, Ent.
- Website: gfni.com.ph

Global Ferronickel Holdings, Inc. also known as FNI (stylized as FNi) is a Philippine nickel mining company which operates mines in Surigao del Norte and Palawan.

== History ==
Global Ferronickel Holdings, Inc. was incorporated on May 3, 1994. In 2006, FNI opened its nickel mine at Cagdianao. It operates under FNI's subsidiary Platinum Group Metals Corporation (PGMC).

In August 2015, FNI acquired Southern Palawan Nickel Ventures Inc. (SPNVI) and consequentially the Ipilan mine in Brooke's Point, Palawan. This made FNI as the second largest producer of nickel in the Philippines after Nickel Asia.

In May 2017, Brooke's Point mayor Jean Feliciano shut down the Ipilan mine after the Department of Environment and Natural Resources (DENR) revoked the FNI's environmental compliance certificate (ECC). Feliciano went on to demolish structures at the Ipilan mine despite an ongoing appeal. The Ombudsman suspended Feliciano for a year in 2021 for grave abuse of authority. Operations was resumed.

== Mining operations ==
In 2024, China is the top market destination for FNI accounting for 93 percent of the company's revenue. Indonesia is the next top destination at 7 percent. FNI has also exported nickel to Australia.

FNI operates the following mines:

- Cagdianao Nickel Mine – Claver, Surigao del Norte
- Ipilan Nickel Mine – Brooke's Point, Palawan
