= Alice Guo =

Mayor of Bamban, Philippines, from 2022 to 2024

- 郭華萍
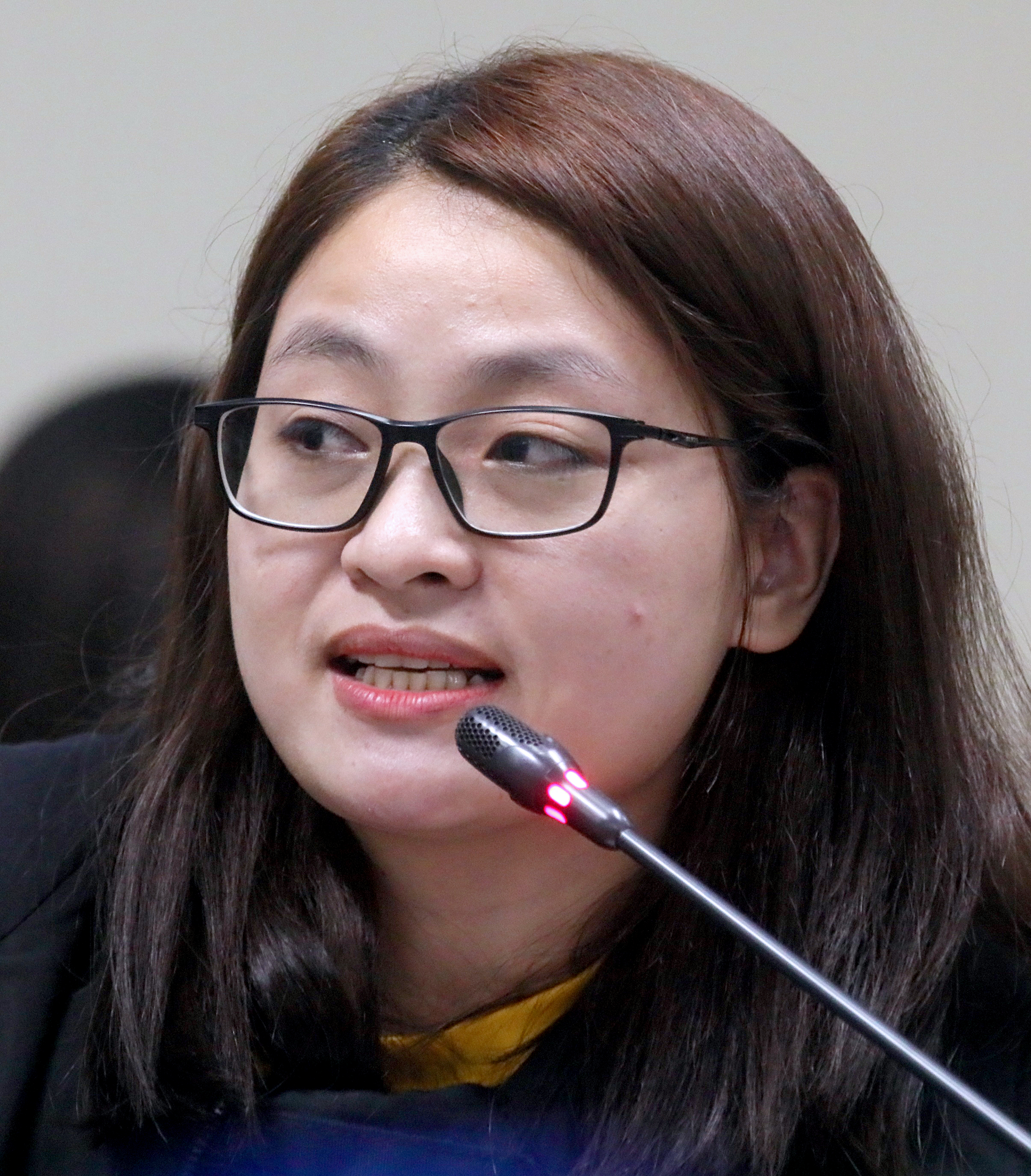
- Guo in 2024

Mayor of Bamban, Tarlac
- De facto (Note: Guo's tenure was nullified on June 27, 2025, after she was ruled to be a Chinese citizen and hence ineligible to hold public office.)
- In office June 30, 2022 – August 13, 2024 (Note: Suspended from June 3, 2024, to August 13, 2024, when she was dismissed by the Ombudsman)
- Vice Mayor: Leonardo Anunciacion
- Preceded by: Jose Antonio Feliciano
- Succeeded by: Erano Timbang (acting)

Personal details
- Born: Guo Hua Ping; August 31, 1990 (age 36) (Note: Guo's date of birth was disputed in 2024.) Jinjiang, Fujian, China
- Citizenship: Chinese (publicly claimed to be Filipino until disputed in 2024; birth certificate voided in September 2025)
- Party: Independent (until 2023; 2024–present)
- Other political affiliations: NPC (2023–2024)
- Parents: Guo Jian Zhong (father); Lin Wen Yi (mother)
- Occupation: Businesswoman; politician
- Criminal information
- Status: Incarcerated
- Conviction: Qualified human trafficking
- Penalty: Life imprisonment; ₱2 million fine

Details
- Date apprehended: September 3, 2024
- Imprisoned at: Correctional Institution for Women, Mandaluyong (since December 2025)

Chinese name
- Simplified Chinese: 郭华萍
- Traditional Chinese: 郭華萍
Transcriptions
Standard Mandarin
- Hanyu Pinyin: Guō Huápíng
- Bopomofo: ㄍㄨㄛ ㄏㄨㄚˊ ㄆㄧㄥˊ
- Wade–Giles: Kuo1 Hua2-p'ing2
- IPA: [kwó xwǎpʰǐŋ]
Southern Min
- Hokkien POJ: Keh Hôa-phêng
- Tâi-lô: Keh Huâ-phîng

Alice Leal Guo (Chinese: 郭華萍 (Note: As written by World News, a Binondo-based Chinese-language newspaper. The name is transliterated in pinyin as Guō Huápíng. However, this information is independent of the allegations made in 2024 that Guo is the same person as a Chinese citizen named Guo Hua Ping.); pinyin: Guō Huápíng; Wade–Giles: Kuo^{¹} Hua^{²}-p'ing^{²}; IPA: [kwó xwǎpʰǐŋ]; born August 31, 1990) is a Chinese businesswoman and former politician in the Philippines who served as the de facto mayor of Bamban, Tarlac, from June 30, 2022, to August 13, 2024. She was convicted of human trafficking in November 2025 and sentenced to life imprisonment.

Guo became the subject of national controversy in 2024 following investigations into her alleged involvement in illegal Philippine offshore gaming operator (POGO) activities in Bamban. She was suspended and subsequently dismissed as mayor by the Ombudsman over graft charges related to her alleged connections with POGO operations. She was dismissed by the Ombudsman on August 13, 2024. In a Senate committee inquiry following the raids in Bamban in 2023 and 2024, senators Risa Hontiveros and Sherwin Gatchalian alleged that she had links to illegal POGO activities. Her Filipino citizenship was also questioned amid inconsistencies in her documents and testimony. Allegations that she was a Chinese spy also emerged, although The Economist described these allegations as unlikely to be true.

In July 2024, Guo's assets were frozen, and an arrest order was issued against her. She fled the Philippines on July 17 and traveled through Malaysia and Singapore before arriving in Indonesia, where she was arrested on September 3 and deported to the Philippines two days later. In March 2025, she was on trial in six separate cases that could lead to decades in prison and had been barred from running for public office again. She pleaded not guilty to human trafficking charges. In June 2025, a Manila Regional Trial Court ruled that she was a Chinese citizen and declared her election and assumption of the mayorship void ab initio.

== Early life and background ==
=== Birth and ancestry ===
Details of Guo's early life and educational background are disputed. Guo stated that she was born at her home, whose location she does not recall, or, according to her birth certificate, in Barangay Matatalaib in the then-municipality of Tarlac, Philippines, on August 31, 1990, originally thought to be July 12, 1986; her family's Special Investors Resident Visa (SIRV) application documents placed her birthplace at Jinjiang, Fujian, China. (Note: Attributed to multiple references:) The National Bureau of Investigation (NBI) also revealed the existence of three individuals named Alice Leal Guo, all born on July 12, 1986. One of these individuals has a different physical appearance from her. Residents at the reported address of the second Alice Guo in Quezon City stated they were unaware of anyone named Alice Guo residing there. The NBI later confirmed that the fingerprints of Mayor Alice Guo and Chinese national Guo Hua Ping matched, confirming that they are the same person.

Guo asserts her father's ethnicity as Chinese and states he was 70 years old as of 2024, but discrepancies about his citizenship are evident from various documents. His birth certificate identifies him as Filipino, named Angelito Guo, while his business records list him as a Chinese citizen named Jian Zhong Guo, born in 1958. Guo's mother's identity is also in question; she is either a Filipino housemaid named Amelia Leal Guo, as per Guo's claim and birth certificate, or a Chinese businesswoman named Lin Wen Yi (born 1971), based on sources in Valenzuela and the Guo family's SIRV application documents. Guo claimed to be her father's illegitimate child with Amelia, resulting in her being raised by her father in seclusion on a pig farm in Tarlac City. However, discrepancies arose when the birth certificates of Guo, Chinese national Zhang Mier alias Shiela Leal Guo (born 1984), and Seimen Leal Guo (born 1988 or 1990) revealed discrepancies in the ages of Angelito and Amelia Guo at their children's births, along with two differing marriage dates in Tarlac. Furthermore, the couple was found to have no existing birth and marriage records in the Philippine Statistics Authority. Jian Zhong Guo and Lin Wen Yi are co-incorporators in multiple businesses with Guo, claiming the same address in Quezon City according to Securities and Exchange Commission (SEC) and Bureau of Internal Revenue (BIR) records. Guo had initially denied that Lin was her biological mother and insisted that Amelia exists, but later admitted that Jian Zhong Guo is her father. She categorically denied Lin Wen Yi to be her mother.

Guo initially denied knowing Shiela and Seimen Guo, but Bureau of Immigration (BI) records suggest they had traveled abroad together. She later confirmed them as her paternal half-siblings, despite their birth certificates suggesting they are full siblings. However, both Guo and Shiela later separately denied being biological sisters, with Shiela claiming that Jian Zhong Guo is her foster father. It was later revealed that Guo has another full sibling named Wesley (born 1990, also known as Guo Xiang Dian according to the NBI) and reportedly five more siblings.

In July 2024, Solicitor-General Menardo Guevarra filed a petition to cancel the birth certificate for Guo issued by the Philippine Statistics Authority (PSA), following doubts raised about her origins and citizenship. On October 4, 2024, Guo's Philippine passport was cancelled by the Department of Foreign Affairs, citing fraudulent circumstances in its acquisition.

On December 17, 2024, Guo, her parents, and her two siblings were sued by the NBI before the Department of Justice (DOJ) for falsification and violation of the Anti-Dummy Law on foreign land ownership. The NBI alleged that the Guos falsely claimed Filipino citizenship and residency to acquire four parcels of land in Mangatarem, Pangasinan. On September 24, 2025, Guo's birth certificate was cancelled by the Tarlac City Regional Trial Court Branch 111.

=== Education and childhood ===
Some residents of Bamban, including those from Barangay Virgen de los Remedios, said that Guo lived and grew up there, adding that she also has a sibling. Guo has stated that her family raised pigs for a living and that she grew up on a farm. She also claimed to have spent her teenage life in Concepcion, Tarlac. Furthermore, registration records of her companies showed that she had residency in Marilao, Bulacan, and Valenzuela, Metro Manila, citing her parents' embroidery business in the latter. However, it was revealed that no such business existed, and her listed home address in Valenzuela belonged to a certain Bayle family, according to Senator Win Gatchalian.

Guo stated during a testimony at a joint Philippine Senate Committee investigation that she was homeschooled. However, her birth was only registered on November 22, 2005, casting doubts on her early life due to the absence of hospital birth records, her inability to identify her homeschool provider, and traditional educational records, prompting inquiries into the nature of her education. It was later revealed that Guo attended Grace Christian High School (now Grace Christian College) from 2000 to 2003, covering Grades 1 to 3, according to her school enrollment forms. According to one of her classmates, she was known by her Chinese name, attended special classes for Filipino subjects, took a higher grade level for her Chinese classes, and completed the Chinese curriculum despite struggling with English.

Her failure to recall details of her birth and early life during the Senate inquiry led to online ridicule, with Guo being dubbed My Amnesia Girl (a Philippine romantic comedy film from 2010) in a popular meme.

=== Residency and citizenship ===
According to Guo's Certificate of Candidacy for Mayor filed before the Commission on Elections (COMELEC) in 2021, she declared herself unmarried and claimed lifelong residency in the Philippines, residing at her registered address in Bamban for 18 years by that time. It was revealed that she registered as a voter of Bamban in April 2021, just 13 months before the 2022 general elections, while COMELEC spokesperson John Rex Laudiangco said that she had registered in 2018. She also claimed to have held a Philippine passport, the only one she possesses, since she was between 17 and 19 years old, around 2003 to 2005. Her family's SIRV application documents indicate that, as Guo Hua Ping, she also holds a Chinese passport and migrated to the Philippines on January 12, 2003, at the age of 12. On August 6, 2024, the COMELEC approved the filing of a criminal complaint on misrepresentation grounds against Guo after an investigation found that her fingerprints matched those of Guo Hua Ping. The complaint was formally presented before a court in Tarlac on October 28, 2024.

== Business career ==
Before venturing into politics, Guo has an extensive background as a businesswoman, serving as an incorporator and holding significant shares in at least 11 companies since 2010, according to Securities and Exchange Commission records.

=== Air taxi venture ===
In the 2024 Senate inquiry, Guo admitted to owning a helicopter, which she acquired in 2019 and sold in 2024 to an undisclosed British firm. She said she meant to use the helicopter for an air taxi business but was compelled to sell the aircraft after the venture did not meet their expectations.

=== Car dealership ===
Westcars Incorporated is one of the businesses affiliated with Guo. It is a car dealership registered on March 16, 2016. Senator Risa Hontiveros, in the 2024 Senate inquiry, has alleged that Guo owns 16 vehicles, which include sports utility vehicles, vans, and trucks, which Guo reasoned are associated with the Westcars venture.

=== Involvement in POGOs ===
Now closed Baofu Land Development compound, a POGO hub in Bamban.

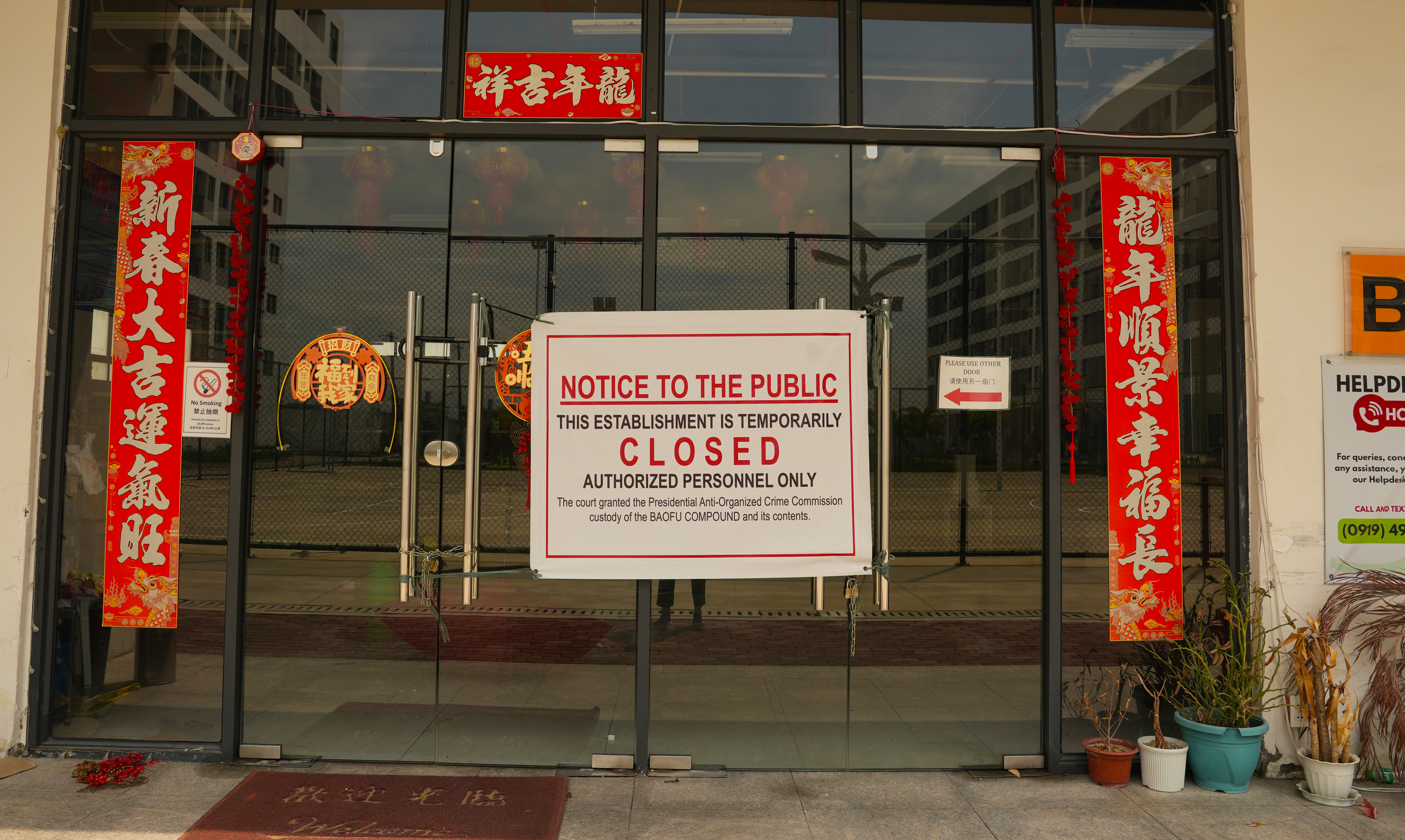
Notice of closure in Baofu Land Development's compound in Bamban.

Starting in June 2024, Guo faced cases in the Senate, the DOJ, the Ombudsman, and the courts. Senator Win Gatchalian revealed Guo's alleged links with the firm Zun Yuan Technology, Inc., an online casino firm that was registered in the Philippines as a Philippine Offshore Gaming Operator (POGO). Prior to her election in 2022, Guo had applied for the license of Hongsheng Gaming Technology, Inc.; and in late 2020, the Bamban municipal council approved its establishment and operation. Hongsheng had its license to operate cancelled by the Philippine Amusement and Gaming Corporation (PAGCOR) by 2022. In 2019, Baofu Land Development was incorporated by Guo, Zhang Ruijin, and Lin Baoying, with Rachel Joan Malonzo Carreon and a Cypriot national, Huang Zhiyang. Furthermore, Guo was reportedly spotted with a Bulgari Serpenti Viper necklace worth ₱11.9 million (US$203,000), a Louis Vuitton silk shirt, and a Chanel bag.

The POGO hub is situated in the property which is owned by Baofu Land Development, Inc. and is located behind the municipal building in Barangay Anupul, Bamban, was twice raided by the authorities: in February 2023, for alleged involvement in cryptocurrency investment scams; and in March 2024, due to allegations of human trafficking and other cybercrimes; at that time, it had been renamed Zun Yuan.

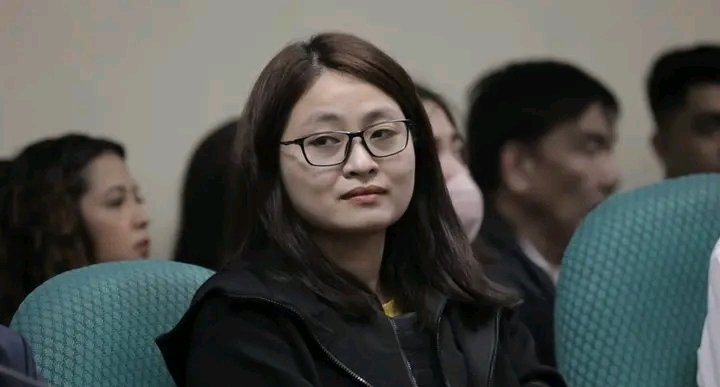
Guo during the Senate hearing on her alleged POGO ties in September 2024

In May 2024, during a Senate inquiry, senators said that the POGO compound housed "mercenaries" allegedly involved in cybercrimes and surveillance activities, citing intelligence reports. Meanwhile, Guo countered allegations against her, stating that she was the former landowner of the property, and her vehicle, found within the compound, was sold in 2020. Guo stated that, being one of the incorporators of Baofu, she later sold her shares upon entering politics.

During the inquiry, Senator Risa Hontiveros suggested that Guo may be a Chinese "asset" trained to infiltrate the Philippine government and "have an influence in Philippine politics". In response to the allegations, Guo expressed dismay, saying that she had been "judged prematurely" via a trial by publicity. Guo stressed that she was "not a coddler, not a protector of POGOs", adding in a subsequent interview by Karen Davila that she had been rattled by senators' questions about her private life and was opposed to POGOs.

On May 16, 2024, Solicitor General Menardo Guevarra said he designated a "team of solicitors" to investigate if Guo is illegally "holding or exercising a public office" as prefatory to quo warranto under Rule 66, Revised Rules of Court. On May 23, Senate President Francis Escudero said that the burden of proof regarding Guo's citizenship lies upon the accusers.

The Department of the Interior and Local Government, in its updated report submitted on May 17, subsequently recommended that Guo be suspended by the Ombudsman following what it called "troubling findings" during its investigation over her alleged connections to POGOs. Ombudsman Samuel Martires, however, told 24 Oras that his office has received the DILG's unsigned task force's fact-finding report copy. In effect, the Ombudsman remanded Guo's case, hinting that the DILG ought to file a valid criminal complaint with attached legal documents for Guo's criminal investigation prior to preventive suspension. In response, Bamban vice mayor Leonardo Anunciacion said there was no basis for Guo to be suspended, while Moncada mayor Estelita Aquino, the president of the League of Municipalities of the Philippines-Tarlac chapter, of which Guo is the treasurer, also defended Guo, saying that she is "helpful and easy to get along with" and that Bamban had progressed under her leadership. The Nationalist People's Coalition also announced an investigation into Guo, with party member Win Gatchalian urging the NPC to expel her. On June 1, the DILG announced that it had filed a criminal complaint to the Ombudsman dated May 24 charging Guo with graft. On June 21, the Presidential Anti-Organized Crime Commission filed a criminal complaint with the DOJ charging Guo and 13 others with human trafficking involving the POGO in Bamban.

On May 21, 2024, Hontiveros, on her social media account, revealed that Guo's business associates, Lin Baoying and Zhang Ruijin, were involved in the largest money laundering case in Singapore, amounting to S$3.0 billion. Guo stated during the Senate hearing later that day that she only found out about her connections to the syndicate after reading Hontiveros' post. (Note: Attributed to multiple references:)

Some members of the House of Representatives also expressed intent to launch a parallel probe of Guo. It also recommended that Guo be temporarily stripped of authority over the Bamban municipal police force pending her suspension. In response, Guo said that she would not resign and would instead seek reelection as mayor in local elections scheduled in 2025.

President Bongbong Marcos also supported an investigation, adding that she had been under investigation by authorities for some time and that she was not known to most politicians in Tarlac. In an apparent effort to refute Marcos' claims that "no one knows her", photos from Guo's Facebook and other social media profiles resurfaced showing both Guo and Marcos together. Photos from March 2022 showed both Guo and Marcos in red shirts and face masks during the 2022 election campaign, as well as photos of Guo doing a high five with Leyte's 1st district representative Martin Romualdez. Another photo from February 2024 also showed Guo elbow-bumping with Marcos during the latter's inspection of the Airport–New Clark City Access Road (ANAR).

On May 26, 2024, Chinese-Filipino activist and academic Teresita Ang See criticized the Senate investigation for focusing too heavily on Guo, claiming that the investigation has been diverted from its main subject of POGOs into an interrogation of Guo's lifestyle and ability to speak Chinese. Ang-See called for the investigation to "focus on the issues that aid legislation", denouncing the current investigation as a "ridiculous tear-jerker 'zarzuela'".

Guo did not attend the Senate hearings on June 25 and July 10, 2024, citing her physical and mental health. Consequently, she was subpoenaed by Senator Risa Hontiveros on June 25 and cited for contempt by the Senate Committee on Women, Children, Family Relations and Gender Equality, chaired by Hontiveros, on July 10. On July 11, Guo's assets were ordered frozen by the Court of Appeals, following a request from the Anti-Money Laundering Council. On July 12, the Senate released an arrest order for Guo and her alleged relatives over the contempt charges. However, subsequent searches at her possible locations failed to locate her.

On August 14, a complaint was filed against Guo by the Bureau of Internal Revenue for tax evasion amounting to ₱500,000 relating to her transactions in Baofu. On August 30, Guo and 22 others were charged with money laundering by authorities. On September 5, an arrest warrant was issued by a court in Capas, Tarlac, against Guo on charges of graft and corruption.

After being repatriated from Indonesia, where she had been hiding, Guo reappeared in the Senate hearing on September 9, 2024, but was cited in contempt for a second time by the Senate Committee on Women, Children, Family Relations, and Gender Equality for perjury and giving evasive answers. In the hearing, it was revealed that Guo was found to have paid Baofu's electric bills totaling ₱51.718 million when she was mayor from 2022 to 2024. On September 17, the DOJ filed qualified human trafficking charges against Guo and others before the Pasig Regional Trial Court.

On September 19, 2024, Guo appeared in a hearing of the House of Representatives Quad Committee, a merger of the congressional committees on dangerous drugs, public order and safety, human rights, and public accounts, as part of its investigation into extrajudicial killings, illegal drugs, and POGOs. She was again cited in contempt for giving evasive answers.

On October 3, 2024, the NBI charged Guo with falsification of documents, perjury, and obstruction of justice over her fraudulent signing of legal documents while she was in hiding.

On December 12, 2024, the House of Representatives lifted its contempt citation against Guo, citing her custody in separate court cases.

On January 15, 2025, Guo and her co-accused were charged with 62 counts of money laundering by the DOJ. On May 23, they were charged with another 62 counts of money laundering by the DOJ. The NBI filed 70 charges against Guo and her relatives on October 2 for falsification of public documents and simulation of minimum capital stock.

On November 20, 2025, Guo was convicted of qualified human trafficking, with the sentence being life imprisonment and a fine of ₱2 million ($33,832). It was a landmark ruling under the Anti-Trafficking in Persons Act, proving that people who are indirectly involved in human trafficking by providing support can be convicted. Guo was moved to the Correctional Institution for Women.

On August 14, 2026, Guo was served with another arrest warrant while in prison on charges of graft.

== Political career ==
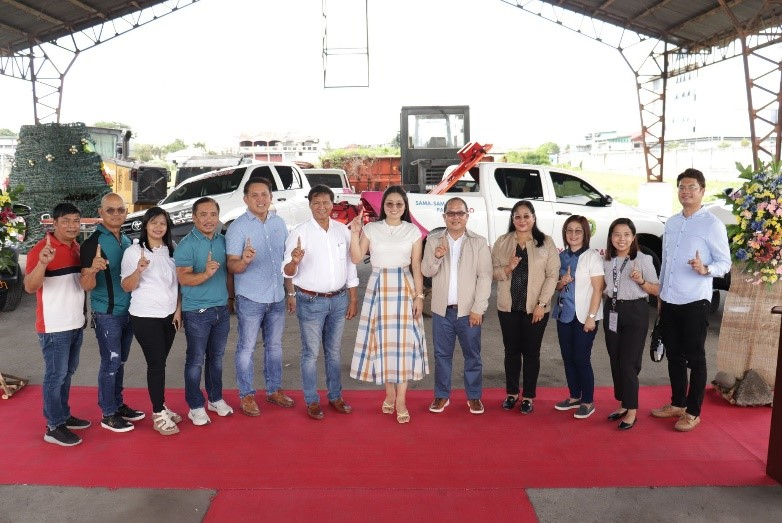
Alice Guo (center) takes part in the awarding ceremony by the Department of the Interior and Local Government in May 2023. The DILG gave rescue vehicles for Bamban due to the town receiving a Seal of Good Local Governance (SGLG) award in 2022.

In October 2021, Guo filed her certificate of candidacy to run for municipal mayor of Bamban, Tarlac, as an independent candidate. She tapped former mayor Leonardo Anunciacion as her running mate for vice mayor. During the campaign period for the 2022 elections, she expressed support for the candidacies of Bongbong Marcos and Sara Duterte for president and vice president, respectively. Her campaign expenses, according to her Statement of Contributions and Expenditures (SOCE), exceeded ₱134,000. In 2024, she stated that she had received support from her friends and from the "previous administration" during the campaign. She also prominently used the color pink for her campaign. Guo was also supported by the outgoing mayor, Jose Antonio Feliciano, who encouraged her to run despite maintaining only a "civil" relationship after he had a falling out with his previous preferred successor. She was also supported and endorsed by the religious group Iglesia ni Cristo (INC), while residents alleged that Guo participated in vote buying.

In May 2022, Guo won the mayoralty race, garnering 16,503 votes against her closest rival, Anupul barangay captain Joey Salting, who received 16,035 votes in the seven-way contest. She became the first female municipal mayor of Bamban. Assuming office on June 30, 2022, she initiated projects including the Barangayan, offering complimentary medical, dental, and documentation services and rabies vaccinations for both dogs and cats. In the third quarter of 2023, following Bamban's receipt of a Seal of Good Local Governance (SGLG) award from the Department of the Interior and Local Government (DILG), Guo joined the Nationalist People's Coalition (NPC).

On June 3, 2024, Guo, along with Bamban municipal business permit and licensing officer Edwin Ocampo and municipal legal officer Adenn Sigua, was ordered suspended on a preventive basis for six months by the Ombudsman as part of an investigation into her alleged involvement in Philippine Offshore Gaming Operators (POGOs). The order gave due course to the DILG's May 24 complaint.

Guo was removed from the NPC on June 22, 2024. In July 2024, Solicitor-General Menardo Guevarra filed a quo warranto petition with the Manila Regional Trial Court (RTC) Branch 34 to nullify Guo's election as mayor. On August 13, 2024, Guo was removed as mayor by the Ombudsman for grave misconduct regarding her involvement in POGOs. Her retirement benefits were forfeited, and she was perpetually barred from seeking public office. As her vice mayor, Leonardo Anunciacion, and seven members of the Sangguniang Bayan (municipal council) were also suspended for three months on the same charges, Guo was succeeded by Erano Timbang, a councilor who topped the 2022 race and was the only councilor who voted against the establishment of the POGO in Bamban.

Amidst the Ombudsman's decision and ongoing investigations, Guo initially said she would be seeking reelection as mayor of Bamban in the 2025 Philippine general election. But on October 8, 2024, she said she would not push through with her reelection to focus on her legal cases.

On June 27, 2025, the Manila RTC Branch 34 affirmed the quo warranto filed against Guo, concluding she is "undoubtedly Chinese" who was born to Chinese parents and noted that a signature expert certified that Guo's fingerprint matches the supposedly separate individual known as Guo Hua Ping. Guo herself did not present any witnesses for her trial and only presented her Philippine birth certificate and passport as evidence. The court also voided her tenure as mayor from 2022 to 2024 since she was ineligible to hold public office. Her birth certificate was later voided on September 24, 2025.

== Alleged espionage for China ==
External videos
- Two YouTube videos
- She Zhijiang: Discarded Chinese spy or criminal mastermind?. 101 East. Al Jazeera English. September 26, 2024. Archived from the original on September 30, 2024 – via YouTube.
- Wang Fugui (interviewee) (October 8, 2024). She Zhijiang's ex-cellmate Wang Fugui on Alice Guo: She's a spy but "not a special one". Office of Senator Risa Hontiveros. Archived from the original on October 8, 2024 – via Rappler on YouTube.

Guo's dubious family background and citizenship issues led her to be tagged as a Chinese spy as early as May 2024 when Senator Risa Hontiveros had asked her if she was a Chinese "asset" trained to infiltrate and influence the Philippine government.

She Zhijiang, a Chinese businessman, convicted criminal, and self-confessed spy currently imprisoned in Thailand, accused Guo of being a Chinese spy in an interview with the Al Jazeera English documentary program 101 East. An associate of hers showed a dossier on a Guo Hua Ping that he claimed was about Alice Guo. The dossier claimed she was the daughter of Lin Wen Yi and listed her home address as being in Fujian. A visit by an Al Jazeera researcher to the stated address found it to be the local headquarters of the Chinese Communist Party, and a number of local residents interviewed said that they recognized Guo as the daughter of Lin Wen Yi, and that she lived in the area until 2002. She appealed to Guo to confess for her own safety.

In response to the documentary being shown at a House of Representatives inquiry on September 27, Guo denied being a spy and of ever knowing her, and threatened to file a lawsuit against him as well as against Al Jazeera.

Hontiveros, on October 8, said that Wang Fugui, a former cellmate of hers, through a teleconference interview backed the allegation. Wang said Guo is indeed a spy, but not a "special" spy, and that it just happened that she has a copy of Guo's supposed state security background. Wang also claimed that Guo's 2022 mayoral campaign was "arranged by Chinese state security".

On November 26, the National Intelligence Coordinating Agency (NICA) stated that there is consensus in the intelligence community that Guo is an "agent of influence".

The Economist wrote in July 2026 that Guo was unlikely to be a spy, noting that the claims have not been backed by persuasive evidence and that the Chinese government has a negative view of scammers, who often target Chinese citizens. The newspaper added that the fact that Guo escaped to Southeast Asia rather than China was further evidence that she was not a spy.

== Escape and subsequent capture ==
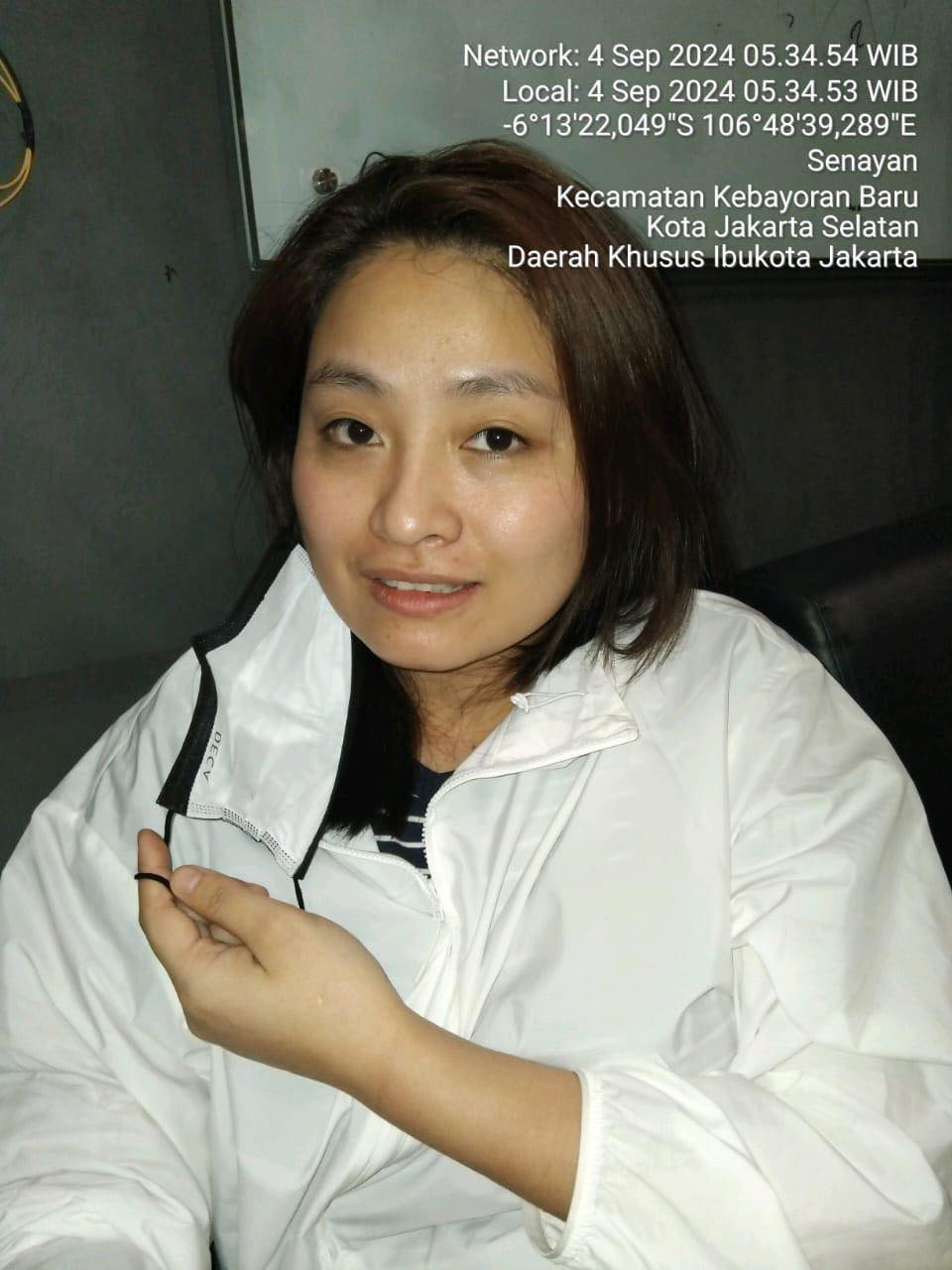
Guo, after being captured by the Directorate General of Immigration and the Indonesian National Police in Tangerang, and confirming her identity

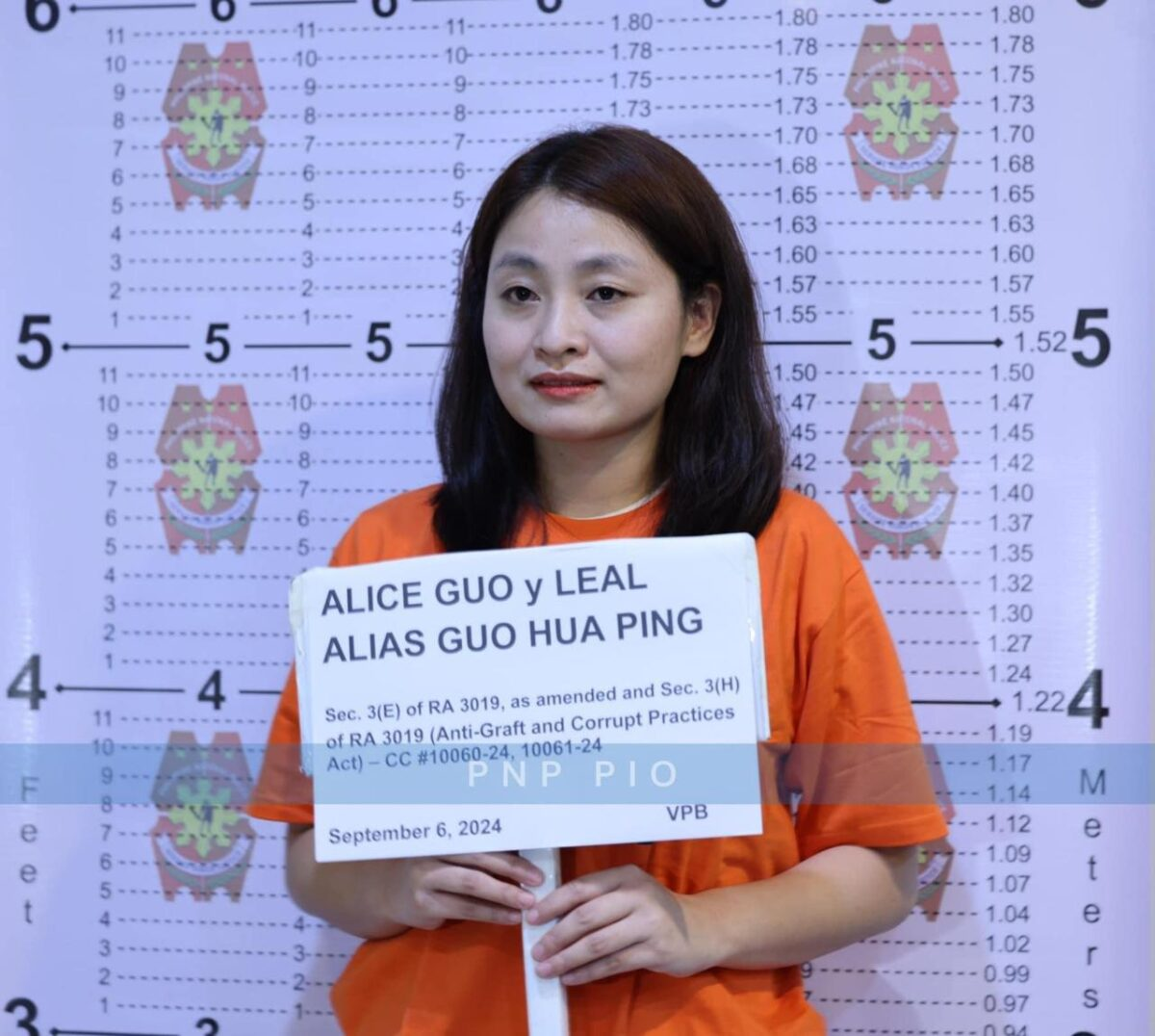
Mug shot of Guo, following her arrest by the Philippine National Police

On August 19, 2024, Senator Risa Hontiveros released documents appearing to show that Guo had fled the Philippines for Malaysia on July 18 before going to Singapore and taking a ferry to Riau Islands, Indonesia. The Presidential Anti-Organized Crime Commission later said that Guo arrived in Indonesia on August 18. This was despite the Immigration Lookout Bulletin Order issued by the DOJ on June 25, 2024, against Guo and 17 others. In contrast, lawyer Elmer Galicia, who notarized Guo's counter-affidavit for human trafficking charges, said that he had personally spotted Guo in the Philippines on August 14, while her lawyer Stephen David claimed that she was in the country at that time based on their conversation the day before. However, Galicia later admitted that Guo did not personally swear the document before him, and a signature mismatch was later revealed by the NBI nearly a month later. Conflicting reports emerged as to how Guo fled the Philippines, with officials saying that she escaped by air and Alice and Shiela Guo saying that they fled by boats.

On August 20, the Philippine government ordered the cancellation of the passports of Guo and her relatives. On August 21, Shiela Guo and Cassandra Ong were detained in Batam, Indonesia, and repatriated to the Philippines the next day. By August 26, Guo was reportedly in Jakarta, according to the Bureau of Immigration. On September 3, Guo was arrested by the Directorate General of Immigration and the Indonesian National Police in Tangerang. On September 5, she was turned over by Indonesian authorities to Philippine authorities led by Interior and Local Government Secretary Benhur Abalos and was deported back to the Philippines. According to Abalos, Guo cited threats to her security as her reason to go abroad. She arrived in Metro Manila through a private jet in the early hours of September 6 and was detained overnight at the Philippine National Police (PNP) headquarters in Camp Crame, Quezon City. Later that day, she was transferred to Capas, Tarlac, as part of an arrest warrant for graft charges. Guo initially opted not to post bail for the case until September 20. Thus, she would remain in Camp Crame under PNP custody, pending a final decision regarding the overlapping cases against her in the Senate and in Capas. On September 13, the graft charges against Guo were transferred to the jurisdiction of a court in Valenzuela. On September 14, the Supreme Court ordered the Capas RTC Branch 66 to transfer the non-bailable trafficking cases, under Republic Act No. 9208 of Guo and five others to the Pasig RTC.

On September 20, the Valenzuela RTC Branch 282 rescheduled Guo's arraignment to September 30 regarding two counts of graft, in response to the pending motion to quash information filed by Guo's camp when the case was still in Capas. Additionally, the Pasig City RTC Branch 167 ordered Guo's transfer from the Camp Crame Custodial Center to the Pasig City Jail Female Dormitory. The transfer occurred on September 23 and, following a mandatory medical and physical examination, she was diagnosed with a suspected left lung infection but tested negative for tuberculosis.

=== "Celebrity" treatment controversy ===
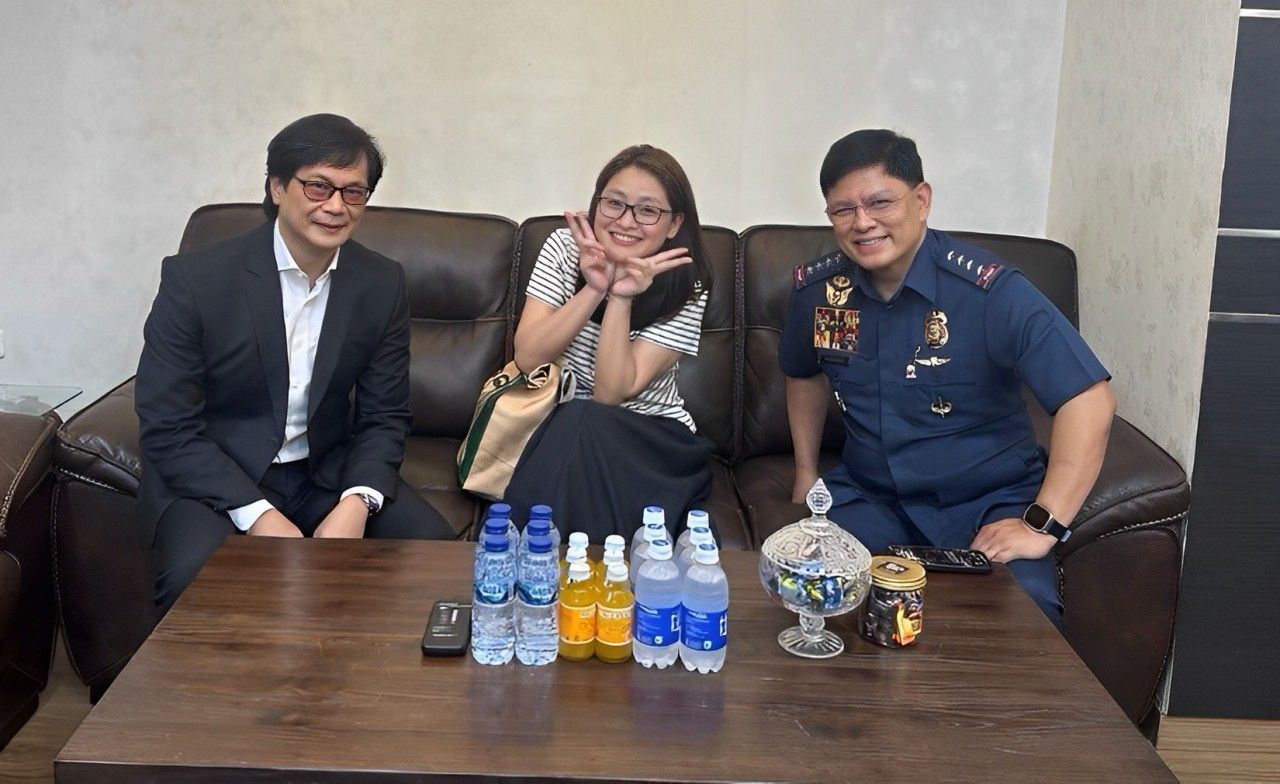
Interior and Local Government Secretary Benhur Abalos (left) and PNP chief Rommel Marbil (right) accompanying Guo (center) during her deportation proceedings in Indonesia. This particular photo drew negative reception in the Philippines due to Guo and the officials' cheerful behavior when taken to context the actual circumstances behind the photo.

Critics, including lawmakers and social media users, condemned the warm reception Guo had received from Philippine officials in Indonesia, which included them posing cheerfully in photographs with her, a practice deemed more suitable for celebrity encounters than law enforcement. A photo of Secretary Abalos and PNP chief Rommel Marbil documenting a private meeting with Guo was particularly given focus by critics for its bad optics.

Senator Risa Hontiveros criticized the authorities in the photos, emphasizing that Guo was a fugitive with a human trafficking case and "not a celebrity." The authorities' actions were described as a "mockery" for the Philippines, highlighting the public's concern over the integrity of the legal process in Guo's case. Officials from the agencies which directly participated in her arrest subsequently apologized over the issue. President Bongbong Marcos later defended the nature of the photographs as part of selfie culture. On September 9, Marcos dismissed Norman Tansingco as commissioner of the Bureau of Immigration, citing the agency's failure to prevent Guo's escape.

== Personal life ==
=== Relationships ===
Conflicting details have also emerged of Guo's relationships. During the Senate hearings into her, Senator Jinggoy Estrada said that Guo has a live-in partner who manages POGO operations, while Guo said she is single. She was also linked to Sual, Pangasinan Mayor Liseldo Calugay, but they denied having a romantic relationship and clarified that they are just friends. Six businesses bear the combination of their names. Calugay's executive assistant was later found to have helped Guo in notarizing her counter-affidavit after she had fled the country.

=== Languages ===
Guo has said that she identifies her mother tongue as Filipino and is proficient in only a few Hokkien words. She has little fluency in Kapampangan, a language common in Bamban. According to her elementary classmates at Grace Christian High School, Guo did not speak either English or Filipino in the early 2000s, suggesting that she was from China.

=== Wealth ===
According to her December 2023 Statement of Assets, Liabilities, and Net Worth (SALN), Guo reported a net worth of ₱177.5 million, with assets totaling ₱367 million and liabilities exceeding ₱189 million. Her assets include nine properties in Marilao, Bamban, and Capas, acquired for over ₱20 million since 2008, three dump trucks worth ₱2 million each, and a helicopter, which was recently sold to an undisclosed British firm, worth ₱60 million. Guo also declared shares in several companies, jewelry worth ₱1.5 million, and ₱198 million in bank and cash holdings.

However, discrepancies arose in Alice Guo's financial declarations. GMA Integrated News Research reported her assets at around ₱429.6 million in her June 30, 2022, SALN. An amended SALN on July 1, 2022, showed her net worth dropped to exactly ₱286 million, removing real estate properties, club shares, and a ₱138 million land acquisition deposit that were later restored by December 31, 2022. Anti-Money Laundering Council documents also revealed billions of pesos were deposited into Guo's bank accounts. It was also revealed that Guo holds 31 or 36 bank accounts solely under her name and owns 12 real estate properties, 12 vehicles, and a helicopter, according to the Court of Appeals, which issued a freeze order on these assets on July 11, 2024.

Guo was alleged to own a McLaren 620R, which she denied. She insisted that it was borrowed from a friend for a car show event in Concepcion, Tarlac. As of May 2024, the Land Transportation Office has 12 vehicles in record under Guo's name and not under one of her businesses; the McLaren is not among these. Guo says she uses a GAC GS8 vehicle for her personal use.

== Personal information summary ==
	According to Guo	Contradictory information
Legal birth name	Alice Leal Guo	Guo Hua Ping (as per Chinese passport; and fingerprint analysis by the NBI)
Birth date (and age)	July 12, 1986 (age 40) (as per Philippine birth certificate)	August 31, 1990 (age 36) (as per Chinese passport)
Birthplace	Tarlac, Tarlac, Philippines (as per 2019 COC)	Fujian, China (as per Chinese passport)
Citizenship	Filipino	Chinese (as per SIRV)
Mother	Amelia Leal	Lin Wen Yi (as per SIRV)
Father	Jian Zhong Guo (Angelito Guo)	—N/a
Education	Homeschooled (under "Teacher Rubilyn")	Grace Christian High School (as per enrollment forms)

== Electoral history ==
2022 Bamban mayoral election
Party	Candidate	Votes	%
Independent	Alice Guo	16,503	42.98
NPC	Joey Salting	16,035	41.76
Aksyon	Diegogarcia Ilagan	3,230	8.41
PDP–Laban	Joseph Gomez	2,372	6.18
Independent	Son Marimla	126	0.33
Independent	Nestor Serrano	83	0.22
Independent	Ferdinand Mariano	48	0.13
Total votes		35,497	100.00
Independent gain from NPC			

== See also ==
- 2025 China–Philippines espionage cases
- Naturalization of Li Duan Wang
- Joseph Sy
- Eileen Wang, former mayor of Arcadia, California, who pleaded guilty to acting as an illegal agent of the People's Republic of China
- Jensen Huang scandal
