= Naturalization of Li Duan Wang =

Legislation to grant citizenship to a Chinese businessman

An Act Granting Philippine Citizenship to Li Duan Wang

Congress of the Philippines
- Enacted by: House of Representatives
- Enacted: September 5, 2023
- Passed by: Senate
- Passed: January 27, 2025
- Vetoed by: President Bongbong Marcos
- Vetoed: April 11, 2025

Legislative history

Initiating chamber: House of Representatives
- Bill citation: House Bill No. 8839
- Introduced by: Joey Salceda (Albay); Juliet Ferrer (Negros Occidental)
- Introduced: September 7, 2023
- Third reading: September 13, 2023
- Voting summary: 211 voted for; 1 voted against; 17 abstained

Revising chamber: Senate
- Member(s) in charge: Francis Tolentino
- Committee responsible: Justice and Human Rights
- First reading: September 13, 2023
- Second reading: January 20, 2025
- Third reading: January 27, 2025
- Voting summary: 19 voted for; 1 voted against; None abstained
- Committee report: Committee Report No. 216
- Status: Vetoed

The averted naturalization of Li Duan Wang was subject to scrutiny in the Senate of the Philippines due to controversy involving Philippine offshore gaming operators (POGOs). Wang is a Chinese businessman in the Philippines who is involved in the gambling and leisure industry.

Wang's naturalization bid was first initiated in 2023 in the House of Representatives. It was endorsed to the Senate in 2025, where it was supported by every senator except Risa Hontiveros, who questioned Wang's association with Duanren Wu, who allegedly ran illegal POGO operations.

President Bongbong Marcos vetoed the bill that would have granted Wang Philippine citizenship.

== Naturalization bid ==
Li Duan Wang is a Chinese businessman who has been in the Philippines since 1991. House Bill No. 8839 was filed on September 27, 2023, by Joey Salceda of Albay's 2nd district and Juliet Ferrer of Negros Occidental's 4th district in the House of Representatives The bill proposing the granting of Philippine citizenship to Wang via naturalization was sent to the Senate for approval.

The bill was approved by the Senate on January 27, 2025, with 19 affirmative votes, one negative, and zero abstention. Only Senator Risa Hontiveros voted against raising "red flags" to Wang's application. Hontiveros said that Wang is a "junket operator" of Nine Dynasty Casino and an associate of Duanren Wu, the alleged boss of the Philippine offshore gaming operator (POGO) hub in Porac, Pampanga raided by authorities, his affiliation with the Philippine Jinjiang Yu Shi Association which Hontiveros is alleged to be part of China's united front.

Wang also declared himself to be a Filipino named Mark Ong, who owns Avia Leisure Group according to Securities and Exchange Commission records. Avia operates KTVs, lounges, coffee shops and provides services to Chinese casino players. Hontiveros was suspicious of Avia operating a spa in Newport City in the same building and a floor above the spa operated by the Yatai group as claimed by self-confessed Chinese spy She Zhijiang.

== Veto ==
On April 11, 2025. Philippine President Bongbong Marcos, vetoed the legislative naturalization of Wang. Marcos cited warnings by relevant government agencies about Wang's character stating that Philippine citizenship which is a privilege cannot be used to advance "ominous interests".
