= Bamban =

Municipality in Tarlac, Philippines

- Municipality
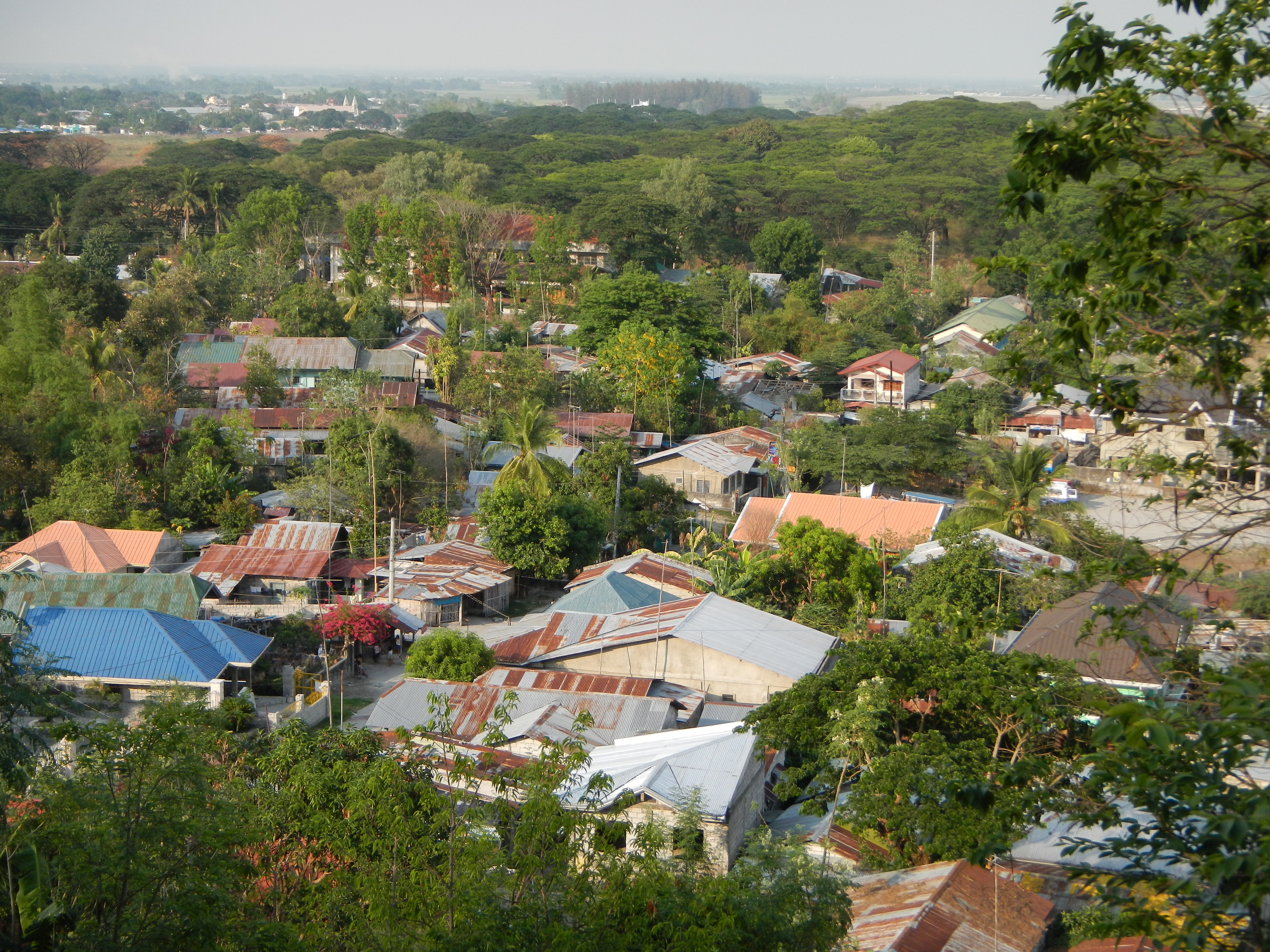
- Panoramic of Bamban

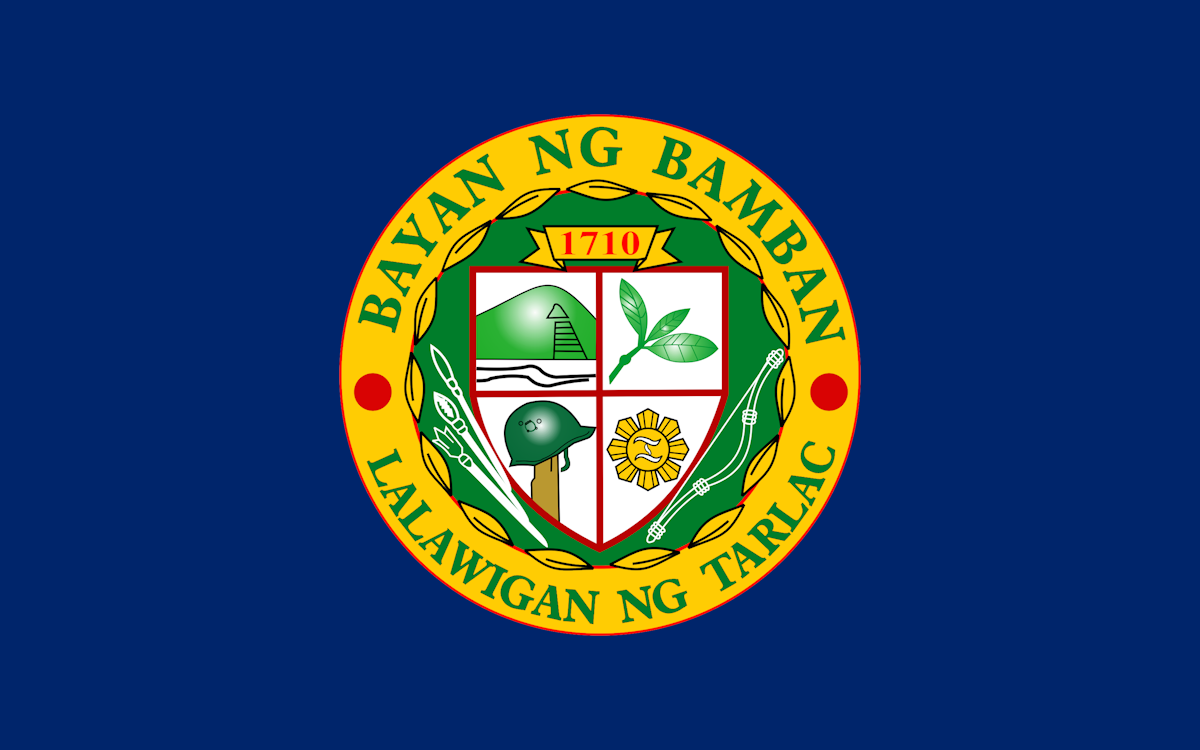
- Flag Seal

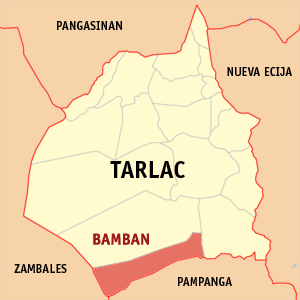
- Map of Tarlac with Bamban highlighted
- Interactive map of Bamban
- Location within the Philippines
- Coordinates: 15°16′27″N 120°34′01″E
- Country: Philippines
- Region: Central Luzon
- Province: Tarlac
- District: 3rd district
- Founded: June 6, 1710
- Named for: Donax canniformis (locally called Bamban)
- Barangays: 15 (see Barangays)

Government
  - Type: Sangguniang Bayan
  - Mayor: Jose M. Salting Jr.
  - Vice Mayor: Leonardo C. Anunciacion
  - Representative: Noel N. Rivera
  - Municipal Council: Members: Levy M. Tadeo; Mary Andrei S. Lacsamana; Semel S. Manipon; Rainier Q. Rivera; Jayson S. Galang; Marino Rafael M. Morales III; Robin S. Mangiliman
  - Electorate: 47,867 voters (2025)

Area
  - Total: 251.98 km^{2} (97.29 sq mi)
- Elevation: 89 m (292 ft)
- Highest elevation: 265 m (869 ft)
- Lowest elevation: 48 m (157 ft)

Population (2024 census)
  - Total: 81,012
  - Density: 321.50/km^{2} (832.69/sq mi)
  - Households: 17,695

Economy
  - Income class: 1st municipal income class
  - Poverty incidence: 13.58% (2023)

Service provider
  - Electricity: Tarlac 2 Electric Cooperative (TARELCO 2)
- Time zone: UTC+8 (PST)
- ZIP code: 2317, 2023 (portions under Clark Freeport and Special Economic Zone)
- PSGC: 0306902000
- IDD : area code: +63 (0)45
- Native languages: Kapampangan; Tagalog; Ilocano
- Website: bambantarlac.gov.ph

Bamban, officially the Municipality of Bamban (Kapampangan: Balen ning Bamban; Filipino: Bayan ng Bamban), is a municipality in the province of Tarlac, Philippines. According to the 2024 census, it has a population of 81,012 people.

== Etymology ==
The municipality derives its name from the bamban plants (Donax canniformis) that once dominated large areas of land along the river near the foothills. It was initially called cabambanan or mabamban, but was later called simply as bamban.

== History ==
=== Precolonial history ===
The site of Bamban was originally a vast track of wild land extending eastward; and on the west side, composed of forested foothills and mountains lush with tall trees extending deep into the Zambales ranges. The thick forest and mountains were then inhabited by the Aetas (locally known as Baluga), and the Zambal, both of whom subsisted only on fishing and native or wild animals which abounded in the place. Occasionally, traders from Pampanga and the Tagalog provinces braved the wilderness to go northward to Capas and Tarlac.

Before the advent of the Spanish era, small settlers came, attracted by the fertile land sustained by the river. The settlers started small clearings in the thick growth of bamban plants which covered vast portions of the land bordering the river a small distance from the foothills. Because of these plants, the place was eventually named Bamban.

=== Spanish colonial era ===
During the Spanish colonial era, about 1700, Augustinian Recollects came and established the Mission de Pueblos de Bamban. Originally a part of Pampanga, in 1837, a new boundary line was established, thereby permanently making Bamban part of the province of Tarlac.

Official recognition as a town was sanctioned by the gobernadorcillos in Tarlac town. Don Martín Sibal was subsequently appointed head and commissioned with the rank of "Capitán". Among the first settlers were the Sibal, Lugtu, Dayrit, Macale, Vergara, Manipon, Gonzales, and de la Cruz clans.

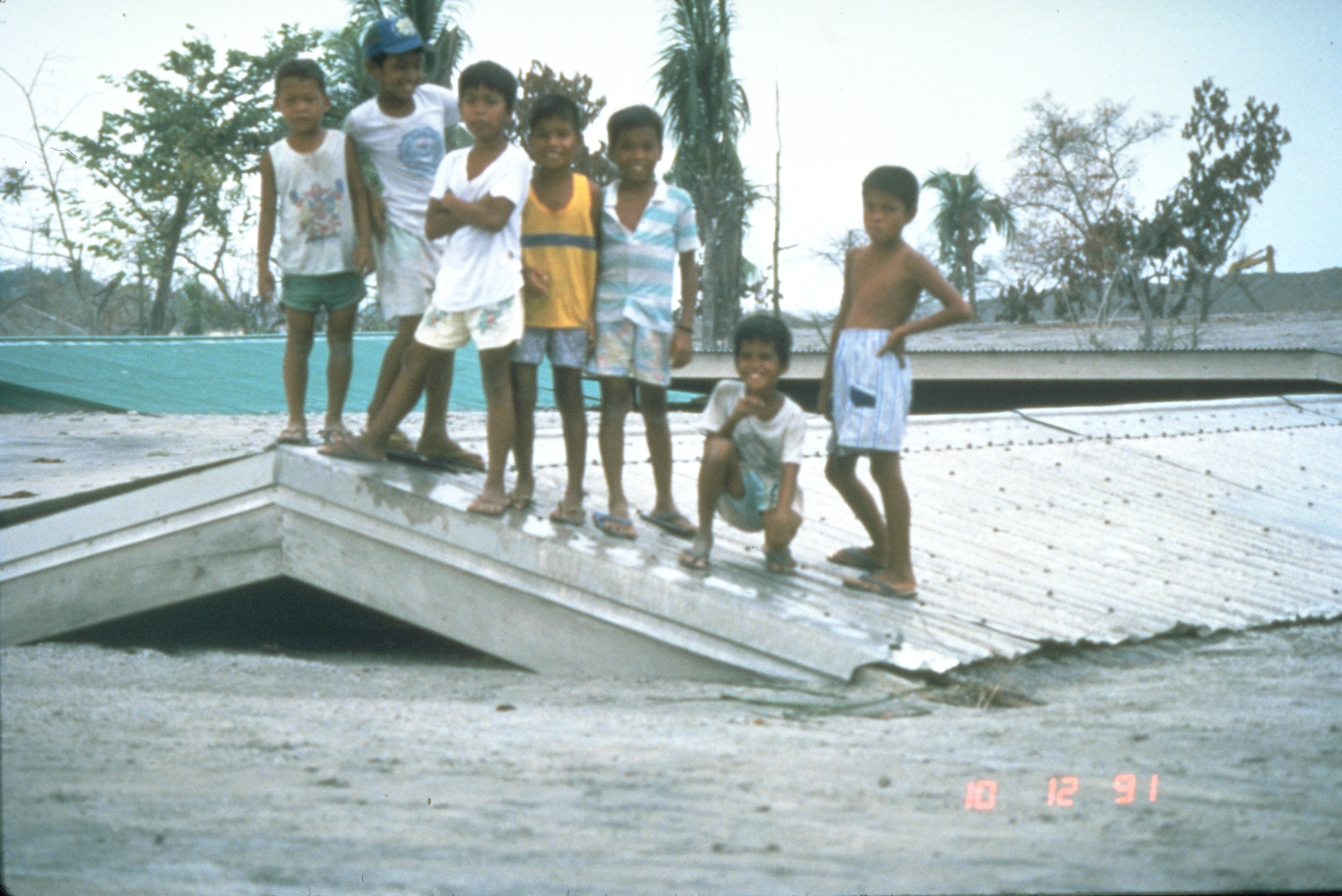
Children on roof of a school in Bamban, that was buried by lahars during the 1991 eruption of Mt. Pinatubo.

During the revolution of 1896, Bamban was one of the first towns to take up arms against the Spaniards. Northwest of the town situated among the hills are remnants of strongholds built by Bambanenses who joined Gen. Servillano Aquino in the uprising in Tarlac. Up to this time, a portion of the foothills in the area is called "Batiawan" or look-out point.

=== American colonial era ===
When the Americans came in 1900, the pueblo gradually grew into a town. The Bamban Sugar Central was established. Don Pablo Lagman was the first to be appointed presidente and Don Laureano Campo as vice-presidente under the American military government. Other prominent families then took over the helm of government. During the Commonwealth era, the Sibals, the Lumboys, the Santoses, the Punsalangs, to mention a few, enjoyed political power until the outbreak of World War II. The whole población was devastated and burned during the liberation. Rebuilding began despite the ongoing fighting in the mountains. Growth was fast because of proximity of Clark Air Base. However, prominent families left the town for the city to establish big business and names for themselves.

Aeta guerillas from Bamban formed Aeta Squadron 30 under U.S. Captain Alfred Bruce as part of the Philippine resistance to Japanese occupation.

=== The Bamban barricade during the People Power revolution ===
Bamban played an important role during the People Power revolution because of its proximity to the Capital and to Philippine Military bases further north. In a tactically significant intervention during the revolution, 20,000 people blocked the Bamban Bridge on Feb. 25 to prevent loyalist forces from the Army's 5th Infantry Division in Tarlac from getting through to Manila to reinforce the Marcos forces surrounding Camps Aguinaldo and Crame, in an event which came to be known as "the Bamban barricade."

=== 1991 eruption of Mount Pinatubo ===
The 1991 eruption of Mount Pinatubo and the subsequent flow of lahar to the lowlands of Bamban forced residents to move out or to stay at the Dapdap Resettlement Area, which is on higher grounds.

=== Contemporary history ===
In 2022, businesswoman Alice Guo was elected mayor. The town attracted investments and a then suspected fast-rising Philippine Offshore Gaming Operator (POGO) hub. In 2024, Guo was subjected to a Senate inquiry. She was suspended over suspected links to POGO related criminal activities and questions over her Filipino citizenship and was eventually dismissed from office by the Ombudsman. A court ruling in June 2025, concluded she is a Chinese citizen, thus voiding her entire tenure as mayor.

As Guo's vice mayor, Leonardo Anunciacion, and seven members of the Sangguniang Bayan were also suspended for three months on the same charges, Guo was replaced by Councilor Erano Timbang, who was the only member of the Sangguniang Bayan who voted to oppose the establishment of the POGO in Bamban. An interim vice mayor and other municipal councilors were also installed.

== Geography ==
Bamban is the southernmost town of Tarlac. It shares a common boundary with Mabalacat, Pampanga, and in the west, with Zambales. The boundary is defined by the Parua River, which is a source of irrigation water, food, and sand and gravel for infrastructure projects. The mountainous region situated in the western part comprises almost two-thirds of the total land area, which used to be within the US Military Reservations. Nestled in this part are the BLISS projects and to the north, the MAR settlement project.

Bamban is 99 kilometers (62 mi) from Manila and is 25 kilometers (16 mi) from the provincial capital, Tarlac City.

=== Barangays ===
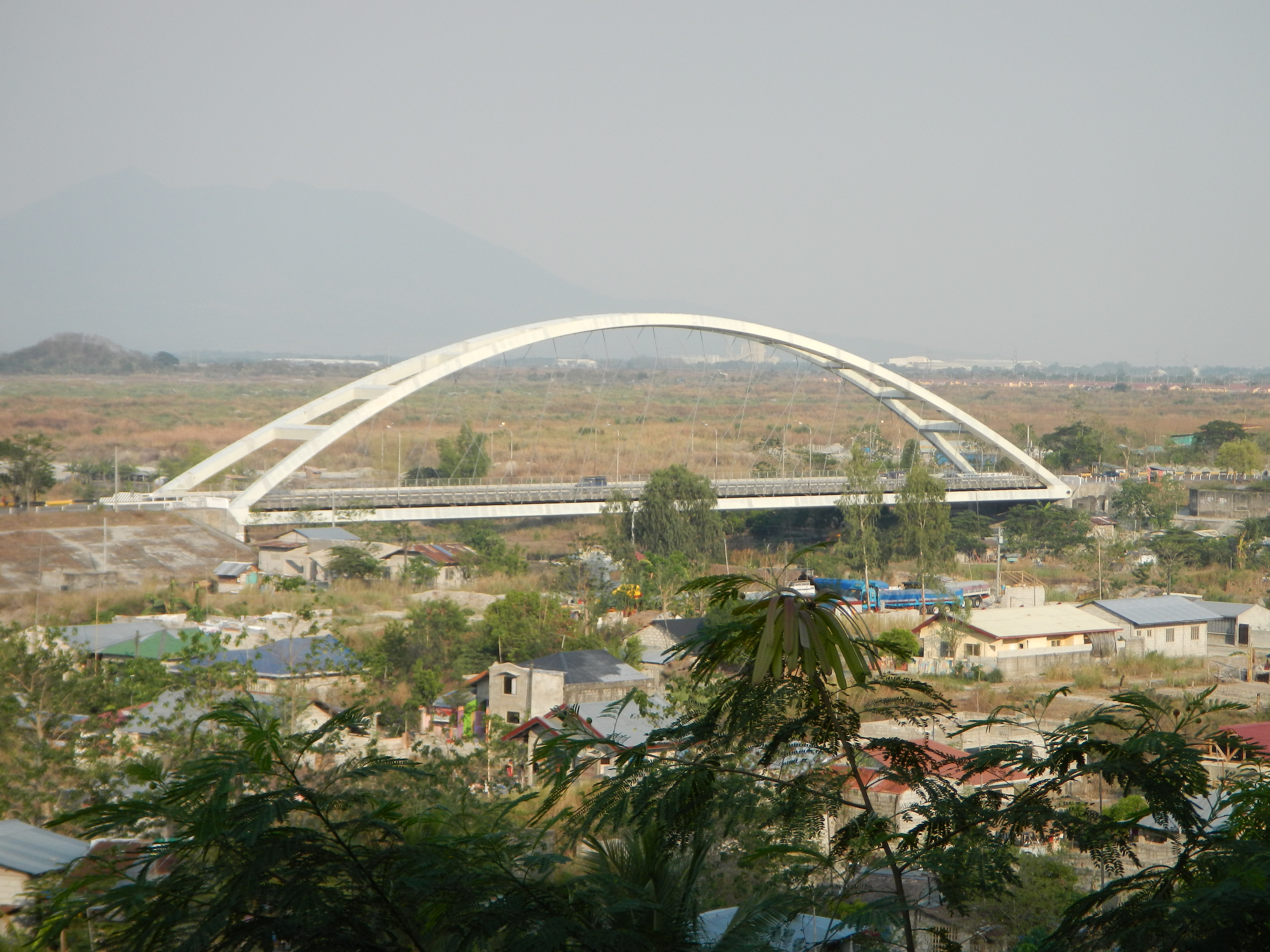
View of the Bamban bridge and barangays Lourdes, Banaba and San Nicolas from the Grotto of Our Lady of Lourdes

Bamban is politically subdivided into 15 barangays, as shown below. Each barangay consists of puroks and some have sitios.

- Anupul
- Banaba
- Bangcu
- Culubasa
- Dela Cruz
- La Paz
- Lourdes
- Malonzo
- San Nicolas (Poblacion)
- San Pedro
- San Rafael
- San Roque
- San Vicente
- Santo Niño
- Virgen de los Remedios (VDR) or Pacalcal

=== Climate ===
Climate data for Bamban, Tarlac
| Month | Jan | Feb | Mar | Apr | May | Jun | Jul | Aug | Sep | Oct | Nov | Dec | Year |
|---|---|---|---|---|---|---|---|---|---|---|---|---|---|
| Mean daily maximum °C (°F) | 30 (86) | 31 (88) | 33 (91) | 35 (95) | 33 (91) | 31 (88) | 30 (86) | 29 (84) | 29 (84) | 30 (86) | 31 (88) | 30 (86) | 31 (88) |
| Mean daily minimum °C (°F) | 19 (66) | 19 (66) | 20 (68) | 22 (72) | 24 (75) | 24 (75) | 24 (75) | 24 (75) | 23 (73) | 22 (72) | 21 (70) | 20 (68) | 22 (71) |
| Average precipitation mm (inches) | 3 (0.1) | 2 (0.1) | 5 (0.2) | 10 (0.4) | 80 (3.1) | 107 (4.2) | 138 (5.4) | 147 (5.8) | 119 (4.7) | 70 (2.8) | 26 (1.0) | 8 (0.3) | 715 (28.1) |
| Average rainy days | 2.0 | 1.7 | 2.7 | 4.6 | 16.1 | 20.8 | 24.0 | 23.0 | 21.4 | 15.5 | 8.0 | 3.2 | 143 |
Source: Meteoblue

== Demographics ==
Population census of Bamban

| Year | Pop. | ±% p.a. |
|---|---|---|
| 1903 | 3,002 | — |
| 1918 | 4,846 | +3.24% |
| 1939 | 9,663 | +3.34% |
| 1948 | 11,553 | +2.00% |
| 1960 | 13,527 | +1.32% |
| 1970 | 18,474 | +3.16% |
| 1975 | 22,723 | +4.24% |
| 1980 | 26,072 | +2.79% |

| Year | Pop. | ±% p.a. |
|---|---|---|
| 1990 | 35,639 | +3.18% |
| 1995 | 37,115 | +0.76% |
| 2000 | 46,360 | +4.88% |
| 2007 | 61,644 | +4.01% |
| 2010 | 62,413 | +0.45% |
| 2015 | 69,466 | +2.06% |
| 2020 | 78,260 | +2.54% |
| 2024 | 81,012 | +0.83% |

Source: Philippine Statistics Authority

In the 2024 census, the population of Bamban was 81,012 people, with a density of 320 inhabitants per square kilometer or 830 inhabitants per square mile.

The Aeta people is a noted ethnic group in Bamban, with the most known the sub-tribe being the Ayta Mag-Antsi.

== Economy ==
Now closed compound of Baofu Land, a Philippine Offshore Gaming Operator in Bamban.

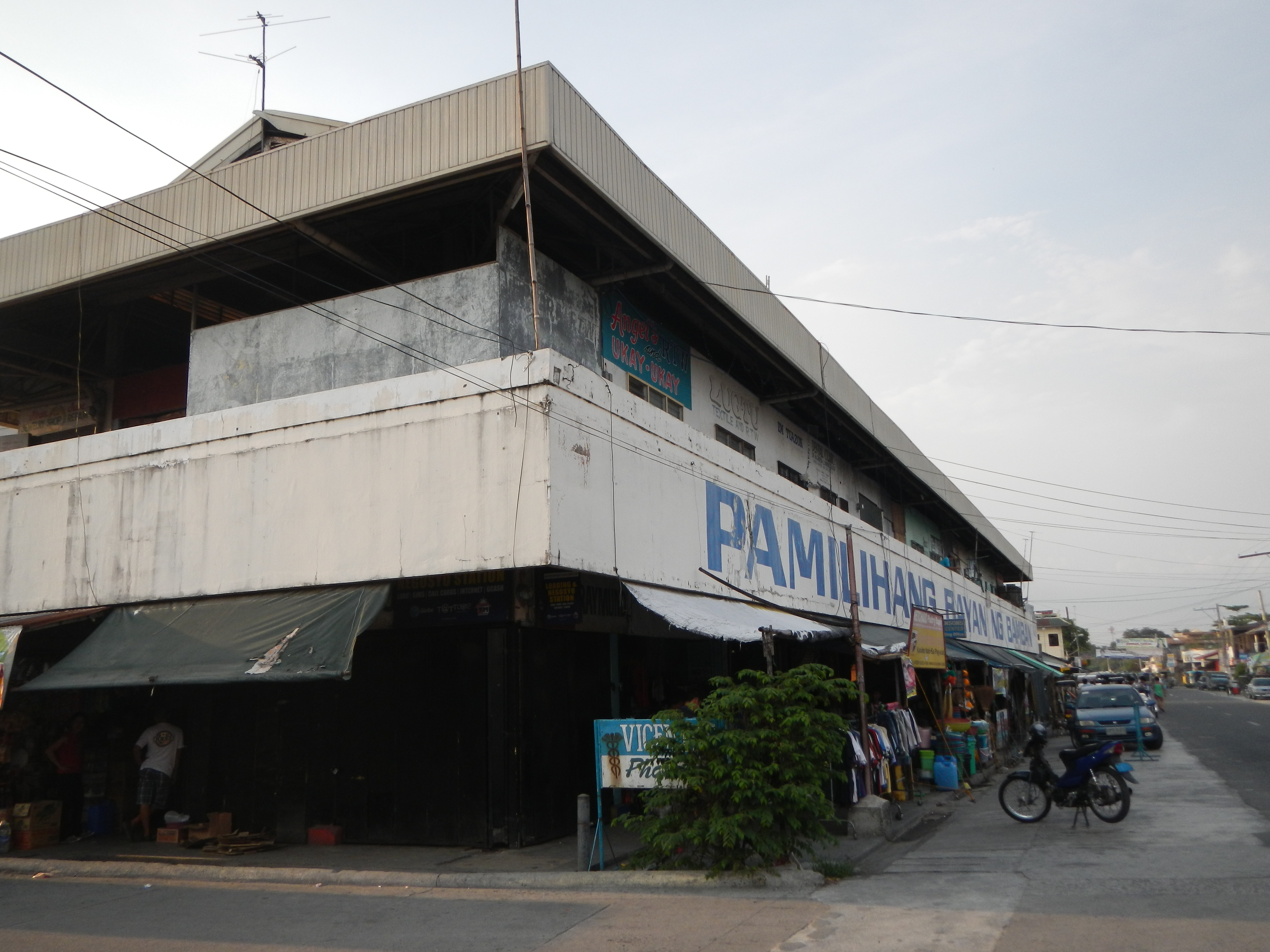
Public market

Poverty incidence of Bamban (%)

Source: Philippine Statistics Authority

Parts of the Clark Special Economic Zone is in Bamban, particularly the barangays of San Vicente and Santo Niño which are partially in an area generally known as Sacobia.

== Elected officials ==
2025-2028 Bamban, Tarlac Officials
| Position | Name | Party |
|---|---|---|
| Mayor | Jose M. Salting Jr. | NPC |
| Vice Mayor | Leonardo C. Anunciacion | Independent |
| Councilors | Levy M. Tadeo | NPC |
| Councilors | Mary Andrei S. Lacsamana | NPC |
| Councilors | Semel S. Manipol | NPC |
| Councilors | Rainier Q. Rivera | NPC |
| Councilors | Jayson S. Galang | NPC |
| Councilors | Mariano Rafael M. Morales III | PFP |
| Councilors | Alvin Dale M. Sibal | Independent |
| Councilors | Robin S. Mangiliman | NPC |
Ex Officio Municipal Council Members
| ABC President | TBD | Nonpartisan |
| SK Federation President | TBD | Nonpartisan |

== Tourism ==
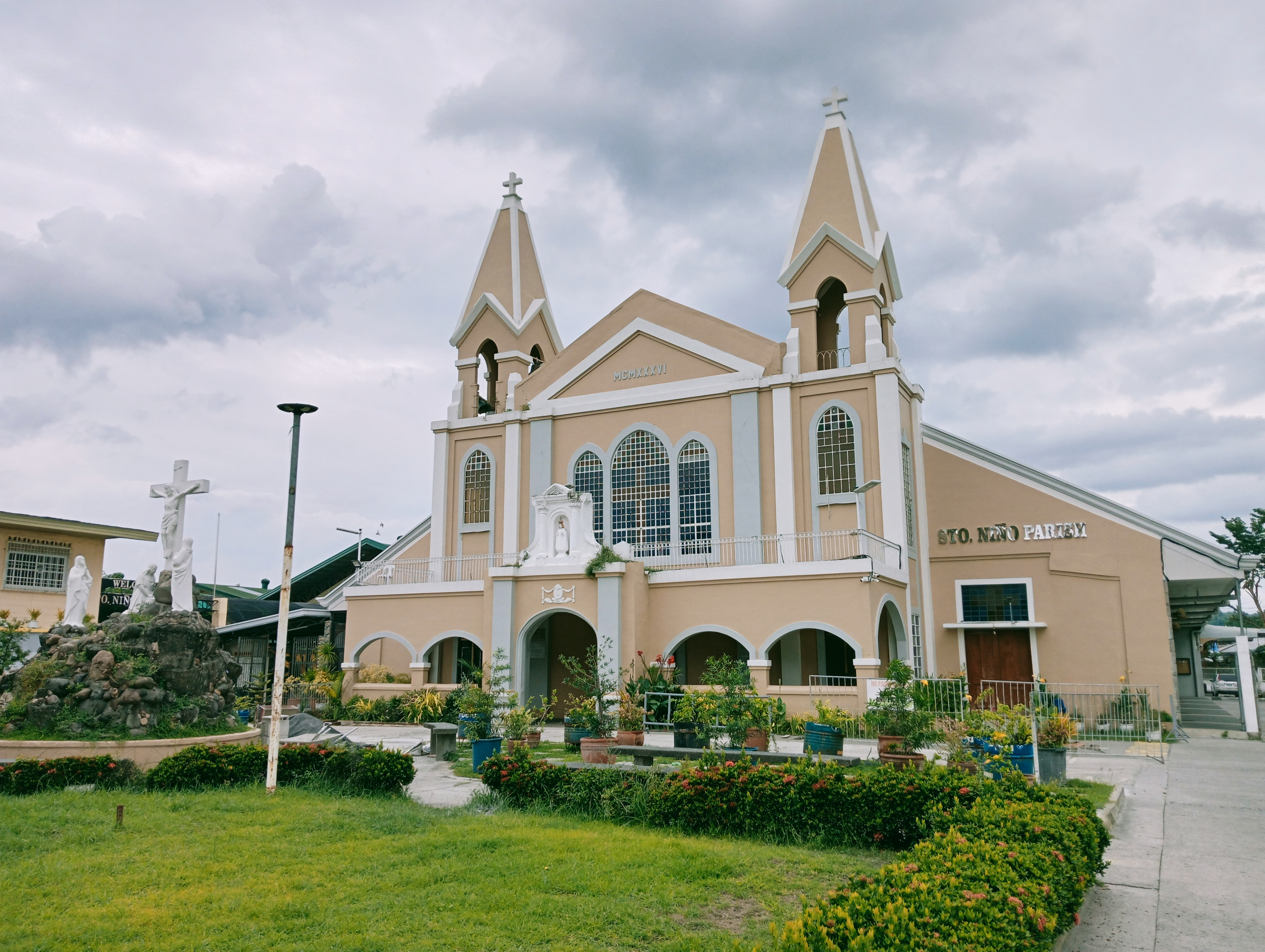
Santo Niño Parish Church

- At the center of the town is the heritage Santo Niño Parish Church of Bamban, (Vicariate of San Nicolas de Tolentino; Vicar Forane: Msgr. Francisco Tañedo which was founded in 1812.
  - Titular Patron: Santo Niño, Feast: Last Saturday of January.
- Grotto of Our Lady of Lourdes of Bamban at Barangay Lourdes
- Goshen Hotel and Resort
- Bamban Bridge
- Bamban World War II Museum
- Bamban Caves and the Matayumtayum Well was used by General Francisco Makabulos and his troops against the Spaniards and later on by Filipino guerrillas during the Second World War.

== Education ==
The Bamban East District and Bamban West District - under the Department of Education (DepEd) Schools Division of Tarlac Province governs all educational institutions within the municipality. It oversees the management and operations of all private and public, from primary to secondary schools.

=== Primary and elementary schools ===
- Anupul Elementary School
- Bamban Central Elementary School
- Bamban Christian Academy
- Bamban Gabaldon Elementary School
- Banaba Elementary School
- Bright Learners School
- Burog Elementary School
- Cornerstone Baptist Deaf Academy
- Dalidagum Foundation
- Dapdap Resettlement Elementary School
- Delos Remedios Elementary School
- Don Domiciano Tizon Primary School
- Gumain Primary School
- Lourdes Elementary School (Dapdap)
- Lourdes Elementary School (Park)
- Magurol-gurol Primary School
- Mainang Resettlement Elementary School
- Malasa Integrated School
- Pag-asa Elementary School
- Pepe and Pilar Ecumenical School Foundation
- San Martin Elementary School
- San Nicolas Elementary School
- San Pedro Elementary School
- San Rafael Elementary School
- San Vicente Elementary School
- SME-AG Global School (Elementary)
- Shekinah Glory Academy
- Sto. Nino Academy - Elementary Department
- Sto. Nino Elementary School
- Villa Concepcion Elementary School

=== Secondary schools ===
- Dapdap High School
- San Roque National High School
- SME-AG Global School
- Sto. Nino Academy - Junior and Senior High School Department
- Mainang High School

== Gallery ==
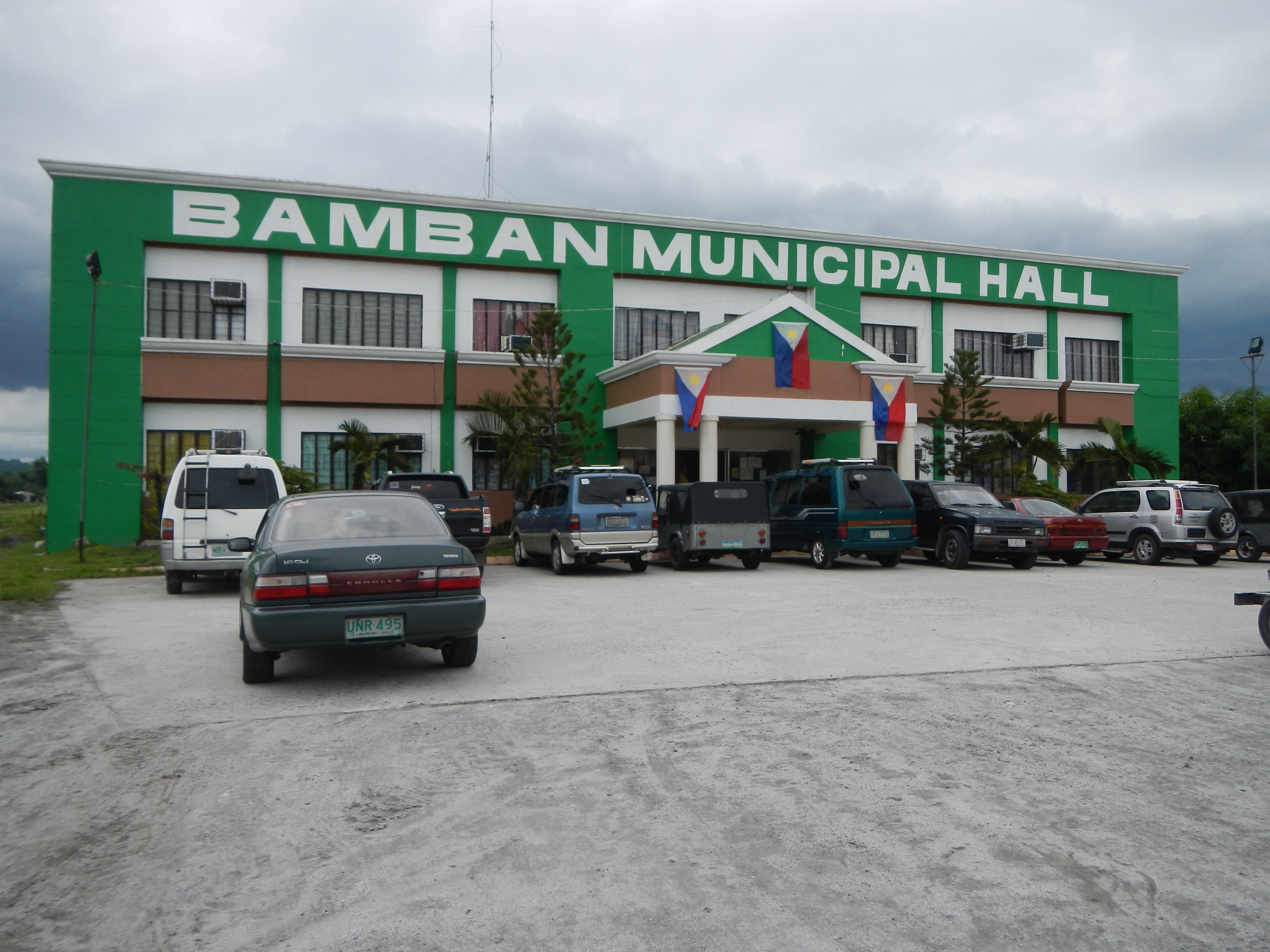
Bamban Municipal Hall (around 2017)

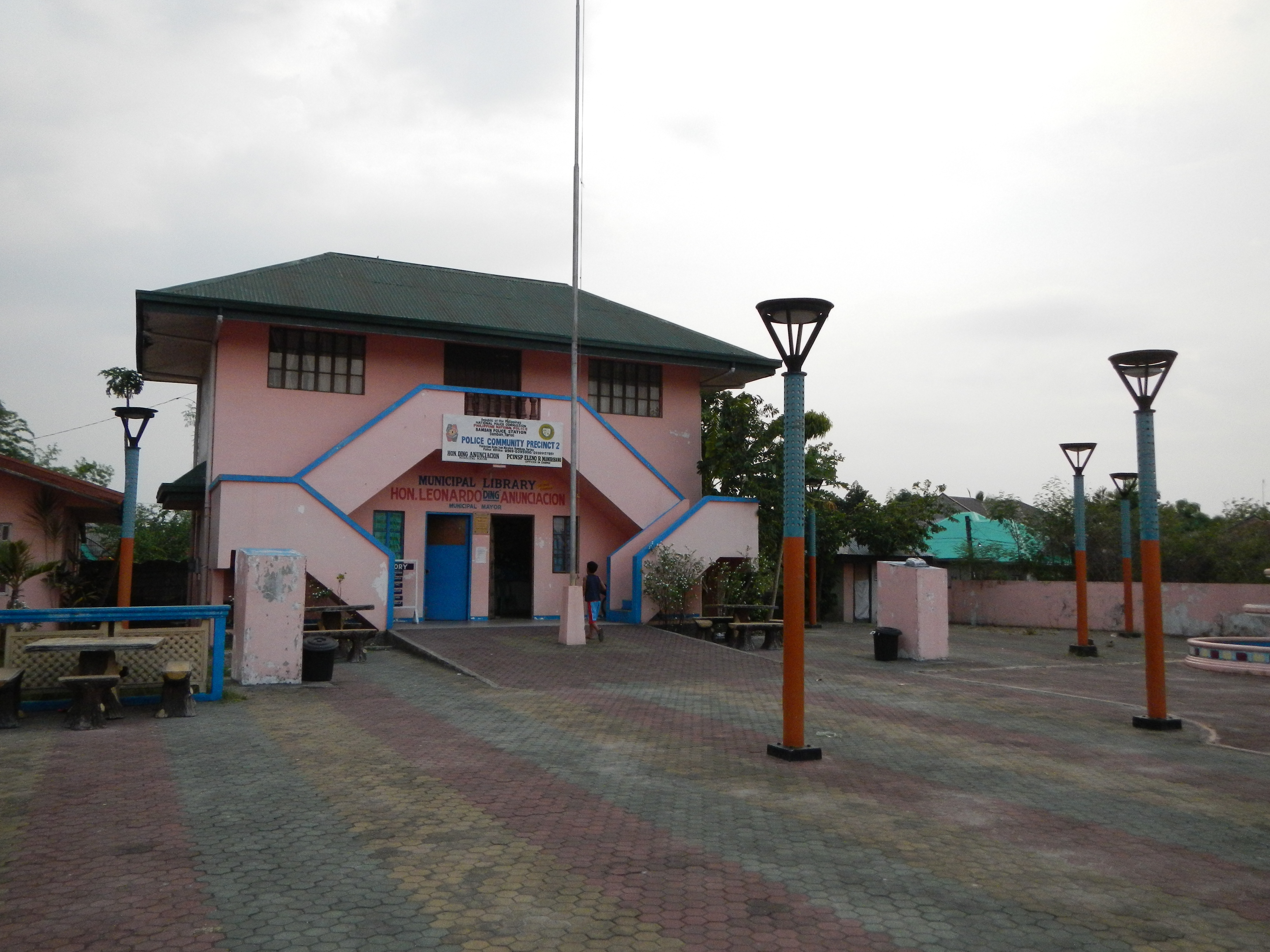
Bamban Municipal Library, (Former Municipal Hall and Municipal Police Station)

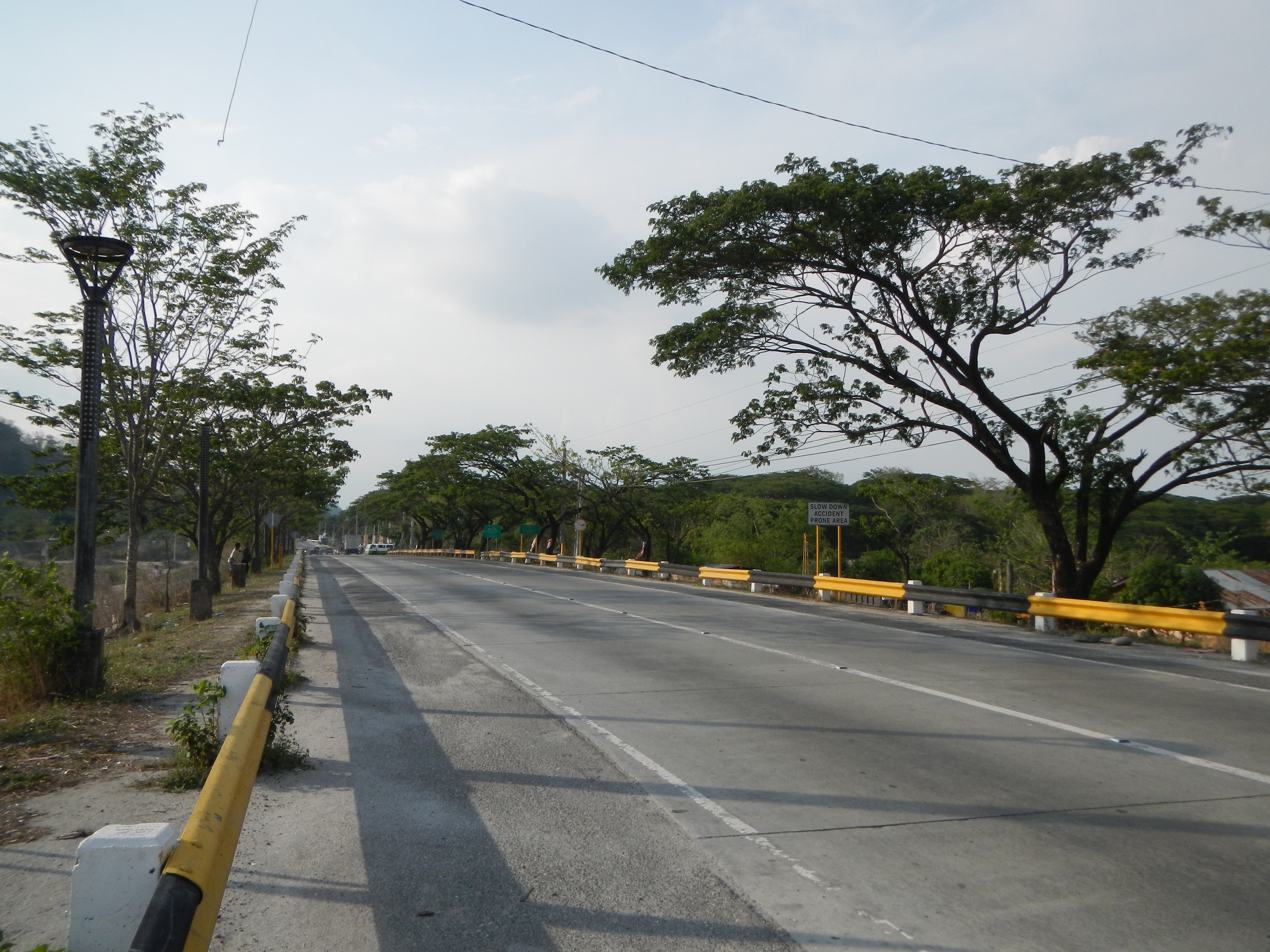
McArthur Highway, Bamban, Tarlac
