= Huaibei (disambiguation) =

Huaibei is a city in Anhui, China.

Huaibei may also refer to:

== Places ==
- Huaibei, Beijing

== Ships ==
- Huaibei, a Type 053H2G frigate
- Huaibei, a Type 054A frigate

== Other uses ==
- Huaibei Mining Group
- Huaibei Normal University

== See also ==
- Huanbei (disambiguation)
