= List of normal schools by country =

List of normal schools by country

This list is incomplete. You can help Wikipedia by expanding it.

== Africa ==
=== Kenya ===
- Strathmore School
- The Green Gardens School
- Consolata School
- Kaaga Girls High School
- St. Mary's School

== Asia ==
=== China ===
The following is a list of normal universities (Chinese: 师范大学) in China.

- Beijing Normal University
- East China Normal University
- Northeast Normal University
- Central China Normal University
- Shaanxi Normal University
- Nanjing Normal University
- South China Normal University
- Hunan Normal University
- Capital Normal University
- Tianjin Normal University
- Tianjin University of Technology and Education
- Hebei Normal University
- Shanxi Normal University
- Inner Mongolia Normal University
- Liaoning Normal University
- Shenyang Normal University
- Jilin Normal University
- Changchun Normal University
- Harbin Normal University
- Shanghai Normal University
- Jiangsu Normal University
- Zhejiang Normal University
- Hangzhou Normal University
- Anhui Normal University
- Fuyang Normal University
- Anqing Normal University
- Anhui Normal University
- Huaibei Normal University
- Fujian Normal University
- Minnan Normal University
- Jiangxi Normal University
- Gannan Normal University
- Jiangxi Science and Technology Normal University
- Shandong Normal University
- Qufu Normal University
- Henan Normal University
- Xinyang Normal University
- Hubei Normal University
- Guangdong Polytechnic Normal University
- Guangxi Normal University
- Nanning Normal University
- Hainan Normal University
- Chongqing Normal University
- Sichuan Normal University
- China West Normal University
- Guizhou Normal University
- Yunnan Normal University
- Northwest Normal University
- Qinghai Normal University
- Ningxia Normal University
- Xinjiang Normal University
- Yili Normal University
- Zhoukou Normal University

=== Hong Kong ===
- Hong Kong Institute of Education
- Faculty of Education, The Chinese University of Hong Kong
- Department of Education Studies, Faculty of Social Sciences, Hong Kong Baptist University
- School of Education and Languages, Hong Kong Metropolitan University
- Faculty of Education, The University of Hong Kong

=== Macau ===
- Faculty of Education, University of Macau
- School of Education, City University of Macau

=== Malaysia ===
- Institut Pendidikan Guru Malaysia training teachers for primary schools in Malaysia.
- Universiti Pendidikan Sultan Idris training teachers for secondary schools in Malaysia

=== Philippines ===
- Adamson University College of Education
- Arellano University School of Education
- Cebu Normal University
- Central Philippine University College of Education
- De La Salle University College of Education
- Leyte Normal University
- National Teachers College
- Pangasinan State University College of Teacher Education, Bayambang
- Philippine Normal University
- Polytechnic University of the Philippines College of Education
- University of Santo Tomas College of Education
- University of the Philippines College of Education
- West Visayas State University College of Education

=== South Korea ===
- Cheju National University College of Education
- Chonbuk National University College of Education
- Chonnam National University College of Education
- Chungbuk National University College of Education
- Chungnam National University College of Education
- Gyeongsang National University College of Education
- Kangwon National University College of Education
- Kyungpook National University College of Education
- Pusan National University College of Education
- Seoul National University College of Education

=== Taiwan ===
- National Changhua University of Education
- National Hsinchu University of Education
- National Kaohsiung Normal University
- National Taichung University (of Education)
- National Tainan University College of Education
- National Taipei University of Education
- National Taiwan Normal University
- Taipei Municipal University of Education

=== Vietnam ===
- Trường Đại học Sư phạm Thành phố Hồ Chí Minh (Ho Chi Minh City Pedagogical University)
- Trường Đại học Sư phạm Hà Nội (Hanoi National University of Education)
- Trường Đại học Sư phạm Huế (Hue University of Education)

== Europe ==
=== Finland ===
In Finland, every Faculty of Education has one or several normal schools (Finnish: normaalikoulu) to give aspiring teachers a chance for teaching practice as a part of their academic curriculum. The schools may, depending on the type of teachers educated, offer education for pupils in age groups 7–12, 13–19 or both. Administratively, the schools are part of their universities, but the pupils for the schools are accepted as to usual municipal schools. The academic curriculum followed by the pupils is the same as in all other schools of the same type, but the normal schools frequently engage in research programs which may necessitate minor curriculum alterations.

- Helsingin normaalilyseo, University of Helsinki
- Helsingin yliopiston Viikin normaalikoulu, University of Helsinki
- Hämeenlinnan normaalikoulu, University of Tampere
- Joensuun normaalikoulu, University of Joensuu
- Jyväskylän normaalikoulu, University of Jyväskylä
- Kajaanin normaalikoulu, University of Oulu
- Lapin yliopiston harjoittelukoulu, University of Lapland
- Oulun normaalikoulu, University of Oulu
- Rauman normaalikoulu, University of Turku
- Savonlinnan normaalikoulu, University of Joensuu
- Tampereen normaalikoulu, University of Tampere
- Turun normaalikoulu, University of Turku
- Vasa övningsskola, Swedish-speaking, Åbo Akademi

=== France ===
- Ecole Normale

=== Italy ===
- Scuola Normale Superiore di Pisa

=== Lithuania ===
- Lietuvos edukologijos universitetas Lithuanian University of Educational Sciences

=== United Kingdom ===
- Bangor Normal College
- Royal Normal College for the Blind

== North America ==
=== Canada ===
- Edmonton Normal School
- New Brunswick Teachers' College (formerly "normal school")
- Nova Scotia Teachers College (formerly "normal school")
- Ottawa Normal School
- Regina Normal School
- Toronto Normal School
- See main article in Normal school under entry for Canada for complete list.

=== Jamaica ===
- Mico University College

=== United States ===
- Alabama Agricultural and Mechanical University formerly State Normal and Industrial School
- Albion State Normal School closed 1951
- Anniston Normal and Industrial School in Anniston, Alabama, closed c. 1915
- Arizona State University, founded as Territorial Normal School. Later Arizona Territorial Normal School, Arizona Normal School, Normal School of Arizona, Tempe Normal School, Tempe State Teachers College, Arizona State Teachers College, and Arizona State College. ASU's teacher training program is now housed in its Mary Lou Fulton Teachers College.
- Bridgewater State College, formerly Bridgewater Normal School
- Ball State University, Teachers College
- Bowling Green State University, Bowling Green, Ohio, formerly Bowling Green State Normal School
- University of Central Missouri, Warrensburg, Missouri – Founded as State Normal School, Second District. Later Warrensburg Teachers College, Central Missouri State Normal School, Central Missouri State Teachers College, Central Missouri State College, and Central Missouri State University.
- University of Central Oklahoma Formerly Territorial Normal School, Central State Normal School, Central State Teacher's College, Central State College, Central State University
- Central Washington University, Ellensburg, Washington, Formerly Washington State Normal School
- Chadron State College, Chadron, Nebraska
- Concordia Normal School closed 1876
- Concord University, Athens, West Virginia – Founded in 1872 as Concord Branch of the State Normal School. Later known as Concord State Normal School, Concord State Teachers College, and Concord College.
- Teachers College, Columbia University
- Eastern Illinois University, Charleston, Illinois Formerly Eastern Illinois Normal School
- Eastern Kentucky University, Richmond, Kentucky – Founded as Eastern Kentucky State Normal School. Later Eastern Kentucky State Normal School and Teachers College, Eastern Kentucky Teachers College, and Eastern Kentucky State College. See also Model Laboratory School, a K-12 school operated by EKU as part of its teacher training program.
- Eastern Michigan University, Ypsilanti, Michigan Formerly Michigan State Normal School
- East Tennessee State University Formerly East Tennessee State Normal School
- Emporia State University, Emporia, Kansas Formerly Kansas Normal School and Emporia State Teachers College
- Fairmont State University, Fairmont, West Virginia – Founded as the private West Virginia Normal School. Soon taken over by the state and became a branch of the State Normal School of Marshall College (modern-day Marshall University). Later known as Fairmont Normal School, the Fairmont Branch of the West Virginia Normal School, the Branch of the West Virginia Normal School at Fairmont, Fairmont State Normal School, Fairmont State Teachers College, and Fairmont State College.
- Framingham State College Formerly State Normal School at Framingham and Framingham Normal School
- Georgia Southern University, Statesboro, Georgia – Founded in 1906 as a regional agricultural school, First District Agricultural & Mechanical School. Mission changed in 1924 to that of a normal school, with the school name changing to Georgia Normal School. Later South Georgia Teachers College, Georgia Teachers College, and Georgia Southern College.
- Harris-Stowe State University, St. Louis, Missouri – Formed as a merger of the historically white Harris Teachers College and the historically black Sumner Normal School, later Stowe Teachers College.
- Hunter College, CUNY - Founded as Female Normal and High School. Later Normal College of the City of New York.
- Indiana State University, Terre Haute, Indiana Formerly Indiana State Normal School
- Illinois State University, Normal, Illinois Formerly Illinois State Normal School
- James Madison University, Harrisonburg, Virginia – Founded as The State Normal and Industrial School for Women. Later The State Normal and Industrial School for Women at Harrisonburg, State Normal School for Women at Harrisonburg, State Teachers College at Harrisonburg, and Madison College.
- Kent State University, Kent, Ohio Formerly Kent State Normal School
- Leavenworth Normal School closed 1876
- Lewis-Clark State College Formerly Lewiston State Normal School in Lewiston, Idaho
- Longwood University, Farmville, Virginia – Founded as the Farmville Female Seminary Association. Became a college as Farmville Female College. Became the Normal School when taken over by the Commonwealth of Virginia. Later the State Normal School for Women at Farmville, State Teachers College at Farmville, and Longwood College.
- University of Mary Washington, Fredericksburg, Virginia – Founded as The State Normal and Industrial School for Women at Fredericksburg. Later Mary Washington College.
- University of Memphis, Memphis, Tennessee – Founded as West Tennessee Normal School. Later West Tennessee State Teachers College, Memphis State College, and Memphis State University.
- Minnesota State University Formerly Mankato State Normal School, Mankato State Teachers College, Mankato State College, and Mankato State University
- Missouri State University, Springfield, Missouri – Founded as Fourth District Normal School. Later Southwest Missouri State Teacher's College, Southwest Missouri State College, and Southwest Missouri State University.
- Montclair State University Formerly New Jersey State Normal School at Montclair
- Morehead State University, Morehead, Kentucky – Founded as Morehead Normal School. Later Morehead State Normal School and Teachers College, Morehead State Teachers College, and Morehead State College.
- Murray State University, Murray, Kentucky – Founded as Murray State Normal School. Later Murray State Normal School and Teachers College, Murray State Teachers College, and Murray State College.
- the University of North Carolina at Greensboro - Founded as State Normal and Industrial School. Later State Normal and Industrial College, North Carolina College for Women, and Woman's College of the University of North Carolina.
- University of North Texas, Denton, Texas – Founded as Texas Normal College and Teacher Training Institute. Later North Texas State Normal College, North Texas State Teachers College, North Texas State College, and North Texas State University.
- Northeastern Illinois University Formerly Teacher Training School, The Normal School, Chicago Normal School, Chicago Teachers College, North Side Teachers College, Illinois Teachers' College North, and Northeastern Illinois State College
- University of Northern Colorado, College of Education & Behavioral Sciences Formerly The Colorado State Normal School, the Colorado Teacher's College, the Colorado State College of Education, and Colorado State College
- Northern Illinois University Formerly Northern Illinois State Normal School
- University of Northern Iowa, Formerly Iowa State Normal School and Iowa State Teachers College
- Northwest Missouri State University, Maryville, Missouri – Founded as Fifth District Normal School. Later Northwest Missouri State Teacher's College and Northwest Missouri State College.
- Northwestern State University Formerly Louisiana State Normal School, Louisiana State Normal College, and Northwestern State College of Louisiana
- Peru State College Formerly Nebraska State Normal School, Nebraska State Teachers College, and Peru State Teachers College
- Ohio Northern University Formerly Northwestern Ohio Normal School
- Peabody College of Education and Human Development, Vanderbilt University – Founded as Peabody Normal College in 1875 when the University of Nashville split into two institutions, a preparatory school and a standalone college. Soon became George Peabody College for Teachers and retained that name until merging with Vanderbilt in 1979.
- Radford University, Radford, Virginia – Formerly State Normal and Industrial School for Women at Radford and State Teachers College at Radford
- Rowan University Formerly Rowan College, Glassboro State College, New Jersey State Teachers College at Glassboro, and Glassboro Normal School Founded in 1923
- Sabine Normal and Industrial Institute, Converse, Louisiana, a Black school founded in 1903 and closed in 1928
- Salina Normal University, closed 1904
- San Diego State University, San Diego – Formerly San Diego Normal School
- San Jose State University Formerly Minns Evening Normal School, California State Normal School, California State Normal School at San Jose, California State Teachers College at San Jose, and San Jose State College
- Shepherd University, Shepherdstown, West Virginia – Founded in 1871 as Shepherd College, but converted to Shepherd Branch of the State Normal School the following year. Later known as Shepherd Teachers College and Shepherd College.
- Slippery Rock University Formerly Slippery Rock Normal School and Slippery Rock State Teachers College
- Southeast Missouri State University, Cape Girardeau, Missouri – Founded as Southeast Missouri State Normal School. Later Third District Normal School, Southeast Missouri State Teachers College, and Southeast Missouri State College.
- Southern Illinois University Carbondale, Carbondale, Illinois – Founded as Southern Illinois Normal College. Later Southern Illinois Normal College and Southern Illinois University. The city name was added when SIU opened a second campus in Edwardsville.
- State Normal School (Athens, Georgia)
- Texas State University, San Marcos, Texas – Founded as Southwest Texas State Normal School. Later Southwest Texas State Teachers College, Southwest Texas State College, Southwest Texas State University, and Texas State University-San Marcos.
- Towson University Formerly Maryland State Normal School, State Teachers College at Towson, Towson State College, and Towson State University
- Truman State University, Kirksville, Missouri – Formerly North Missouri Normal School, Northeast Missouri State University
- Turner Normal and Industrial School, Shelbyville, Tennessee – formerly known as Turner Industrial School, Turner Normal School, and Turner College
- University of California, Los Angeles (UCLA) Formerly Los Angeles State Normal School
- Valley City State University Formerly Valley City State Teachers College, Valley City State College
- West Liberty University, West Liberty, West Virginia – Founded in 1837 as West Liberty Academy. Later converted to a normal school as West Liberty State Teachers College, and became West Liberty State College when it expanded to include liberal arts programs.
- Western Colorado University, Gunnison, Colorado – Founded as The Colorado State Normal School for Children. Later Western State College when it expanded to include liberal arts programs, and still later Western State Colorado University.
- Western Illinois University, Macomb, Illinois, Formerly Western Illinois State Normal School
- Western Kentucky University, Bowling Green, Kentucky – Founded as Glasgow Normal School. Later Southern Normal School and Business College, Western Kentucky State Normal School and Teachers College, Western Kentucky State Teachers College, and Western Kentucky State College.
- Western Michigan University, Kalamazoo, Michigan Formerly Western State Normal School
- Western Washington University Founded as New Whatcom State Normal School, then Washington State Normal School Bellingham, Woodring College of Education

== South America ==
=== Colombia ===
- Gimnasio Moderno
- Chapinero's English Royal School
