= 17th Congress of the Philippines =

38th legislative term of the Philippines

←	16th	18th	→
- GSIS Building (2010) (top) and Batasang Pambansa Complex (2010) (bottom)

Overview
- Term: July 25, 2016 – June 4, 2019
- President: Rodrigo Duterte
- Vice President: Leni Robredo

Senate
- Members: 24
- President: Koko Pimentel (until May 21, 2018); Tito Sotto (from May 21, 2018)
- President pro tempore: Franklin Drilon (until February 27, 2017); Ralph Recto (from February 27, 2017)
- Majority leader: Tito Sotto (until May 21, 2018); Juan Miguel Zubiri (from May 21, 2018)
- Minority leader: Ralph Recto (until February 27, 2017); Franklin Drilon (from February 28, 2017)

House of Representatives
- Members: 297
- Speaker: Pantaleon Alvarez (until July 23, 2018); Gloria Macapagal Arroyo (from July 23, 2018)
- Deputy Speakers: Eric Singson (until August 29, 2018); Mercedes Alvarez; Fredenil Castro (until January 21, 2019); Raneo Abu; Miro Quimbo (until July 25, 2018); Gloria Macapagal Arroyo (August 15, 2016 – March 15, 2017); Pia Cayetano (from August 15, 2016); Gwendolyn Garcia (August 15, 2016 – August 15, 2018); Mylene Garcia-Albano (from August 15, 2016); Sharon Garin (from August 15, 2016); Bai Sandra Sema (from August 15, 2016); Dinand Hernandez (from August 16, 2016); Frederick Abueg (from August 16, 2016); Rolando Andaya Jr. (August 16, 2016 – July 30, 2018); Linabelle Villarica (from August 9, 2017); Prospero Pichay Jr. (from August 15, 2018); Arthur C. Yap (from August 15, 2018); Rose Marie Arenas (from August 29, 2018); Evelina Escudero (from August 29, 2018); Randolph Ting (from January 21, 2019)
- Majority leader: Rodolfo Fariñas (until July 23, 2018); Fredenil Castro (acting: July 23–30, 2018, and from January 21, 2019); Rolando Andaya Jr. (July 30, 2018 – January 21, 2019)
- Minority leader: Danilo Suarez

The 17th Congress of the Philippines (Filipino: Ikalabimpitong Kongreso ng Pilipinas), composed of the Philippine Senate and House of Representatives, met from July 25, 2016, until June 4, 2019, during the first three years of Rodrigo Duterte's presidency. The convening of the 17th Congress followed the 2016 general elections, which replaced half of the Senate membership and the entire membership of the House of Representatives.

== Leadership ==
=== Senate ===
Senate President

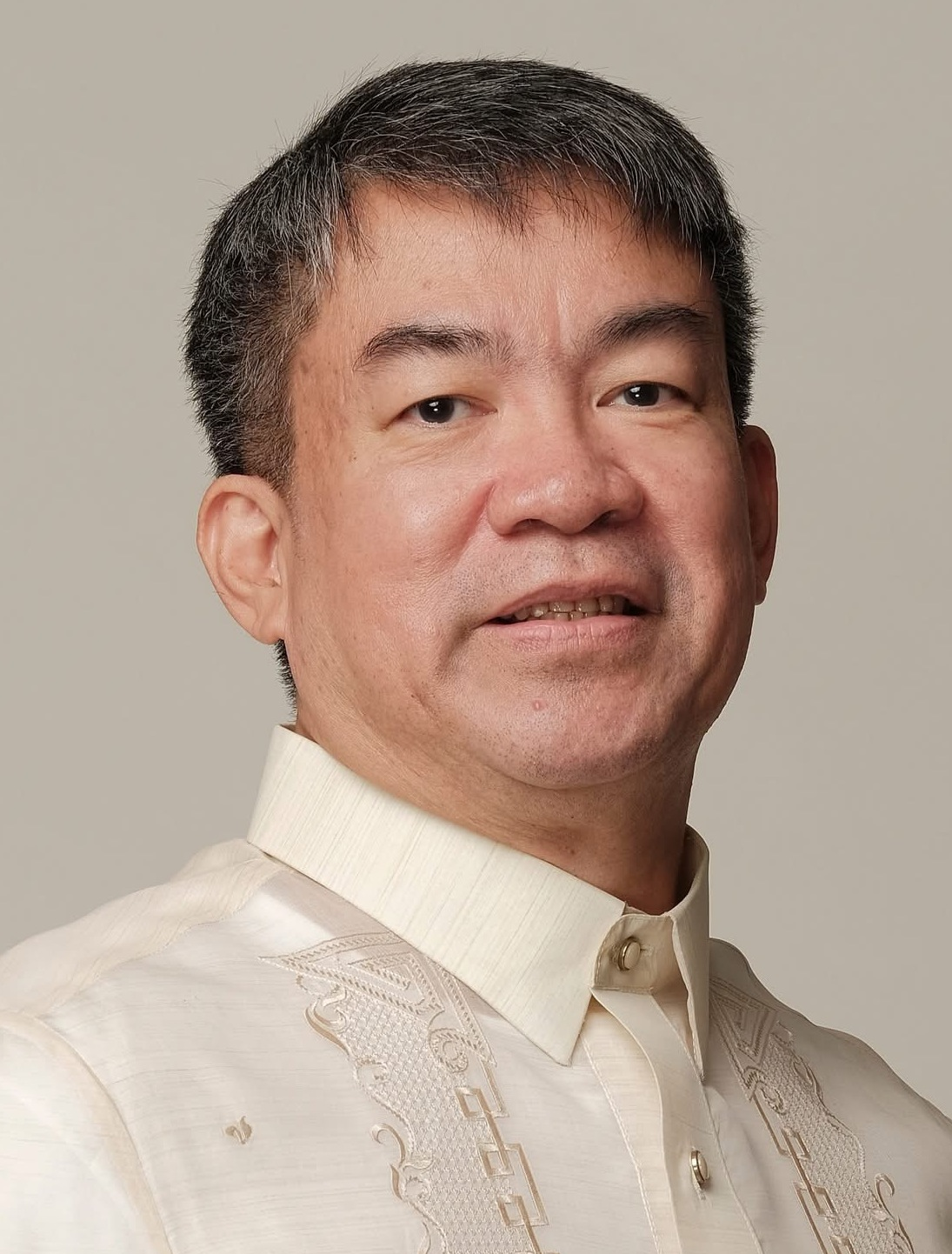
Koko Pimentel,
until May 21, 2018

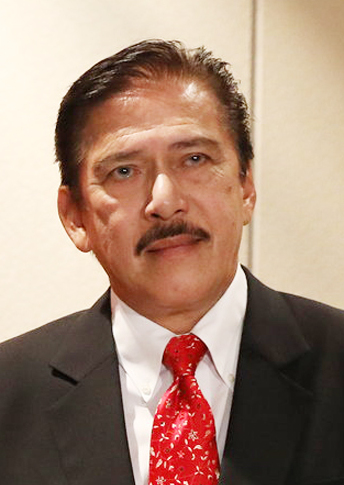
Tito Sotto,
from May 21, 2018

- President:
  - Koko Pimentel (PDP–Laban), until May 21, 2018
  - Tito Sotto (NPC), from May 21, 2018
- President pro tempore:
  - Franklin Drilon (Liberal), until February 27, 2017
  - Ralph Recto (Nacionalista), from February 27, 2017
- Majority Floor Leader:
  - Tito Sotto (NPC), until May 21, 2018
  - Juan Miguel Zubiri (Independent), from May 21, 2018
- Minority Floor Leader:
  - Ralph Recto (Liberal), until February 27, 2017
  - Franklin Drilon (Liberal), from February 28, 2017

=== House of Representatives ===
House Speaker

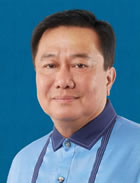
Pantaleon Alvarez,
until July 23, 2018

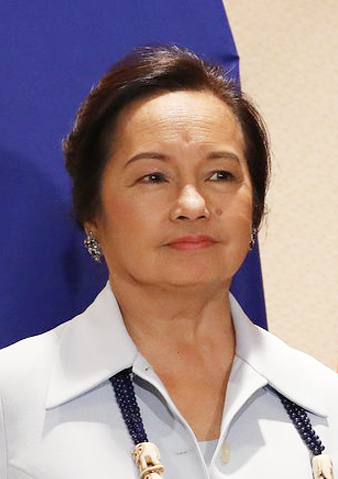
Gloria Macapagal Arroyo,
from July 23, 2018

- Speaker:
  - Pantaleon Alvarez (Davao del Norte–1st, PDP–Laban), until July 23, 2018
  - Gloria Macapagal Arroyo (Pampanga–2nd, PDP–Laban), from July 23, 2018
- Deputy Speakers:
  - Eric Singson (Ilocos Sur–2nd, PDP–Laban), until August 29, 2018
  - Mercedes Alvarez (Negros Occidental–6th, NPC)
  - Fredenil Castro (Capiz–2nd, NUP), until January 21, 2019
  - Raneo Abu (Batangas–2nd, Nacionalista)
  - Miro Quimbo (Marikina–2nd, Liberal), until July 25, 2018
  - Gloria Macapagal Arroyo (Pampanga–2nd, Lakas), August 15, 2016 – March 15, 2017
  - Pia Cayetano (Taguig–2nd, Nacionalista), from August 15, 2016
  - Gwendolyn Garcia (Cebu–3rd, PDP–Laban), August 15, 2016 – August 15, 2018
  - Mylene Garcia-Albano (Davao City–2nd, PDP–Laban), from August 15, 2016
  - Sharon Garin (Party-list, AAMBIS-Owa), from August 15, 2016
  - Bai Sandra Sema (Maguindanao–1st, PDP–Laban), from August 15, 2016
  - Dinand Hernandez (South Cotabato–2nd, NPC), from August 16, 2016
  - Frederick Abueg (Palawan–2nd, Liberal), from August 16, 2016
  - Rolando Andaya Jr. (Camarines Sur–1st, PDP–Laban), August 16, 2016 – July 30, 2018
  - Linabelle Villarica (Bulacan–4th, Liberal), from August 9, 2017
  - Prospero Pichay Jr. (Surigao del Sur–1st, Lakas), from August 15, 2018
  - Arthur C. Yap (Bohol–3rd, PDP–Laban), from August 15, 2018
  - Rose Marie Arenas (Pangasinan–3rd, PDP–Laban), from August 29, 2018
  - Evelina Escudero (Sorsogon–1st, NPC), from August 29, 2018
  - Randolph Ting (Cagayan–3rd, NUP), from January 21, 2019
- Majority Leader:
  - Rodolfo Fariñas (Ilocos Norte–1st, PDP–Laban), until July 23, 2018
  - Fredenil Castro (Capiz–2nd, NUP), acting: July 23–30, 2018, and from January 21, 2019
  - Rolando Andaya Jr. (Camarines Sur-1st, PDP–Laban), July 30, 2018 – January 21, 2019
- Minority Leader: Danilo Suarez (Quezon–3rd, Lakas)

== Sessions ==
- First regular session: July 25, 2016 – May 31, 2017
- Second regular session: July 24, 2017 – May 30, 2018
- Third regular session: July 23, 2018 – May 27, 2019

== Composition ==
Both chambers of Congress are divided into parties and blocs. While members are elected via parties, blocs are the basis for committee memberships. Only members of the majority and minority blocs are accorded committee memberships. This is how blocs are determined:

- Majority bloc: All members who voted for the Senate President or Speaker during the Senate presidential or speakership election.
- Minority bloc: All members who voted for the second-placed candidate during the Senate presidential or speakership election.
- Independent minority bloc: All members who did not vote for the winning or second-best nominee during the Senate presidential or speakership election.
- Independent bloc: All members who abstained from voting during the Senate presidential or speakership election.
- Not a member of any bloc: All members who have not voted during the Senate presidential or speakership election.

In the speakership election, several members abstained from voting. They, along with the members who voted for the losing candidate voted on who would be the minority leader.

=== Senate ===
Senate

Per Party
Party	2016 election results	Current
Liberal	6	5
Nacionalista	3	3
NPC	3	3
PDP–Laban	1	2
UNA	3	1
Akbayan	1	1
LDP	1	1
PMP	1	1
Independent	5	5
Total members	24	22
Vacant	0	2
Total seats	24	

Per Bloc
Party	Majority	Minority
Liberal	1	4
Nacionalista	2	1
PDP–Laban	2	0
NPC	3	0
UNA	1	0
Akbayan	0	1
LDP	1	0
PMP	1	0
Independent	5	0
Total	17	6

=== House of Representatives ===
House of Representatives

Per Party
Party	2016 election results	End of Congress
PDP–Laban	3	94
Party-list	59	59
Nacionalista	24	37
NPC	42	33
NUP	23	28
Liberal	115	18
Local parties	9	7
Lakas	4	5
LDP	2	3
Hugpong	0	3
PFP	0	2
PMP	0	1
Independent	4	1
UNA	11	0
Aksyon	1	0
Total members	297	291
Vacant	0	6
Total seats	297	

Per Bloc
Party	Majority	Minority	Independent minority	Independent
PDP–Laban	92	2	0	0
Party-list	34	15	10	0
Nacionalista	36	1	0	0
NPC	32	1	0	0
NUP	28	0	0	0
Liberal	5	0	13	0
Local parties	5	0	1	1
Lakas	4	1	0	0
LDP	3	0	0	0
Hugpong	3	0	0	0
PFP	2	0	0	0
PMP	1	0	0	0
Independent	0	1	0	0
Total	245	21	24	1

== Membership ==
=== Senate ===
The following are the terms of the senators of this Congress, according to the date of election:

- For senators elected on May 13, 2013: June 30, 2013 – June 30, 2019
- For senators elected on May 9, 2016: June 30, 2016 – June 30, 2022

Senator	Party	Term	Term end	Bloc	Registered in
Sonny Angara	LDP	1	2019	Majority	Baler, Aurora
Bam Aquino	Liberal	1	2019	Minority	Quezon City
Nancy Binay	UNA	1	2019	Majority	Makati
Alan Peter Cayetano (Note: Alan Peter Cayetano resigned on May 17, 2017, upon being appointed as Secretary of Foreign Affairs.)	Nacionalista	2	2019	Majority	Taguig
Leila de Lima (Note: Leila de Lima was detained on February 24, 2017, for charges linked to the New Bilibid Prison drug trafficking scandal.)	Liberal	1	2022	Minority	Iriga, Camarines Sur
Franklin Drilon	Liberal	2	2022	Minority	Iloilo City
JV Ejercito	NPC (Note: JV Ejercito was affiliated with the Pwersa ng Masang Pilipino until 2018.)	1	2019	Majority	San Juan
Francis Escudero	NPC (Note: Francis Escudero was an independent until 2018.)	2	2019	Majority	Sorsogon City, Sorsogon
Win Gatchalian	NPC	1	2022	Majority	Valenzuela
Dick Gordon	Independent	1	2022	Majority	Olongapo
Gregorio Honasan	UNA	2	2019	Majority	Marikina
Risa Hontiveros	Akbayan	1	2022	Minority	Manila
Panfilo Lacson	Independent	1	2022	Majority	Imus, Cavite
Loren Legarda	NPC	2	2019	Majority	Pandan, Antique
Manny Pacquiao	PDP–Laban	1	2022	Majority	Kiamba, Sarangani
Kiko Pangilinan	Liberal	1	2022	Minority	Quezon City
Koko Pimentel	PDP–Laban	1	2019	Majority	Cagayan de Oro
Grace Poe	Independent	1	2019	Majority	San Juan
Ralph Recto	Nacionalista (Note: Ralph Recto was affiliated with the Liberal Party until 2018.)	2	2022	Majority	Lipa, Batangas
Tito Sotto	NPC	2	2022	Majority	Quezon City
Antonio Trillanes	Nacionalista	2	2019	Minority	Caloocan
Joel Villanueva	Liberal	1	2022	Majority	Bocaue, Bulacan
Cynthia Villar	Nacionalista	1	2019	Majority	Las Piñas
Juan Miguel Zubiri	Independent	1	2022	Majority	Malaybalay, Bukidnon

=== House of Representatives ===
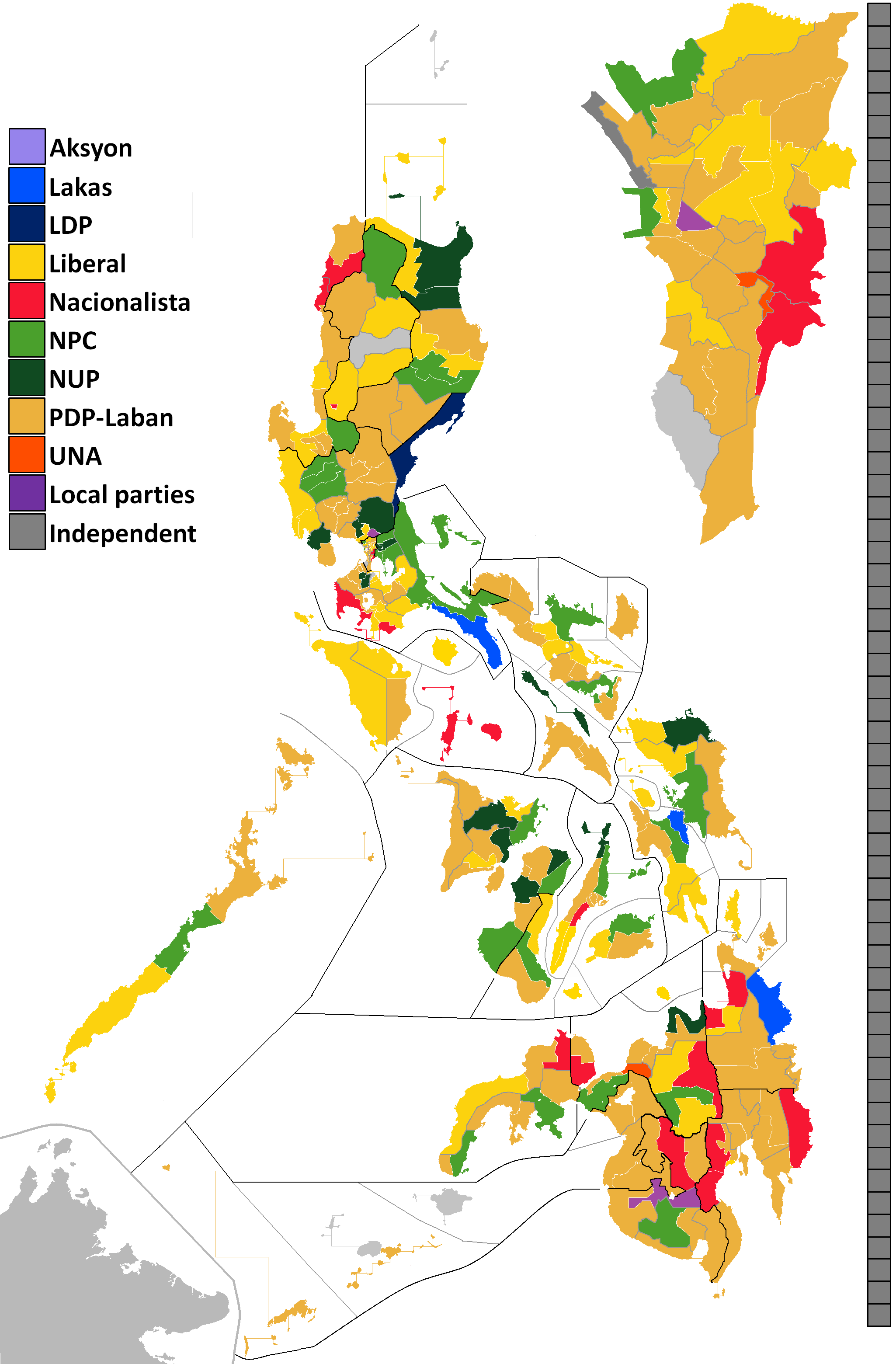
Parties that hold the seats in each legislative district and party-list in the 17th Congress. Party-list seats are denoted by boxes on the right side. Metro Manila is magnified at the upper right corner.

Province/City	District	Representative	Party	Term	Bloc
Abra	Lone	Joseph Bernos	Asenso Abrenio (Note: Affiliated with the Liberal Party at election.)	1	Majority
Agusan del Norte	1st	Lawrence Fortun	Nacionalista	2	Majority
Agusan del Norte	2nd	Erlpe John Amante	Nacionalista	2	Majority
Agusan del Sur	1st	Maria Valentina Plaza	PDP–Laban (Note: Affiliated with the National Unity Party at election.)	3	Majority
Agusan del Sur	2nd	Evelyn Plaza-Mellana	PDP–Laban	3	Majority
Aklan	Lone	Carlito Marquez	NPC	1	Majority
Albay	1st	Edcel Lagman	Liberal	1	Independent minority
Albay	2nd	Joey Salceda	PDP–Laban	1	Majority
Albay	3rd	Fernando Gonzalez	PDP–Laban	3	Majority
Antipolo	1st	Chiqui Roa-Puno	NUP	1	Majority
Antipolo	2nd	Romeo Acop	NUP	3	Majority
Antique	Lone	Paolo Everardo Javier	PDP–Laban	3	Majority
Apayao	Lone	Eleanor Begtang	PDP–Laban (Note: Affiliated with the Nationalist People's Coalition at election.)	3	Majority
Aurora	Lone	Bella Angara	LDP	2	Majority
Bacolod	Lone	Greg Gasataya	NPC	1	Majority
Baguio	Lone	Mark Go	Nacionalista	1	Majority
Basilan	Lone	Jum Jainudin Akbar (Note: Jum Jainudin Akbar died on November 11, 2016.)	Liberal	1	Majority
Bataan	1st	Geraldine Roman	PDP–Laban	1	Majority
Bataan	2nd	Joet Garcia	PDP–Laban	1	Majority
Batanes	Lone	Henedina Abad (Note: Henedina Abad died on October 8, 2017.)	Liberal	3	Majority
Batangas	1st	Eileen Ermita-Buhain	Nacionalista	2	Majority
Batangas	2nd	Raneo Abu	Nacionalista	2	Majority
Batangas	3rd	Maria Theresa Collantes	PDP–Laban	1	Majority
Batangas	4th	Lianda Bolilia	Nacionalista	1	Majority
Batangas	5th	Marvey Mariño	Nacionalista	1	Majority
Batangas	6th	Vilma Santos	Nacionalista	1	Majority
Benguet	Lone	Ronald Cosalan	PDP–Laban	3	Majority
Biliran	Lone	Rogelio Espina	Nacionalista	3	Majority
Biñan	Lone	Len Alonte	PDP–Laban	1	Majority
Bohol	1st	Rene Relampagos	NUP	3	Majority
Bohol	2nd	Aris Aumentado	NPC	2	Majority
Bohol	3rd	Arthur C. Yap	PDP–Laban	3	Majority
Bukidnon	1st	Maria Lourdes Acosta-Alba	BPP	2	Majority
Bukidnon	2nd	Florencio Flores Jr.	Nacionalista	3	Majority
Bukidnon	3rd	Manuel Zubiri	BPP	1	Majority
Bukidnon	4th	Rogelio Neil Roque	Nacionalista	2	Majority
Bulacan	1st	Jose Antonio Sy-Alvarado	NUP	1	Majority
Bulacan	2nd	Gavini Pancho	NUP	2	Majority
Bulacan	3rd	Lorna Silverio	NUP	1	Majority
Bulacan	4th	Linabelle Villarica	PDP–Laban	3	Majority
Cagayan	1st	Ramon Nolasco	PDP–Laban	1	Majority
Cagayan	2nd	Baby Alfonso	NUP	3	Majority
Cagayan	3rd	Randolph Ting	NUP	3	Majority
Cagayan de Oro	1st	Rolando Uy	PDP–Laban	2	Majority
Cagayan de Oro	2nd	Maximo Rodriguez Jr.	PDP–Laban (Note: Independent at election.)	1	Majority
Caloocan	1st	Along Malapitan	PDP–Laban	1	Majority
Caloocan	2nd	Edgar Erice	Liberal	2	Independent minority
Camarines Norte	1st	Renato Unico Jr.	NUP	1	Majority
Camarines Norte	2nd	Marisol Panotes	PDP–Laban	1	Majority
Camarines Sur	1st	Rolando Andaya Jr.	NPC	3	Majority
Camarines Sur	2nd	Luis Raymund Villafuerte	Nacionalista	1	Majority
Camarines Sur	3rd	Gabriel Bordado	Liberal	1	Independent minority
Camarines Sur	4th	Arnulfo Fuentebella	NPC	1	Majority
Camarines Sur	5th	Salvio Fortuno	Nacionalista	3	Majority
Camiguin	Lone	Xavier Jesus Romualdo	PDP–Laban	2	Majority
Capiz	1st	Tawi Billones	Liberal	1	Independent minority
Capiz	2nd	Fredenil Castro	NUP	2	Majority
Catanduanes	Lone	Cesar Sarmiento	PDP–Laban	3	Majority
Cavite	1st	Francis Gerald Abaya	Liberal	2	Independent minority
Cavite	2nd	Strike Revilla	NUP (Note: Affiliated with Lakas–CMD at election.)	1	Majority
Cavite	3rd	Alex Advincula	PDP–Laban	2	Majority
Cavite	4th	Jenny Barzaga	NUP	1	Majority
Cavite	5th	Roy Loyola	NPC	3	Majority
Cavite	6th	Luis Ferrer IV	NUP	2	Majority
Cavite	7th	Abraham Tolentino	PDP–Laban	2	Majority
Cebu	1st	Samsam Gullas	Independent (Note: Affiliated with the Nacionalista Party at election.)	2	Minority
Cebu	2nd	Wilfredo Caminero	NUP	2	Majority
Cebu	3rd	Gwendolyn Garcia	PDP–Laban (Note: Affiliated with the United Nationalist Alliance at election.)	2	Majority
Cebu	4th	Benhur Salimbangon	NUP	3	Majority
Cebu	5th	Ramon Durano VI	NPC	1	Majority
Cebu	6th	Jonas Cortes	PDP–Laban	1	Majority
Cebu	7th	Peter John Calderon	NPC	1	Majority
Cebu City	1st	Raul del Mar	Liberal	2	Majority
Cebu City	2nd	Rodrigo Abellanosa	LDP	2	Majority
Compostela Valley	1st	Maricar Zamora	HNP	3	Majority
Compostela Valley	2nd	Ruwel Peter Gonzaga	PDP–Laban	1	Majority
Cotabato	1st	Jesus Sacdalan	PDP–Laban	3	Majority
Cotabato	2nd	Nancy Catamco	PDP–Laban	2	Majority
Cotabato	3rd	Jose Tejada	Nacionalista	2	Majority
Davao City	1st	Karlo Nograles (Note: Karlo Nograles resigned on November 5, 2018, upon being appointed as Cabinet Secretary.)	PDP–Laban	3	Majority
Davao City	2nd	Mylene Garcia-Albano	PDP–Laban	3	Majority
Davao City	3rd	Alberto Ungab	HNP	1	Majority
Davao del Norte	1st	Pantaleon Alvarez	PDP–Laban	1	Majority
Davao del Norte	2nd	Antonio Floirendo Jr.	HNP (Note: Affiliated with Kusog Baryohanon at election.)	1	Majority
Davao del Sur	Lone	Mercedes Cagas	Nacionalista	2	Majority
Davao Occidental	Lone	Lorna Bautista-Bandigan	NPC	1	Majority
Davao Oriental	1st	Corazon Malanyaon	Nacionalista	1	Majority
Davao Oriental	2nd	Joel Mayo Almario	PDP–Laban	1	Majority
Dinagat Islands	Lone	Kaka Bag-ao	Liberal	3	Independent minority
Eastern Samar	Lone	Ben Evardone	PDP–Laban	3	Majority
Guimaras	Lone	Lucille Nava	PDP–Laban	1	Majority
Ifugao	Lone	Teddy Baguilat	Liberal	3	Independent minority
Iligan	Lone	Frederick Siao	Nacionalista	1	Majority
Ilocos Norte	1st	Rodolfo Fariñas	PDP–Laban	3	Majority
Ilocos Norte	2nd	Imelda Marcos	Nacionalista	3	Majority
Ilocos Sur	1st	Deogracias Victor Savellano	Nacionalista	1	Majority
Ilocos Sur	2nd	Eric Singson	Bileg	2	Majority
Iloilo	1st	Richard Garin	Nacionalista	2	Majority
Iloilo	2nd	Arcadio Gorriceta	Liberal	2	Majority
Iloilo	3rd	Arthur Defensor Jr.	PDP–Laban	3	Majority
Iloilo	4th	Ferjenel Biron	Nacionalista	1	Majority
Iloilo	5th	Raul Tupas	Nacionalista	1	Majority
Iloilo City	Lone	Jerry Treñas	NUP	3	Majority
Isabela	1st	Rodolfo Albano III	PDP–Laban	2	Majority
Isabela	2nd	Anna Cristina Go	Nacionalista	3	Majority
Isabela	3rd	Napoleon Dy	NPC	3	Majority
Isabela	4th	Maria Lourdes Aggabao	NPC	1	Majority
Kalinga	Lone	Allen Jesse Mangaoang	Nacionalista	1	Majority
La Union	1st	Pablo Ortega	NPC	1	Majority
La Union	2nd	Sandra Eriguel	PDP–Laban	1	Majority
Laguna	1st	Arlene Arcillas	PDP–Laban	1	Minority
Laguna	2nd	Jun Chipeco	Nacionalista	2	Majority
Laguna	3rd	Sol Aragones	Nacionalista	2	Majority
Laguna	4th	Benjamin Agarao Jr.	PDP–Laban	2	Majority
Lanao del Norte	1st	Mohamad Khalid Dimaporo	PDP–Laban	1	Majority
Lanao del Norte	2nd	Abdullah D. Dimaporo	NPC	2	Majority
Lanao del Sur	1st	Ansaruddin Alonto Adiong	Nacionalista	2	Majority
Lanao del Sur	2nd	Mauyag Papandayan Jr.	PDP–Laban	1	Majority
Lapu-Lapu City	Lone	Aileen Radaza	PDP–Laban	2	Majority
Las Piñas	Lone	Mark Villar (Note: Mark Villar resigned on August 1, 2016, upon being appointed as Secretary of Public Works and Highways.)	Nacionalista	3	Majority
Leyte	1st	Yedda Marie Romualdez	Lakas	1	Majority
Leyte	2nd	Henry Ong	PDP–Laban	1	Majority
Leyte	3rd	Vicente Veloso III	NUP	1	Majority
Leyte	4th	Lucy Torres-Gomez	PDP–Laban	2	Majority
Leyte	5th	Jose Carlos Cari	PFP	3	Majority
Maguindanao	1st	Bai Sandra Sema	PDP–Laban	3	Majority
Maguindanao	2nd	Zajid Mangudadatu	PDP–Laban	2	Majority
Makati	1st	Monsour del Rosario	PDP–Laban	1	Majority
Makati	2nd	Luis Campos	NPC	1	Minority
Malabon	Lone	Ricky Sandoval	PDP–Laban	1	Majority
Mandaluyong	Lone	Alexandria Gonzales	PDP–Laban	1	Majority
Manila	1st	Manny Lopez	NPC	1	Majority
Manila	2nd	Carlo Lopez	PDP–Laban	3	Majority
Manila	3rd	Yul Servo	PDP–Laban (Note: Affiliated with Asenso Manileño at election.)	1	Majority
Manila	4th	Edward Maceda	PMP	1	Majority
Manila	5th	Cristal Bagatsing	KABAKA	1	Majority
Manila	6th	Rosenda Ann Ocampo	PDP–Laban	3	Majority
Marikina	1st	Bayani Fernando	NPC	1	Majority
Marikina	2nd	Miro Quimbo	Liberal	3	Independent minority
Marinduque	Lone	Lord Allan Velasco	PDP–Laban	1	Majority
Masbate	1st	Maria Vida Espinosa-Bravo	NUP	2	Majority
Masbate	2nd	Olga Kho	PDP–Laban	2	Majority
Masbate	3rd	Scott Davies Lanete	NPC	3	Majority
Misamis Occidental	1st	Jorge Almonte	Nacionalista	3	Majority
Misamis Occidental	2nd	Henry Oaminal	Nacionalista	2	Majority
Misamis Oriental	1st	Peter Unabia	PDP–Laban	3	Majority
Misamis Oriental	2nd	Juliette Uy	NUP	2	Majority
Mountain Province	Lone	Maximo Dalog (Note: Maximo Dalog died on June 3, 2017.)	Liberal	3	Majority
Muntinlupa	Lone	Ruffy Biazon	PDP–Laban	1	Majority
Navotas	Lone	Toby Tiangco	Navoteño	3	Independent
Negros Occidental	1st	Melecio Yap	NPC	1	Majority
Negros Occidental	2nd	Leo Rafael Cueva	NUP	2	Majority
Negros Occidental	3rd	Albee Benitez	PDP–Laban	3	Majority
Negros Occidental	4th	Juliet Marie Ferrer	NUP	1	Majority
Negros Occidental	5th	Alejandro Mirasol	Lakas	3	Majority
Negros Occidental	6th	Mercedes Lansang	NPC	3	Majority
Negros Oriental	1st	Jocelyn Sy-Limkaichong	Liberal	1	Independent minority
Negros Oriental	2nd	Chiquiting Sagarbarria	NPC	1	Majority
Negros Oriental	3rd	Arnie Teves	PDP–Laban	1	Majority
Northern Samar	1st	Raul Daza	Liberal	1	Independent minority
Northern Samar	2nd	Edwin Ongchuan	NUP	1	Majority
Nueva Ecija	1st	Estrellita Suansing	PDP–Laban	2	Majority
Nueva Ecija	2nd	Micaela Violago	NUP	1	Majority
Nueva Ecija	3rd	Rosanna Vergara	PDP–Laban	1	Majority
Nueva Ecija	4th	Magnolia Antonino-Nadres	NUP	2	Majority
Nueva Vizcaya	Lone	Luisa Cuaresma	NUP	1	Majority
Occidental Mindoro	Lone	Josephine Sato	Liberal	2	Independent minority
Oriental Mindoro	1st	Paulino Salvador Leachon	PDP–Laban	2	Majority
Oriental Mindoro	2nd	Reynaldo Umali	PFP	3	Majority
Palawan	1st	Franz Alvarez	NUP	2	Majority
Palawan	2nd	Frederick Abueg	PDP–Laban	2	Majority
Palawan	3rd	Gil Acosta	NPC	1	Majority
Pampanga	1st	Carmelo Lazatin II	PDP–Laban (Note: Affiliated with Lingap Lugud at election.)	1	Majority
Pampanga	2nd	Gloria Macapagal Arroyo	PDP–Laban	3	Majority
Pampanga	3rd	Aurelio Gonzales Jr.	PDP–Laban	1	Majority
Pampanga	4th	Juan Pablo Bondoc	PDP–Laban	2	Majority
Pangasinan	1st	Jesus Celeste	PDP–Laban	3	Majority
Pangasinan	2nd	Leopoldo Bataoil	NUP	3	Majority
Pangasinan	3rd	Rose Marie Arenas	PDP–Laban	2	Majority
Pangasinan	4th	Christopher de Venecia	Lakas	1	Majority
Pangasinan	5th	Amado Espino Jr.	PDP–Laban (Note: Affiliated with Aksyon Demokratiko at election.)	1	Majority
Pangasinan	6th	Marlyn Primicias-Agabas	NPC	3	Majority
Parañaque	1st	Eric Olivarez	PDP–Laban	2	Majority
Parañaque	2nd	Gustavo Tambunting	PDP–Laban	2	Majority
Pasay	Lone	Emi Rubiano	PDP–Laban	3	Majority
Pasig	Lone	Richard Eusebio	Nacionalista	1	Minority
Quezon	1st	Trina Enverga	NPC	1	Majority
Quezon	2nd	Vicente Alcala	PDP–Laban	2	Majority
Quezon	3rd	Danilo Suarez	Lakas	1	Minority
Quezon	4th	Angelina Tan	NPC	2	Majority
Quezon City	1st	Vincent Crisologo	PDP–Laban	1	Majority
Quezon City	2nd	Winston Castelo	SBP	3	Majority
Quezon City	3rd	Jorge Banal Jr.	SBP	3	Independent minority
Quezon City	4th	Feliciano Belmonte Jr.	Liberal	3	Majority
Quezon City	5th	Alfred Vargas	PDP–Laban	2	Majority
Quezon City	6th	Kit Belmonte	Liberal	2	Independent minority
Quirino	Lone	Dakila Cua	PDP–Laban	3	Majority
Rizal	1st	Jack Duavit	NPC	1	Majority
Rizal	2nd	Isidro Rodriguez Jr.	NPC	3	Majority
Romblon	Lone	Emmanuel Madrona	Nacionalista	1	Majority
Samar	1st	Edgar Mary Sarmiento	Liberal	1	Majority
Samar	2nd	Milagrosa Tan	PDP–Laban	2	Majority
San Jose del Monte	Lone	Florida Robes	PDP–Laban (Note: Affiliated with Arangkada San Joseño at election.)	1	Majority
San Juan	Lone	Ronaldo Zamora	PDP–Laban	2	Majority
Sarangani	Lone	Rogelio Pacquiao	PDP–Laban (Note: Affiliated with the People's Champ Movement at election.)	1	Majority
Siquijor	Lone	Ramon Vicente Rocamora	PDP–Laban	1	Majority
Sorsogon	1st	Evelina Escudero	NPC	2	Majority
Sorsogon	2nd	Deogracias Ramos Jr.	PDP–Laban	3	Majority
South Cotabato	1st	Pedro Acharon Jr.	NPC	3	Majority
South Cotabato	2nd	Dinand Hernandez	PDP–Laban	2	Majority
Southern Leyte	Lone	Roger Mercado	PDP–Laban	1	Majority
Sultan Kudarat	1st	Suharto Mangudadatu	NUP (Note: Affiliated with Partido Tinig ng Masa at election.)	1	Majority
Sultan Kudarat	2nd	Horacio Suansing Jr.	PDP–Laban	1	Majority
Sulu	1st	Vacant (Note: Representative-elect Tupay Loong (NUP) died on June 30, 2016.)	—	—	—
Sulu	2nd	Abdulmunir Arbison	Nacionalista	1	Majority
Surigao del Norte	1st	Francisco Jose Matugas II	PDP–Laban	1	Minority
Surigao del Norte	2nd	Ace Barbers	Nacionalista	1	Majority
Surigao del Sur	1st	Prospero Pichay Jr.	Lakas	1	Majority
Surigao del Sur	2nd	Johnny Pimentel	PDP–Laban	1	Majority
Taguig–Pateros	1st	Arnel Cerafica	PDP–Laban	3	Majority
Taguig	2nd	Pia Cayetano	Nacionalista	1	Majority
Tarlac	1st	Charlie Cojuangco	NPC	1	Majority
Tarlac	2nd	Victor Yap	NPC	1	Majority
Tarlac	3rd	Noel Villanueva	NPC	2	Majority
Tawi-Tawi	Lone	Ruby Sahali	PDP–Laban	2	Majority
Valenzuela	1st	Wes Gatchalian	NPC	1	Majority
Valenzuela	2nd	Eric Martinez	PDP–Laban	1	Majority
Zambales	1st	Jeffrey Khonghun	Nacionalista	2	Majority
Zambales	2nd	Cheryl Deloso-Montalla	Liberal	2	Majority
Zamboanga City	1st	Celso Lobregat	PDP–Laban (Note: Affiliated with Laban ng Demokratikong Pilipino at election.)	2	Majority
Zamboanga City	2nd	Mannix Dalipe	NPC	1	Majority
Zamboanga del Norte	1st	Bullet Jalosjos	Nacionalista	3	Majority
Zamboanga del Norte	2nd	Glona Labadlabad	PDP–Laban	1	Majority
Zamboanga del Norte	3rd	Isagani Amatong	Liberal	2	Independent minority
Zamboanga del Sur	1st	Divina Grace Yu	PDP–Laban	1	Majority
Zamboanga del Sur	2nd	Aurora E. Cerilles	Nacionalista	3	Majority
Zamboanga Sibugay	1st	Wilter Palma II	PDP–Laban	1	Majority
Zamboanga Sibugay	2nd	Dulce Ann Hofer	PDP–Laban	2	Majority
Party-list		Salvador Belaro Jr.	1-Ang Edukasyon	1	Minority
Party-list		Carlos Roman Uybarreta	1-CARE	1	Majority
Party-list		Mikee Romero	1-PACMAN	1	Majority
Party-list		Enrico Pineda	1-PACMAN	1	Majority
Party-list		Rodante Marcoleta	1-SAGIP	1	Majority
Party-list		Julieta Cortuna	A TEACHER	3	Minority
Party-list		Sharon Garin	AAMBIS-Owa	3	Majority
Party-list		Neil Abayon	Aangat Tayo	1	Minority
Party-list		Teodoro Montoro	Aasenso	1	Majority
Party-list		Joseph Stephen Paduano	Abang Lingkod	2	Minority
Party-list		Conrado Estrella III	Abono	2	Majority
Party-list		Vini Nola Ortega	Abono	1	Majority
Party-list		Eugene Michael de Vera (Note: Eugene Michael de Vera was removed on November 19, 2018.)	ABS	1	Minority
Party-list		Ulysses Garces (Note: Ulysses Garces took office on December 3, 2018, to succeed Eugene Michael de Vera.)	ABS	0	Majority
Party-list		Antonio Tinio	ACT Teachers	3	Independent minority
Party-list		France Castro	ACT Teachers	1	Independent minority
Party-list		Aniceto Bertiz III	ACTS-OFW	1	Minority
Party-list		Rico Geron	AGAP	2	Majority
Party-list		Patricio Antonio	Agbiag	2	Majority
Party-list		Delphine Gan Lee	AGRI	2	Minority
Party-list		Orestes Salon	AGRI	1	Minority
Party-list		Tomasito Villarin	Akbayan	1	Independent minority
Party-list		Rodel Batocabe (Note: Rodel Batocabe was assassinated on December 22, 2018.)	Ako Bicol	3	Majority
Party-list		Alfredo Garbin	Ako Bicol	1	Minority
Party-list		Christopher Co	Ako Bicol	3	Majority
Party-list		Ronald Ang (Note: Ronald Ang took office on January 15, 2019, to succeed Rodel Batocabe.)	Ako Bicol	0	Minority
Party-list		Anna Suarez	ALONA	1	Minority
Party-list		Sitti Djalia Hataman (Note: Sitti Djalia Hataman resigned on October 1, 2017.)	AMIN	2	Majority
Party-list		Makmod Mending Jr.	AMIN	1	Majority
Party-list		Amihilda Sangcopan (Note: Amihilda Sangcopan took office on January 15, 2018, to succeed Sitti Djalia Hataman.)	AMIN	0	Independent minority
Party-list		Victoria Isabel Noel	An Waray	2	Majority
Party-list		Jose Panganiban Jr.	ANAC-IP	2	Majority
Party-list		Ariel Casilao	Anakpawis	1	Independent minority
Party-list		Dennis Laogan	Ang Kabuhayan	1	Majority
Party-list		Jesulito Manalo	Angkla	2	Majority
Party-list		Carlos Isagani Zarate	Bayan Muna	2	Independent minority
Party-list		Bernadette Herrera	BH	1	Majority
Party-list		Mike Velarde Jr.	Buhay	3	Majority
Party-list		Lito Atienza	Buhay	2	Minority
Party-list		Cecilia Leonila Chavez	Butil	1	Minority
Party-list		Sherwin Tugna	CIBAC	3	Majority
Party-list		Anthony Bravo	Coop-NATCCO	2	Minority
Party-list		Sabiniano Canama	Coop-NATCCO	1	Majority
Party-list		Emmeline Aglipay-Villar (Note: Emmeline Aglipay-Villar resigned on July 11, 2018, upon being appointed as an undersecretary in the Department of Justice.)	DIWA	3	Majority
Party-list		Pepito Pico (Note: Pepito Pico took office on November 14, 2018, to succeed Emmeline Aglipay-Villar.)	DIWA	0	Majority
Party-list		Emmi de Jesus	Gabriela	3	Independent minority
Party-list		Arlene Brosas	Gabriela	1	Independent minority
Party-list		Harry Roque (Note: Harry Roque resigned on October 30, 2017, upon being appointed as Presidential Spokesperson.)	Kabayan	1	Majority
Party-list		Ron Salo	Kabayan	1	Majority
Party-list		Ciriaco Calalang (Note: Ciriaco Calalang took office on January 20, 2018, to succeed Harry Roque. He later died on September 23, 2018.)	Kabayan	0	Minority
Party-list		Paul Hernandez (Note: Paul Hernandez took office on October 3, 2018, to succeed Ciriaco Calalang.)	Kabayan	0	Majority
Party-list		Sarah Elago	Kabataan	1	Independent minority
Party-list		Abigail Faye Ferriol-Pascual	Kalinga	3	Minority
Party-list		Shernee Tan	Kusug Tausug	1	Majority
Party-list		Arnel Ty	LPGMA	3	Majority
Party-list		Gary Alejano	Magdalo	2	Independent minority
Party-list		Virgilio Lacson	Manila Teachers	1	Majority
Party-list		Tricia Nicole Velasco-Catera	MATA	1	Majority
Party-list		Mark Aeron Sambar	PBA	1	Majority
Party-list		Jericho Nograles	PBA	1	Majority
Party-list		Ricardo Belmonte Jr.	SBP	1	Majority
Party-list		Francisco Datol Jr.	Senior Citizens	1	Majority
Party-list		Milagros Magsaysay	Senior Citizens	1	Majority
Party-list		Raymond Mendoza (Note: Raymond Mendoza took office on October 5, 2016.)	TUCP	0	Majority
Party-list		Benhur Lopez Jr.	YACAP	1	Minority

== Committees ==
=== Constitutional bodies ===
Committee	Senate				House of Representatives					
Committee	Chairman	Party	Minority leader	Party	Chairman	Party	District	Minority leader	Party	District
Commission on Appointments	Tito Sotto*	NPC	Francis Pangilinan	Liberal	Ronaldo Zamora	PDP–Laban	San Juan	Julieta Cortuna	A TEACHER	Party-list
Senate Electoral Tribunal	Grace Poe	Independent	Antonio Trillanes	Nacionalista	—N/a					
House of Representatives Electoral Tribunal	—N/a				Jorge Almonte	PDP–Laban	Misamis Oriental–1st	Abigail Faye Ferriol-Pascual	KALINGA	Party-list
Judicial and Bar Council	Dick Gordon	Independent	—N/a		Reynaldo Umali	Liberal	Oriental Mindoro–2nd	—N/a		

*Originally Koko Pimentel (PDP–Laban) from July 25, 2016, to May 21, 2018.

=== Senate committees ===
Committee	Party	Chair	Party	Minority leader	Number of members
Accountability of Public Officers and Investigations*	Independent	Richard Gordon	Nacionalista	Antonio Trillanes	17
Accounts	Independent	Panfilo Lacson	Nacionalista	Antonio Trillanes	11
Agrarian Reform	Nacionalista	Alan Peter Cayetano	Nacionalista	Antonio Trillanes	9
Agriculture and Food	Liberal	Kiko Pangilinan	Independent	Francis Escudero	11
Banks, Financial Institutions and Currencies	Independent	Francis Escudero	Nacionalista	Antonio Trillanes	9
Civil Service and Government Reorganization	Nacionalista	Antonio Trillanes IV	none		7
Climate Change	NPC	Loren Legarda	Independent	Francis Escudero	9
Constitutional Amendments, Revision of Codes and Laws	Liberal	Franklin Drilon	Independent	Francis Escudero	11
Cooperatives	Independent	Migz Zubiri	Independent	Francis Escudero	9
Cultural Communities	UNA	Nancy Binay	Nacionalista	Antonio Trillanes	7
Economic Affairs	NPC	Sherwin Gatchalian	Nacionalista	Antonio Trillanes	9
Education, Arts and Culture	Liberal	Bam Aquino	Independent	Francis Escudero	15
Electoral Reforms and People's Participation	Liberal	Leila de Lima	Independent	Francis Escudero	11
Energy	NPC	Sherwin Gatchalian	Nacionalista	Antonio Trillanes	15
Environment and Natural Resources	Nacionalista	Cynthia Villar	Nacionalista	Antonio Trillanes	15
Ethics and Privileges	NPC	Tito Sotto	Independent	Francis Escudero	7
Finance	NPC	Loren Legarda	Independent	Francis Escudero	17
Foreign Relations	Nacionalista	Alan Peter Cayetano	Independent	Francis Escudero	15
Games, Amusement and Sports	Independent	Panfilo Lacson	Independent	Francis Escudero	9
Government Corporations and Public Enterprises	Independent	Richard Gordon	Independent	Francis Escudero	9
Health and Demography	Akbayan	Risa Hontiveros	Nacionalista	Antonio Trillanes	11
Justice and Human Rights	Independent	Richard Gordon	Nacionalista	Antonio Trillanes	9
Labor, Employment and Human Resources Development	CIBAC	Joel Villanueva	Independent	Francis Escudero	13
Local Government	LDP	Sonny Angara	Independent	Francis Escudero	13
National Defense and Security	UNA	Gregorio Honasan	Independent	Francis Escudero	19
Peace, Unification and Reconciliation	UNA	Gregorio Honasan	Independent	Francis Escudero	7
Public Information and Mass Media	Independent	Grace Poe	Independent	Francis Escudero	9
Public Order and Dangerous Drugs	Independent	Panfilo Lacson	Nacionalista	Antonio Trillanes	9
Public Services	Independent	Grace Poe	Nacionalista	Antonio Trillanes	11
Public Works	PDP–Laban	Manny Pacquiao	Nacionalista	Antonio Trillanes	13
Rules	NPC	Tito Sotto	Independent	Francis Escudero	9
Science and Technology	Liberal	Bam Aquino	Nacionalista	Antonio Trillanes	7
Social Justice, Welfare and Rural Development	Nacionalista	Cynthia Villar	Nacionalista	Antonio Trillanes	7
Tourism	UNA	Nancy Binay	Independent	Francis Escudero	7
Trade, Commerce and Entrepreneurship	Independent	Migz Zubiri	Independent	Francis Escudero	9
Urban Planning, Housing and Resettlement	PDP–Laban	JV Ejercito	Independent	Francis Escudero	11
Ways and Means	LDP	Sonny Angara	Independent	Francis Escudero	15
Women, Family Relations and Gender Equality	Akbayan	Risa Hontiveros	Nacionalista	Antonio Trillanes	9
Youth	CIBAC	Joel Villanueva	Nacionalista	Antonio Trillanes	7

*more popularly known as the Blue Ribbon Committee.

=== House of Representatives committees ===
Committee	Party	Chair	Party	Minority leader	Number of members
Accounts	Nacionalista	Eileen Ermita-Buhain	Nacionalista	Richard Eusebio	105
Agrarian Reform	Liberal	Rene Relampagos	Butil	Cecilia Leonila Chavez	40
Agriculture and Food	ANAC-IP	Jose Panganiban Jr.	Butil	Cecilia Leonila Chavez	65
Appropriations	NUP	Karlo Nograles	Agri	Orestes Salon	125
Aquaculture and Fisheries Resources	NUP	Luis Ferrer IV	Butil	Cecilia Leonila Chavez	55
Banks and Financial Intermediaries	Nacionalista	Ben Evardone	Agri	Orestes Salon	45
Basic Education and Culture	none		A TEACHER	Julieta Cortuna	65
Civil Service and Professional Regulation	none		Nacionalista	Richard Eusebio	35
Constitutional Amendments	Liberal	Roger Mercado	Aangat Tayo	Harlin Neil Abayon III	35
Cooperatives Development	AGAP	Rico Geron	ALONA	Anna Marie Villaraza-Suarez	25
Dangerous Drugs	Nacionalista	Robert "Ace" Barbers	Butil	Cecilia Leonila Chavez	45
Ecology	PDP–Laban	Estrelita Suansing	Liberal	Arlene B. Arcillas	35
Economic Affairs	NPC	Arthur Yap	Agri	Orestes Salon	35
Energy	PDP–Laban	Lord Allan Jay Velasco	Agri	Orestes Salon	65
Ethics and Privileges	Agri	Delphine Lee	none		25
Foreign Affairs	Liberal	Linabelle Ruth Villarica	ACTS-OFW	Aniceto Bertiz	55
Games and Amusements	PDP–Laban	Gustavo Tambuting	UNA	Monsour del Rosario	65
Good Government and Public Accountability	PDP–Laban	Johnny Pimentel	Agri	Orestes Salon	45
Government Enterprises and Privatization	PDP–Laban	Jesus Sacdalan	Nacionalista	Richard Eusebio	35
Government Reorganization	Liberal	Henedina Abad	ACTS-OFW	Aniceto Bertiz	25
Health	NPC	Angelina Tan	Butil	Cecilia Leonila Chavez	65
Higher and Technical Education	Liberal	Dulce Ann Hofer	A TEACHER	Julieta Cortuna	65
Housing and Urban Development	PDP–Laban	Alfredo Benitez	ACTS-OFW	Aniceto Bertiz	55
Human Rights	Liberal	Cherry Deloso-Montalla	A TEACHER	Julieta Cortuna	35
Indigenous Cultural Communities And Indigenous Peoples	Liberal	Nancy Catamco	Liberal	Arlene B. Arcillas	25
Information and Communications Technology	NPC	Victor Yap	A TEACHER	Julieta Cortuna	55
Interparliamentary Relations and Diplomacy	PDP–Laban	Rosemarie Arenas	ALONA	Anna Marie Villaraza-Suarez	45
Justice	PDP–Laban	Reynaldo V. Umali	Kalinga	Abigail Faye Ferriol-Pascual	55
Labor and Employment	NUP	Randolph Ting	ACTS-OFW	Aniceto Bertiz	40
Legislative Franchises	PDP–Laban	Franz Alvarez	ACTS-OFW	Aniceto Bertiz	45
Local Government	NPC	Pedro Acharon Jr.	Liberal	Arlene B. Arcillas	55
Metro Manila Development	Liberal	Winston Castelo	Nacionalista	Richard Eusebio	30
Mindanao Affairs	CDP	Maximo Rodriguez. Jr	ACTS-OFW	Aniceto Bertiz	60
Muslim Affairs	none		ACTS-OFW	Aniceto Bertiz	20
National Defense and Security	Aksyon	Amado Espino Jr.	UNA	Monsour del Rosario	65
Natural Resources	none		Agri	Orestes Salon	65
Overseas Workers Affairs	none		ACTS-OFW	Aniceto Bertiz	35
People's Participation	none		ALONA	Anna Marie Villaraza-Suarez	25
Population and Family Relations	UNA	Sol Aragones	Butil	Cecilia Leonila Chavez	25
Poverty Alleviation	none		Kalinga	Abigail Faye Ferriol-Pascual	25
Public Information	none		Kalinga	Abigail Faye Ferriol-Pascual	35
Public Order and Safety	Liberal	Romeo Acop	Nacionalista	Richard Eusebio	55
Public Works and Highways	PDP–Laban	Celso Lobregat	Nacionalista	Richard Eusebio	95
Revision of Laws	NPC	Marlyn Primicias-Agabas	Kalinga	Abigail Faye Ferriol-Pascual	25
Rules	Nacionalista	Rodolfo Fariñas	Aangat Tayo	Harlin Neil Abayon III	30
Rural Development	PDP–Laban	Deogracias Ramos	Agri	Orestes Salon	25
Science and Technology	NPC	Erico Aristotle Aumentado	Butil	Cecilia Leonila Chavez	35
Small Business and Entrepreneurship Development	PDP–Laban	Peter Unabia	ALONA	Anna Marie Villaraza-Suarez	25
Social Services	Liberal	Frederick Abueg	ALONA	Anna Marie Villaraza-Suarez	35
Suffrage And Electoral Reforms	CIBAC	Sherwin Tugna	Kalinga	Abigail Faye Ferriol-Pascual	35
Tourism	PDP–Laban	Lucy Torres	A TEACHER	Julieta Cortuna	55
Trade and Industry	NUP	Ferjenel G. Biron	Liberal	Arlene B. Arcillas	55
Transportation	Liberal	Cesar Sarmiento	Nacionalista	Richard Eusebio	85
Veterans Affairs and Welfare	Liberal	Leopoldo Bataoil	Butil	Cecilia Leonila Chavez	30
Ways and Means	Liberal	Dakila Carlo Cua	Agri	Orestes Salon	75
Welfare of Children	NPC	Aurora Cerilles	ALONA	Anna Marie Villaraza-Suarez	20
Women and Gender Equality	none		Kalinga	Abigail Faye Ferriol-Pascual	55
Youth and Sports Development	Abono	Conrado Estrella III	PDP–Laban	Monsour del Rosario	35

== Changes in membership ==
=== Senate ===
Vacating member				Special election	Successor		
Member	Party	Date	Reason	Special election	Name	Party	Date
Alan Peter Cayetano	Nacionalista	May 17, 2017	Appointment as Secretary of Foreign Affairs	None; seat to be filled in the 2019 election.			

=== House of Representatives ===
==== District Representatives ====
District	Vacating member				Special election	Successor		
District	Member	Party	Date	Reason	Special election	Member	Party	Date
Sulu–1st	Tupay Loong	NUP	June 30, 2016	Death due to liver cancer	No special elections were done, and no replacements were elected.			
Las Piñas	Mark Villar	Nacionalista	August 1, 2016	Appointed as Secretary of Public Works and Highways	No special elections were done, and no replacements were elected.			
Basilan	Jum Jainudin Akbar	Liberal	November 11, 2016	Death due to cardiac arrest	No special elections were done, and no replacements were elected.			
Mountain Province	Maximo Dalog	Liberal	June 3, 2017	Death due to kidney failure	No special elections were done, and no replacements were elected.			
Batanes	Henedina Abad	Liberal	October 8, 2017	Death due to cancer	No special elections were done, and no replacements were elected.			

==== Party-list Representatives ====
Member	Party	Date	Reason	Successor	Took office
Sitti Djalia Turabin Hataman	Anak Mindanao	October 2, 2017	Resigned to return to private life	Amihilda Sangcopan	January 15, 2018
Harry Roque	Kabayan	October 30, 2017	Appointed as Presidential Spokesperson	Ciriaco Calalang	January 15, 2018
Emmeline Aglipay-Villar	DIWA	July 11, 2018	Appointed as Justice Undersecretary	Pepito Pico	November 14, 2018
Ciriaco Calalang	Kabayan	September 23, 2018	Death due to stroke	Paul Hernandez	October 3, 2018
Eugene De Vera	ABS Partylist	November 19, 2018	Dropped from the rolls	Ullyses Garces	December 3, 2018
Rodel Batocabe	Ako Bicol	December 22, 2018	Died in an ambush	Ronald Ang	January 15, 2019

== Laws passed ==
The 17th Congress passed a total of 379 bills which were signed into law by President Rodrigo Duterte. 120 of these laws were national in scope, while 259 were local. Some of these laws include:

- Republic Act 10923: Postponing of the Philippine barangay and Sangguniang Kabataan elections, 2016
- Republic Act 10931: Universal Access to Quality Tertiary Education Act
- Republic Act 10952: Postponing of the Philippine barangay and Sangguniang Kabataan elections, 2016
- Republic Act 10962: Gift Check Act of 2017
- Republic Act 10966: Making December 8 as a nonworking holiday commemorating the feast of the Immaculate Conception
- Republic Act 11014: The First Philippine Republic Day Act
- Republic Act 11053: Anti-Hazing Act of 2018
- Republic Act 11054: Bangsamoro Organic Law
- Republic Act 11055: Philippine Identification System Act
- Republic Act 11058: Occupational Safety and Health Standards Law
