= Calalang =

Calalang is a surname of Philippine origin. Notable people with the surname include:

- Alfonso Calalang, Filipino banker
- Ciriaco Calalang (1951–2018), Filipino academic and politician
- Jessica Calalang (born 1995), American pair skater
