= Arellano University Institute of Allied Medical Services =

- Address: Arellano University – Juan Sumulong Campus, Manila, Philippines
- Website: www.arellano.edu.ph

The Arellano University Institute of Allied Medical Services is the school of the university that specializes in physical therapy. It offers the courses of Bachelor of Science in Physical Therapy and Bachelor of Science in Medical Technology/ Medical Laboratory Science. To date, the Medical Technology course was separated into its own program.
