= Neil Abayon =

Filipino lawyer and politician

Member of the Philippine House of Representatives for Aangat Tayo
- In office June 30, 2016 – June 30, 2019
- Preceded by: Daryl Grace Abayon

Personal details
- Born: Harlin Neil Jagdon Abayon III; July 29, 1988 (age 38)
- Party: Nacionalista (since 2021)
- Other political affiliations: Aangat Tayo (electoral party; 2015–2019)
- Spouse: Milliscent Ann M. Abayon
- Children: 1
- Education: Adventist University of the Philippines; Arellano University School of Law
- Profession: Lawyer, businessman, politician, nurse

Harlin Neil Jagdon Abayon III (born July 29, 1988) is a Filipino lawyer, businessman, nurse and politician who is currently serving as the spokesperson for Mans Carpio, husband of Vice President Sara Duterte. He previously served as representative for the Aangat Tayo party-list from 2016 to 2019.

== Early life and education ==
Harlin Neil Abayon was born on July 29, 1988 to Harlin Castillo Abayon, a politician and lawyer who served as governor of Northern Samar from 1988 to 1998 and later as its first district representative, and Daryl Grace Jagdon Abayon, a nurse and politician.

Abayon attended the Adventist University of the Philippines in Silang, Cavite, and in 2008, Abayon passed the Nurse Licensure Examination. He later attended the Arellano University School of Law, and by 2023, he passed the Philippine Bar Examination after three attempts.

== Career ==
=== Political career ===
Abayon won as party-list representative for Aangat Tayo (lit. 'We will rise'), which sought to represent multiple sectors such as the youth and the poor, in the 2016 election. Abayon succeeded his mother Daryl Grace, whose term ended in 2013. He served for one term, and lost reelection in 2019. As congressman, Abayon served as a deputy minority leader and a member of the Congressional Oversight Committee on the Official Development Assistance (COCODA).

Abayon was the primary author of a house bill renewing the broadcast license of Gateway U.H.F. Television Broadcasting Inc., owner of Hope Channel Philippines and an affiliate of the Seventh-day Adventist Church, for an additional 25 years, which was signed into law as Republic Act No. 11004 by President Rodrigo Duterte in March 2018. Later, Abayon called for the reversal of unannounced fare hikes on jeepneys and buses by the Land Transportation Franchising and Regulatory Board (LTFRB) in late 2018. Towards the end of his term, he also called for the increased safety of children online amidst concerns with the viral Momo Challenge, pushing to amend both the Cybercrime Law and Anti-Bullying Law in order to prohibit "suicide games" and online bullying due to them being "threats" and convening experts on the issue to form a consultative group.

In 2022, Abayon ran for vice mayor of San Antonio, Northern Samar under the Nacionalista Party, but lost to incumbent Rudy S. Baguioso.

=== Legal career ===
Abayon served as counsel to Denmark Valmores, a student of Mindanao State University - College of Medicine who filed a case against Dean Cristina Achacoso and one other faculty member before the Supreme Court in 2014 for failing to recognize his religious rights; in 2017, the Supreme Court ruled in favor of Valmores.

Abayon is currently a partner at the ACCA law firm based in Ortigas Center, Pasig since late 2023, primarily dealing with litigation cases. In late April 2026, Abayon was hired by lawyer Mans Carpio, the husband of Vice President Sara Duterte, to be his spokesperson amidst questions raised by the Anti–Money Laundering Council on the suspicious transactions that occurred through Carpio's shared bank account with Duterte.

== Personal life ==
Abayon is married to Milliscent Ann M. Abayon, and they have one son. Milliscent Ann ran alongside her husband as the fourth nominee of Aangat Tayo in the 2019 party-list election.

Abayon is a Seventh-day Adventist.
