= Gunma University of Health and Welfare =

Private university in Maebashi, Gunma, Japan

Coordinates: 36.355965°N 139.047423°E

- 群馬医療福祉大学
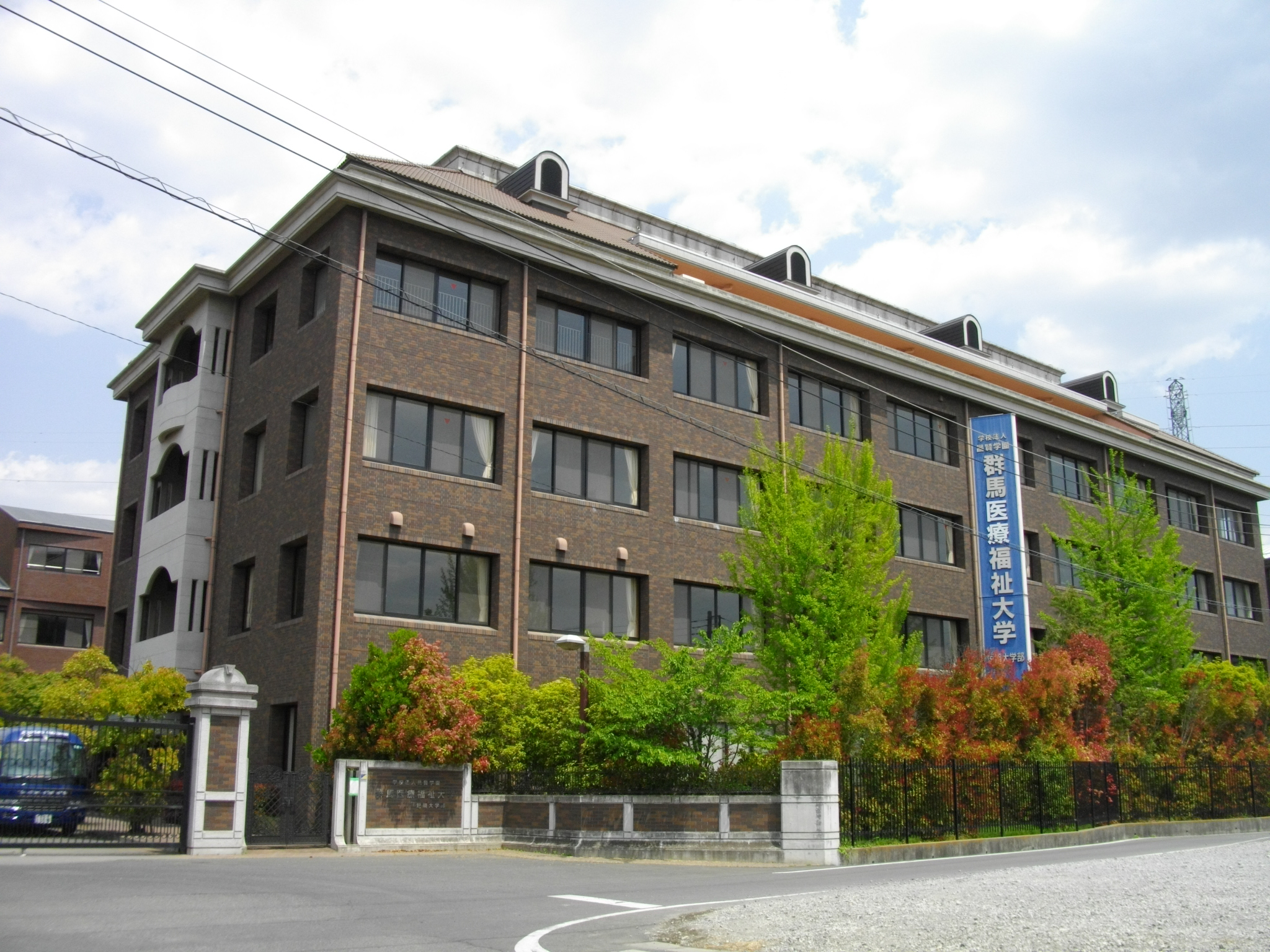
- Type: Private
- Established: 1449; 577 years ago chartered 2002
- Location: Maebashi, Gunma, Japan
- Website: Official home page

Gunma University of Health and Welfare (群馬医療福祉大学, Gunma Iryō Fukushi Daigaku) is a private university in Maebashi, Gunma, Japan. The school was established in 2002 as the Gunma University of Social Welfare (群馬社会福祉大学, Gunma shakai fukushi daigaku) and was renamed to its present name in 2010. The predecessor of the school was founded in 1449.(in Japanese) The school has a secondary campus located in Fujioka, Gunma

== Academics and research ==
- Faculty of Social Welfare / Department of Social Welfare
  - Social Welfare Course
  - Welfare Psychology Course
  - School Education Course
  - Child Welfare Course
  - Elementary Education Course

Faculty / Department founding
Faculty / Department	Year founded
Faculty of Social Welfare / Department of Social Welfare	2002
Faculty of Nursing / Department of Nursing	2010
Faculty of Rehabilitation / Department of Rehabilitation	2012
Junior College / Department of Nursing Care	1996
Graduate School of Social Welfare	2007

- Faculty of Nursing / Department of Nursing
- Faculty of Rehabilitation / Department of Rehabilitation
  - Physical Therapy Course
  - Occupational Therapy Course
- Junior College / (two-year course) Department of Nursing Care
  - Nursing Care Welfare Course
  - Care Worker Practice Course
  - Medical Office Work & Secretary Course
  - Welfare General Course
- Graduate School of Social Welfare / Course of Social Welfare Management

== Domestic exchange ==
- Maebashi Institute of Technology

== International exchanges ==
- University of Regina
- King's University College (University of Western Ontario)
- Arellano University
- Beijing Social Administration Vocational College
- University of Thanhdong Vietnam
