= Kabalikat ng Mamamayan =

Political party in the Philippines

Kabayan
- — Philippine partylist —
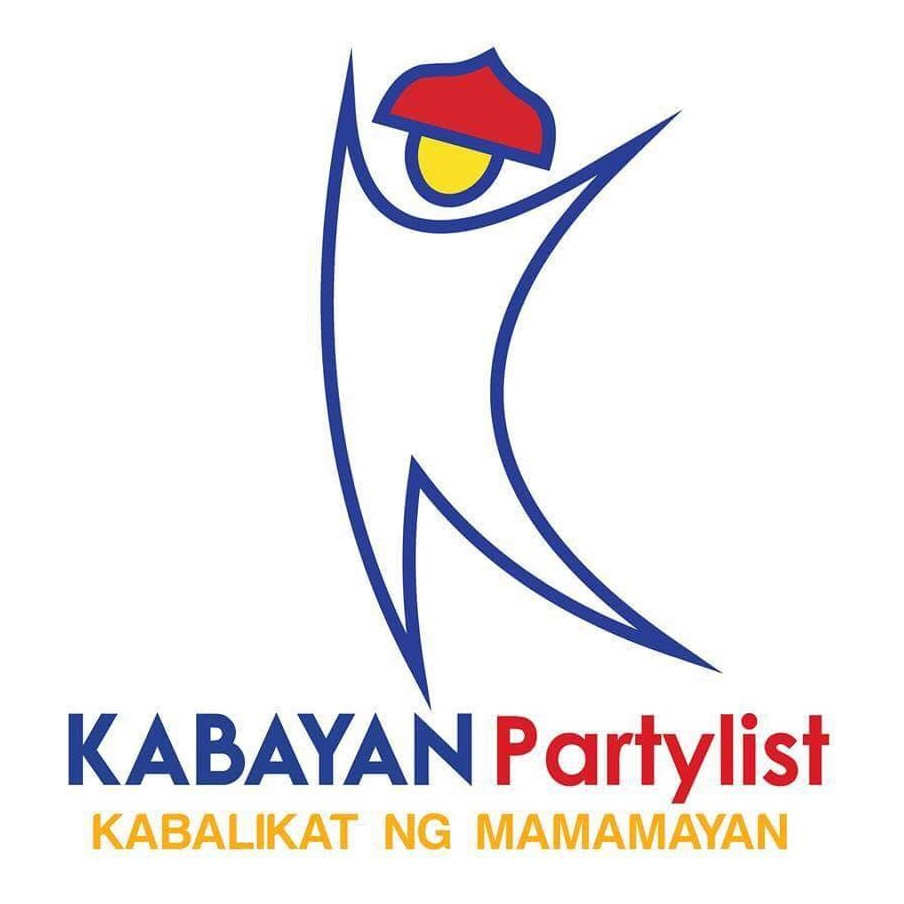
- Full name: Kabalikat ng Mamamayan
- Sector(s) represented: Multi-sector
- Founder: Ron Salo
- COMELEC accreditation: 2009; 17 years ago

Kabayan Partylist, an abbreviation of Kabalikat ng Mamamayan (lit. 'Citizen's Shoulder'), is a political organization which has party-list representation in the House of Representatives of the Philippines. The party-list that represents marginalized sectors of the Filipino community, including disabled people, senior citizens, overseas Filipino workers (OFWs), fishermen, farmers, and the poor.

Kabayan was founded by Ron Salo in 2009.

== History ==
Kabayan was registered as a party-list group with the Commission on Elections in 2009.

=== 15th Congress ===
KABAYAN party list lost in the 2010 elections after it only got 110,085 votes or 0.38%. It was Kabayan's first attempt to seek a congressional seat.

=== 17th Congress ===
KABAYAN finished sixth out of a total 115 party-list groups that ran. It secured two seats for the partylist in the House of Representatives.

=== 18th Congress ===
During the 18th Congress, Kabayan had four representatives that filled the two seats it won.

KABAYAN's founder Ron Salo filled in the first seat. Harry Roque was the second nominee.

However Roque would be expelled from Kabayan in January 2017 citing his "dishonorable behavior" during the House of Representatives inquiry in November 2016 regarding activities involving the illegal drug trade in the New Bilibid Prison where Roque and other legislators were criticized for inappropriate line of questioning towards Ronnie Dayan, the former lover of then Senator Leila de Lima and alleged bagman. Roque would challenge his removal from the partylist through the Commission on Elections.

Roque was appointed the spokesperson of President Rodrigo Duterte rendering his cases in the COMELEC for ouster moot and academic. Roque's successor Ciriaco Calalang died in office on September 23, 2018, and was replaced by Paul Hernandez.

=== 19th congress ===
Dr. Richard Mata, a pediatrician and content creator was picked by the partylist to be one of their nominees. But due to not gaining of 2% threshold vote, only Ron Salo is able to get a seat.

=== 20th Congress ===
KABAYAN partylist supported Mata's Senate bid in 2025, even though Mata is running as independent.

== Political positions ==
Kabayan's declared platform of core advocacies are surmised in the acronym "KABAYAN+2" with the marginalized as their named primary target demographic. The three syllables of "KABAYAN" represents kalusugan, pabahay, and kabuhayan ('health', 'housing', and 'livelihood respectively). Right to education and Overseas Filipino Workers' interests are represented in the "+2" portion of the acronym.

They advocate for right to health and legislation for universal health insurance coverage. They also aimed for a legislation which would create a Department of Housing and seek to promote capability-building in cooperativism and micro-financing for micro, small and medium enterprises.

== Electoral history ==
Election	Votes	%	Seats
2010	110,085	0.37	1
2013	Did not participate		
2016	840,393	2.60	2
2019	198,571	0.71	1
2022	280,066	0.76	1
2025	141,847	0.34	0

== Representatives to Congress ==
Period	1st Representative	2nd Representative
17th Congress; 2016–2019	Ron Salo	Harry Roque Jr. (2016–2017; expelled/resigned)
17th Congress; 2016–2019	Ron Salo	Ciriaco Calalang (2016–2017; died in office)
17th Congress; 2016–2019	Ron Salo	Paul Hernandez (2018–2019)
18th Congress; 2019–2022	Ron Salo	—N/a
19th Congress; 2022–2025	Ron Salo	—N/a
Note: A party-list group, can win a maximum of three seats in the House of Representatives.
