= Arellano University =

Private university in Metro Manila, Philippines

- Pamantasang Arellano (Filipino)
- Former names: Arellano Law College (1938–1941); Arellano Colleges (1945–1947)
- Motto: For God and Country
- Type: Private, Non-sectarian, Basic and Higher education institution
- Established: February 27, 1938; 88 years ago
- Founder: Florentino Cayco Sr.
- Academic affiliations: Connect Asia Pacific; International Nursing Program; LAWPHiL Project; Philippine Association of Law Schools; Philippine Association of Colleges & Universities
- Chairman: Francisco Paulino Cayco
- President: Francisco Paulino Cayco
- Vice-president: Florentino Cayco III (Administration); Alma Curato (Finance); Valente Cayco (Marketing); Maria Theresa Rivera (Academic Affairs); Frederick Dedace (Human Resources); Mario F. Sales (International Programs)
- Students: 30,000+ (2015)
- Location: 2600 Legarda St., Sampaloc, Manila, Philippines; 14°36′00.62″N 120°59′46.64″E
- Campus: 7 Urban campuses (secondary campuses in Pasay, Pasig, Malabon, Manila and Mandaluyong)
- Alma Mater song: Arellano Hymn
- Colors: Blue and red
- Nickname: Chiefs
- Sporting affiliations: NCAA; NCC Philippines
- Mascot: Indian Chief
- Website: www.arellano.edu.ph
- Location in Metro Manila Location in Luzon Location in the Philippines

Arellano University (AU) is a private, nonsectarian university located in the City of Manila, the capital of the Philippines. It was founded in 1938 as a law school by Florentino Cayco Sr., the first Filipino Undersecretary of Public Instruction. The university was named after Cayetano Arellano, the first Chief Justice of the Supreme Court of the Philippines. It operates seven campuses located throughout Metro Manila and the main campus is located along Legarda Street, Sampaloc, Manila. The Arellano University School of Law is autonomous and managed by the Arellano Law Foundation. Its athletic team, the Arellano University Chiefs, is a member of the National Collegiate Athletic Association since 2009.

== History ==
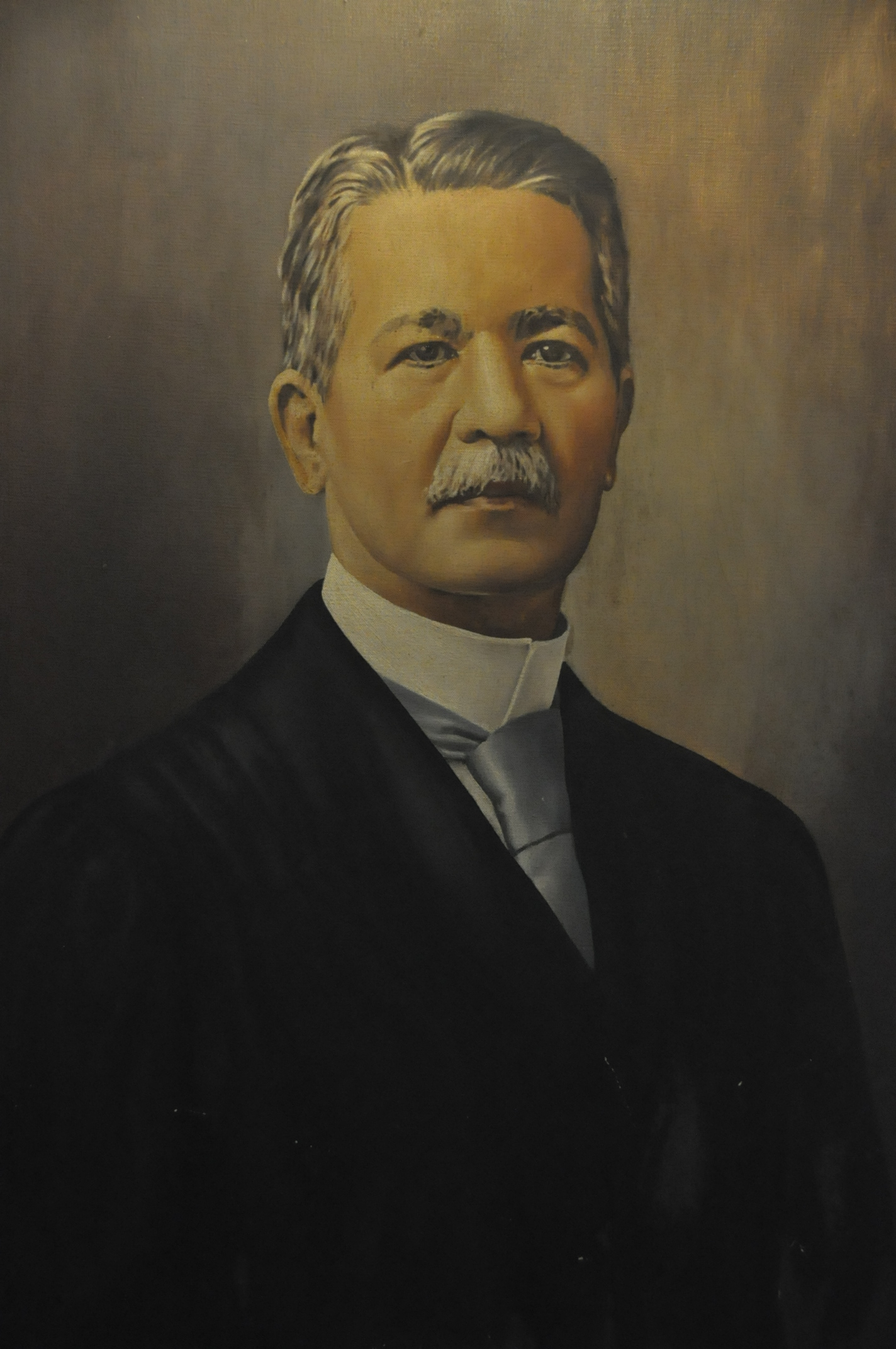
Cayetano Arellano, the first Chief Justice of the Philippine Supreme Court, after whom the university was named.

Arellano University began in 1938 by Florentino Cayco Sr. It was established as a law school by Cayco, the first Filipino Undersecretary of Public Instruction and an educator. The school was named Arellano Law College, which is derived from Cayetano Arellano, the first Filipino Supreme Court Chief Justice. The newly founded institution offers the regular four-year law course and was one of the well-known institutions at that time catering to numerous prolific people in the field of law and public service.

On the onset of World War II, the school was closed from 1941 to 1945. It was reopened in April 1945 and renamed as the Arellano Colleges. It has expanded course offerings in commerce, foreign service, and arts and sciences. In 1946, Florentino Cayco Sr. became the school's first president, and through his efforts, the institution was granted university status on February 22, 1947, by the Department of Education, Culture, and Sports and was accordingly renamed as Arellano University. AU continued its robust expansion with the offering of new courses, which resulted into the addition of new colleges.

In 1948, from its present site in Legarda at Sampaloc, AU moved to a new site in Plaza Guipit. It was relocated back to its old site in Legarda when a new modern four-storey concrete building was erected in 1955. In 1954, AU opened an institute of nursing and a law school. The Arellano University School of Law would later be managed by the Arellano Law Foundation under a Memorandum of Agreement in 1978. Arellano Law Foundation is a non-stock and non-profit organization established by the alumni, faculty members, and employees of AU whose objective was to establish and operate a law school. The School of Law was successfully turned over to Arellano Law Foundation on April 22, 1979, but remained as one of the constituent colleges of the university.

In 2015, AU entered into a partnership with Ayala Education to launch the LINC@Arellano, a junior college program that serves as an early implementation of the Philippines' K-12 program. Later on, the university began to fully integrate the K-12 program with the offering of Senior High School (SHS) strands.

== Campuses and locations ==
Arellano University operates seven campuses throughout Metro Manila.

| Image | Campus | Location | Founded | Campus land area | Note |
|---|---|---|---|---|---|
| | Juan Sumulong Campus | Manila | 1946 | 1.4 hectares | Main campus of Arellano University |
| | Apolinario Mabini Campus | Menlo, Pasay | 1938 | 0.96 hectares | Campus of Arellano University School of Law, original campus of the former American School of Manila (original name of International School Manila) prior to its handover |
| | Andres Bonifacio Campus | Pasig | 1946 | 1.29 hectares | |
| | José Abad Santos Campus | Pasay | 1945 | 0.67 hectares | Another campus in Pasay located at Taft Avenue corner Gil Puyat Avenue, considered as one of the first campuses built |
| | Jose Rizal Campus | Malabon | 1950 | 0.56 hectares | An extension of the Elisa Esguerra Campus, it was formerly known as Gregorio Sancianco High School Campus. The campus was closed down in the 1980s and AU developed a new campus called Elisa Esguerra Campus a few city blocks south. Redeveloped by the university in 2017, it was renamed as Jose Rizal Campus. |
| | Elisa Esguerra Campus | Malabon | 2017 | 0.40 hectares | |
| | Plaridel Campus | Mandaluyong | 1950 | 0.37 hectares | |
| | F.G. Calderon Campus | Manila | | | This campus was closed in the 1960s. All of its documents were transferred to the Plaridel Campus. |

=== Juan Sumulong Campus (AU Main/Legarda) ===
AU Manila is the Main Campus of Arellano University. It is located at Legarda Street in Sampaloc, Manila and it the largest campus by land area. It is the home to the AU Juan Sumulong High School.

=== Jose Abad Santos Campus (AU Pasay) ===
The campus of AU in Pasay is officially known as Arellano University – José Abad Santos Campus (AUJASC). It is located along Taft Avenue in Pasay near the LRT-1 Gil Puyat Station. It was established in 1945 as the José Abad Santos High School. The campus was named after José Abad Santos y Basco, the fifth Chief Justice of the Supreme Court of the Philippines who also served as the acting President of the Philippines during World War II until executed by the Japanese invading forces. In 1986, the Colleges of the nearby Apolinario Mabini Campus transferred to this campus, with the exception of the School of Law.

=== Manila ===
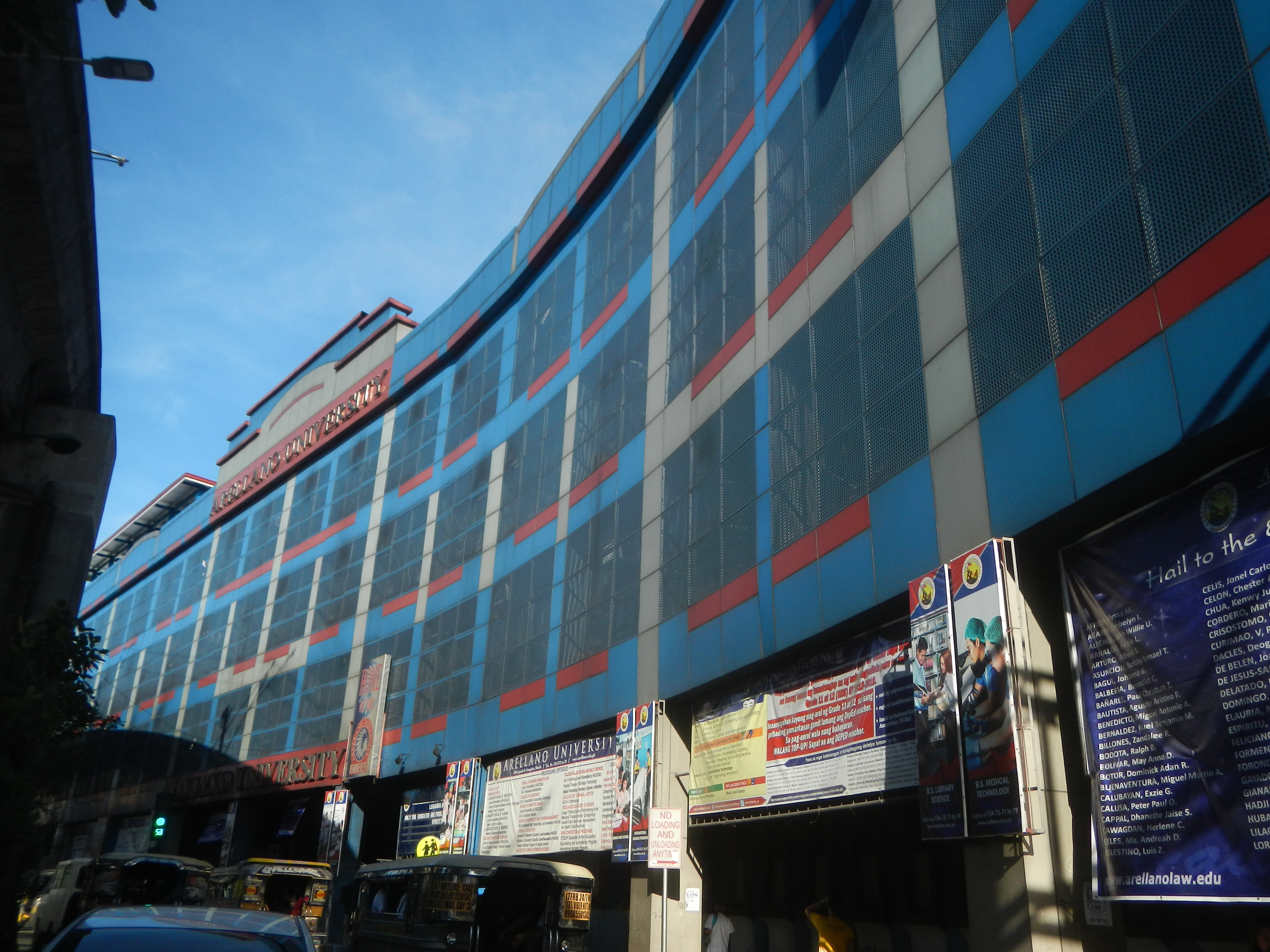
AU Legarda is the university's Main Campus

AU Manila is the Main Campus of Arellano University. It is located at Legarda Street in Sampaloc, Manila and it is the largest campus by land area. It is the home to the AU Juan Sumulong High School.

=== Pasig ===
AU in Pasig was officially known as Arellano University – Andres Bonifacio Campus (AU-ABC) and the campus was named after Andrés Bonifacio y de Castro, a Filipino nationalist and revolutionary. It is located in Caniogan, Pasig.

=== Taft Avenue, Pasay ===
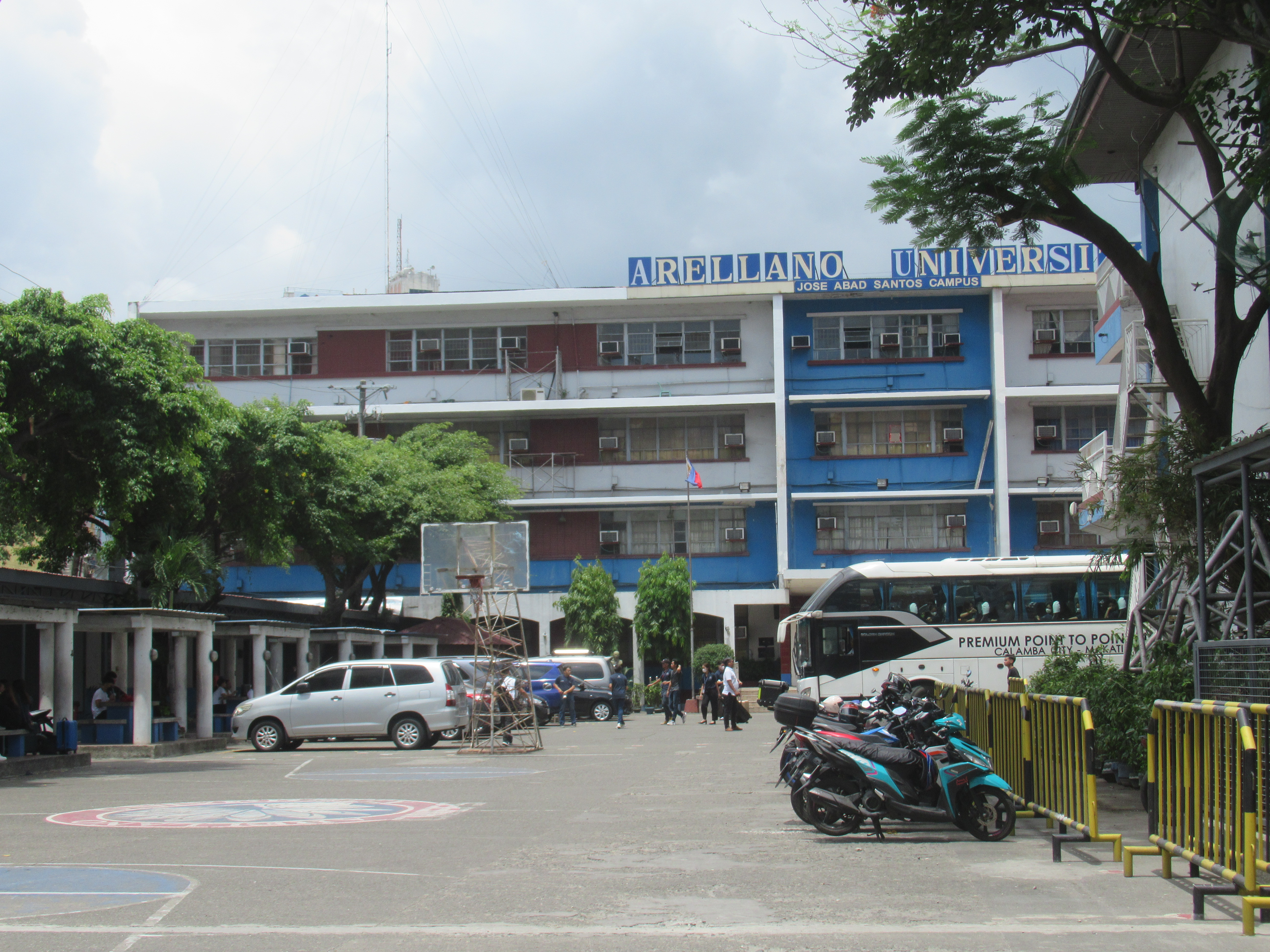
AU Jose Abad Santos, another campus in Pasay, is one of the university's first campus to be built.

The campus of AU in Pasay is officially known as Arellano University – José Abad Santos Campus (AUJAS). It is located along Taft Avenue in Pasay near the LRT-1 Gil Puyat Station. It was established in 1945 as the José Abad Santos High School. The campus was named after José Abad Santos y Basco, the fifth Chief Justice of the Supreme Court of the Philippines who also served as the acting President of the Philippines during World War II until executed by the Japanese invading forces. In 1986, the Colleges of the nearby Apolinario Mabini Campus transferred to this campus, with the exception of the School of Law. This is the only campus located in Pasay City that offers complete level-from pre-school to college.

=== Menlo, Pasay ===
The campus of AU located along Taft Avenue corner Menlo Street, Pasay is the campus of the School of Law. Formerly, it has other colleges that were transferred to the nearby Abad Santos Campus. Aside from the School of Law, the campus has a Junior and Senior High School. The campus was named after Apolinario Mabini, the sublime paralytic.

=== Malabon ===
AU in Malabon is composed of two campuses, the Elisa Esguerra Campus and the Jose Rizal Campus. Jose Rizal is located along Gov. Pascual Avenue, while the Elisa Esguerra Campus is located in Bayan-Bayanan a couple of city blocks further north of Jose Rizal Campus. It is composed of a Preschool, Elementary School, Junior and Senior High School, the School of Business and Commerce, School of Education, School of Hospitality and Tourism Management and the Institute of Arts and Sciences. Notable people from AU Malabon include Norberto B. Gonzales, who served as the 34th Secretary of the Department of National Defense, Dionisio Santiago, former head of the Philippine Drug Enforcement Agency and the Dangerous Drug Board, Cheryl Oliveros, a candidate of Bb. Pilipinas 2009, and Bayani Agbayani, an actor and comedian.

=== Mandaluyong ===
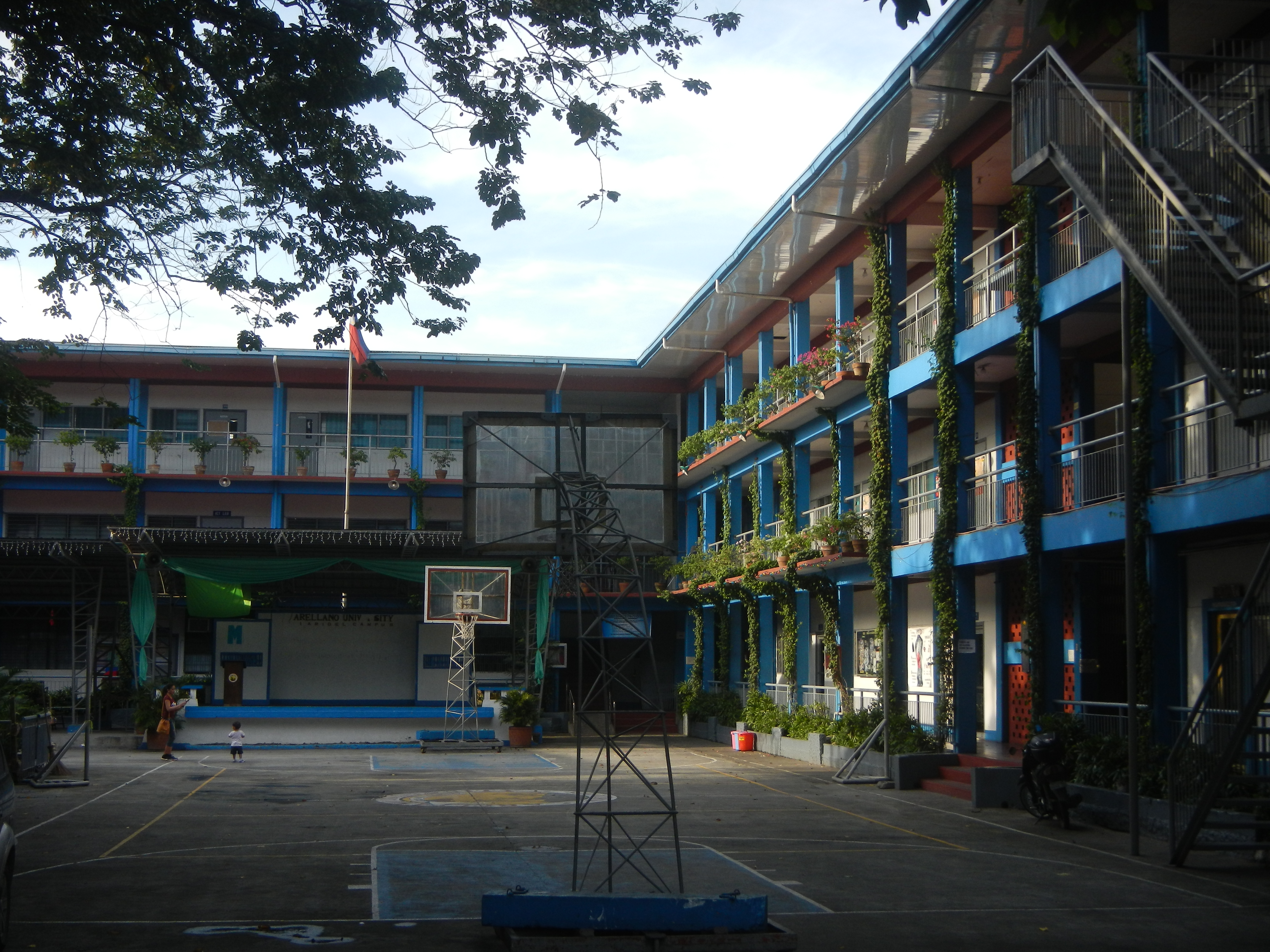
Arellano University in Mandaluyong

AU established a campus in Mandaluyong on 1950, upon the request of high school students studying in AU Manila but are residents of Mandaluyong. The campus was officially known as Arellano University – Plaridel Campus (AUPC). It is located at 53 General Kalentong Street in Barangay Pag-asa. The campus was named after the pen-name of Marcelo H. del Pilar, a leading propagandist of the Philippine Revolution. AUPC has a Preschool, Elementary School, Junior and Senior High School and is composed of the College of Arts and Sciences, College of Criminology, School of Education, School of Hospital and Tourism Management, and the School of Computer Science.

=== Defunct campus ===
==== F.G. Calderon Campus ====
Located in Santa Ana, Manila, all records of F.G. Calderon Campus were transferred to Plaridel Campus when it was closed in the late 1960s. At present, high-rise residential towers occupies the site.

== Administration and organization ==
Arellano is governed by its CEO, a board of trustees, and the corporate officers. The CEO manages the overall operational performance of AU. All campuses of Arellano are under the CEO's direct control and supervision.

== Academics and research ==
College/school founding
| College/school | Year founded |
| School of Law | 1938 |
| College of Arts and Sciences | 1945 |
| College of Education | 1945 |
| College of Business and Technology | 1945 |
| Allied Medical Services | 1954 |
| Florentino Cayco Memorial; School of Graduate Studies | 1978 |

Arellano University is formed by five academic clusters that cater to undergraduates and postgraduates. Two clusters, the Allied Medical Services and the College of Business and Technology, are formed by one or more colleges, schools, or an institute. Arellano also has its own elementary and high schools. All academic programs are offered across its six campuses.

The Florentino Cayco Memorial School of Graduate Studies on Education is the graduate school of AU. It was named after the founder of the university and offers education-related advanced academic degrees.

The Arellano University School of Law (AUSL), established in 1938, is the law school of AU and is managed by the Arellano Law Foundation, a nonstock and nonprofit corporation established by alumni of the university. It is one of the oldest law schools in the Philippines and rose to prominence by producing successful graduates who mold the political history of the country.

The College of Arts and Sciences is the liberal arts school of AU.

The College of Education is the normal school of the university. AU's two elementary schools (Manila and Pasig campuses) and secondary schools (Manila, Pasig, Pasay, and Malabon campuses) serve as the college's laboratory school. Education students of AU are exposed to international education through its partnership with Hailida International Kindergarten School in Shenzhen, China.

The College of Nursing' leads to the degree of bachelor of science in nursing with an option to finish to complete and earn degree from Edith Cowan University in Perth, Australia.

The College of Allied Medical Services comprises five colleges and one diploma program - the College of Physical Therapy, College of Nursing, College of Radiologic Technology, College of Medical Laboratory Science/Medical Technology, College of Pharmacy, and the diploma program in midwifery.

The College of Business and Technology is a cluster college formed by the Institute of Accountancy, School of Computer Science, School of Business and Administration, and School of Hospitality and Tourism Management.

The College of Criminal Justice Education offers a four-year course leading to a degree of bachelor of science in criminology.

=== Research ===
The Research and Publications Department is the official research department of the university. Arellano is one of the member higher educational institutions of the joint De La Salle University-CHED Zonal Research Center.

=== Academic partnerships ===
AU has several academic partners that aim to facilitate collaborations in teaching, research, joint study programs, staff and student exchange, professional certification, and continuing education. The academic partners include:

- Arizona State University
- Alderson Broaddus University
- Edith Cowan University
- Federation University Australia
- Guangxi Vocational and Technical College
- University of Plymouth
- Gunma University of Health and Welfare

== Athletics ==
The Arellano University Chiefs are the varsity athletic teams of the university, which is a member of the National Collegiate Athletic Association (NCAA) since joining in 2010 as a probationary member. which later attained its regular member status in NCAA Season 89 on April 2, 2013. The Chiefs also played in the NCRAA, NAASCU, V-League, and the Fr. Martin's Cup. The Chiefs are also a member of the Development League of the Philippine Basketball Association.

The name "Chiefs" was adopted in honor of the university's namesake Cayetano Arellano, the first Chief Justice of the Supreme Court of the Philippines

== Notable people ==
Persons affiliated to the university, either as students, faculty members, or administrators, are known as "Arellianites" and/or "Arellanistas". Throughout the university's history, faculty, alumni, and students have played prominent roles in many different fields. Prominent alumni of Arellano in the film and media industry include Jhong Hilario, Bayani Agbayani, Joey de Leon, and Ted Failon. Public servants who have attended Arellano include lawyer Higino A. Acala Sr., former Senator Rodolfo Biazon, actor and ongoing 4th District of Leyte congressman Richard Gomez, actor and former mayor of Parañaque Joey Marquez, former 4th District of Manila Congresswoman Trisha Bonoan-David, and actor and Manila mayor-elect Isko Moreno.

== Student life ==
The Standard is the official student publication of Arellano University. Operating across the university's seven campuses, the publication serves as the primary journalistic arm for the student body.
