= Harry Roque =

Filipino lawyer (born 1966)

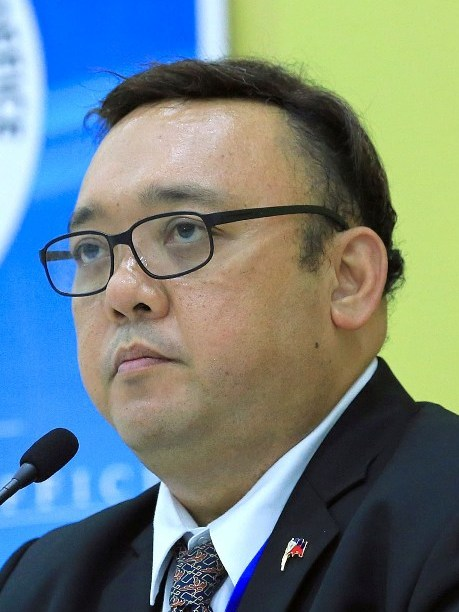
- Roque in 2017

Presidential Spokesperson
- In office April 13, 2020 – November 15, 2021
- President: Rodrigo Duterte
- Deputy: China Jocson
- Preceded by: Salvador Panelo
- Succeeded by: Karlo Nograles
- In office October 30, 2017 – October 15, 2018
- President: Rodrigo Duterte
- Deputy: China Jocson
- Preceded by: Ernesto Abella
- Succeeded by: Salvador Panelo

IATF-EID Spokesperson
- In office April 23, 2020 – November 15, 2021
- Preceded by: Karlo Nograles
- Succeeded by: Karlo Nograles

Member of the Philippine House of Representatives for Kabayan party-list
- In office July 25, 2016 – October 30, 2017 Serving with Ron Salo
- Succeeded by: Ciriaco Calalang

Personal details
- Born: Herminio Harry Lopez Roque Jr. October 21, 1966 (age 60) Pasay, Rizal, Philippines
- Party: PRP (2018–present); HNP (2018–present)
- Other political affiliations: KABAYAN (partylist; 2015–2017)
- Spouse: Mylah Reyes (m. 1999)
- Children: 2
- Education: University of Michigan (B.A.); University of the Philippines Diliman (LL.B.); London School of Economics (LL.M.)
- Occupation: Politician
- Profession: Lawyer

Herminio Harry Lopez Roque Jr. (Tagalog: [ˈrɔkɛ]; born October 21, 1966) is a Filipino lawyer, politician, former law professor, and a fugitive. He served as the presidential spokesperson of President Rodrigo Duterte from 2017 to 2018 and from 2020 to 2021. He was the party-list representative of KABAYAN from 2016 to 2017.

Roque taught constitutional law and public international law for 15 years at the University of the Philippines College of Law. In his law practice, he notably represented the victims of the Maguindanao massacre and the family of Jennifer Laude, a trans woman killed by a U.S. Marine.

Roque was originally opposed to Duterte's candidacy in 2016, describing him as a "self-professed murderer", but became a strong supporter after being appointed as Duterte's presidential spokesperson in October 2017. On November 22, 2017, he was designated presidential adviser for human rights concurrent with being the presidential spokesperson. Roque was a strong advocate for the Philippines' membership in the International Criminal Court, but later sided with President Duterte in withdrawing from the court in the late 2010s.

Roque is a member of the Advisory Council of the Asian Society of International Law (AsianSIL) and was president of AsianSIL from 2018 to 2019.

Once regarded as a staunch human rights advocate, Roque's transition into a chief defender of the Duterte administration—widely condemned for extrajudicial killings and rights abuses—drew sharp criticism. As of 2025, Roque faces multiple legal controversies, including contempt of Congress, disbarment petitions, and human trafficking charges linked to Philippine Offshore Gaming Operators (POGOs). He has since left the Philippines with a pending asylum application in the Netherlands.

== Education ==
Roque received his Bachelor of Arts (economics and political science) from the University of Michigan at Ann Arbor (1986), Bachelor of Laws from University of the Philippines Diliman (1990) and Master of Laws with merits from the London School of Economics (1996-1998).

== Legal career ==
Through the advocacy group Center for International Law (Centerlaw), of which he was one of the founders, Roque and his team represented victims of the 2009 Ampatuan massacre; the Malaya Lolas, victims of systematic rape and abuse by the Japanese Imperial Army; the family of the killed transgender Jennifer Laude; and the family of the murdered environmental advocate and media man Gerry Ortega of Palawan.

Roque has argued before the Supreme Court on several occasions. On the Supreme Court website, the retired Supreme Court Justice Antonio Eduardo B. Nachura identifies him "as among those who have impressed him when they had argued before the Supreme Court".

Among the cases Roque argued before the high court were questioning President Gloria Macapagal-Arroyo's Presidential Proclamation 1017 and General Order No. 5, placing the country under a State of Emergency partially unconstitutional for infringing on the constitutionally protected rights of free speech, peaceful assembly and freedom of the press. He is also among the five counsels allowed to argue specific issues raised against the Cybercrime Law. On another occasion, he represented the Integrated Bar of the Philippines in arguing that local government officials cannot deny applications for rally permits except on grounds that the conduct of the same will result in a clear and present danger to the state.

Roque also helped secure for Boracay Foundation a Temporary Environmental Protection Order (TEPO) to stop the reclamation of 42 hectares (100 acres) of land in Caticlan due to the absence of studies and guarantees that it would not damage Boracay Island. Roque won the first ever granted petition for the Writ of Amparo in favor of a journalist, as well as another petition for Amparo - the second application for writ of Amparo where the Court of Appeals issued protective orders.

Roque mentored and coached some of the UP College of Law moot teams that won in various competitions, including the 2015 Oxford Price Moot Court Competition in Oxford, UK, where the team beat 91 others. He also mentored the team that won prizes in the Red Cross International Humanitarian Law Moot Competition held in Hong Kong on March 18, 2015, and the team that won the championship on March 11–12, 2005. In March 2012, Team Philippines made it to the semi-finals of the 2012 Jessup International Law Moot Court competition in Washington, D.C.

Roque was nominated by the Philippine government to the International Law Commission in 2021. As part of his bid, he proposed an international treaty on equal COVID-19 vaccine access and the recognition of the permanent presence of states which could possibly sink below sea level due to global warming. Roque's bid was vehemently objected by various sectors such as the Bagong Alyansang Makabayan leftist group, around 150 lawyers, the Free Legal Assistance Group, the executive committee of his alma mater University of the Philippines Diliman, and the UP Integrated High School for being a part of President Rodrigo Duterte's administration. He failed to garner enough votes to win one of the eight seats in contention.

== Political career ==
=== Congressman ===
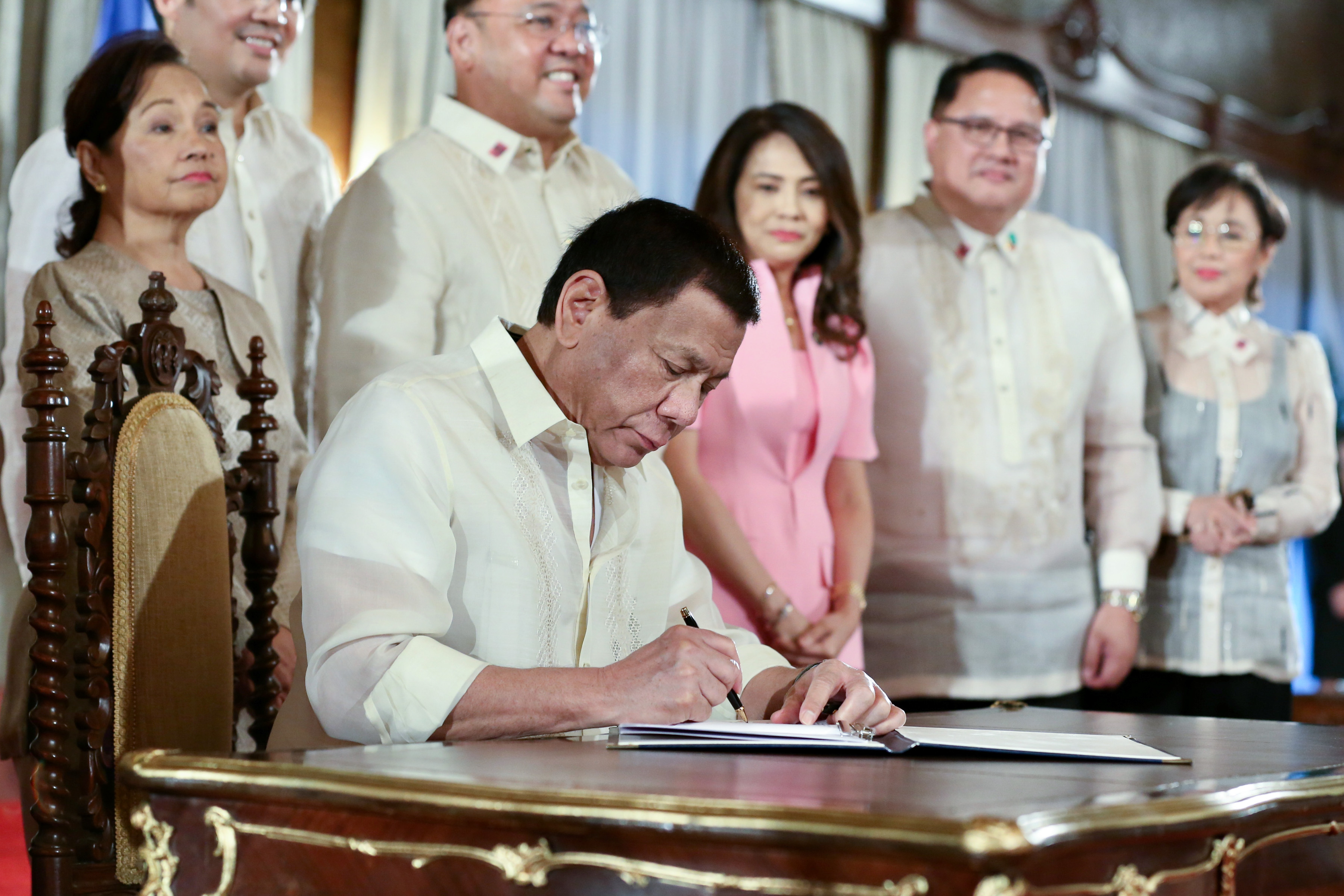
Roque (center, background) witnesses President Rodrigo Duterte sign the Universal Health Care Act at the Malacañang Palace on February 20, 2019.

After becoming a congressman in the 17th Congress, Roque resigned as a member of the Center for International Law (Centerlaw). He was the principal author of the Universal Health Coverage Law, the Philippine HIV and AIDS Policy Act, the Free Irrigation Service Act, an act establishing a national feeding program for public school pupils, and the Universal Access to Quality Tertiary Education Act.

Roque was also one of three representatives who endorsed the impeachment case against the former Comelec chairman, Andres Bautista.

=== Presidential spokesperson ===
Roque assumed the role of President Duterte's presidential spokesperson on November 6, 2017. According to Duterte, Roque was a fit for the role because like him, he has a "slightly naughty speaking style". Roque said that Duterte was looking for someone who could understand the remarks of the President, adding that the nature of his job required him to relay Duterte's positions.

=== 2019 Senate elections ===
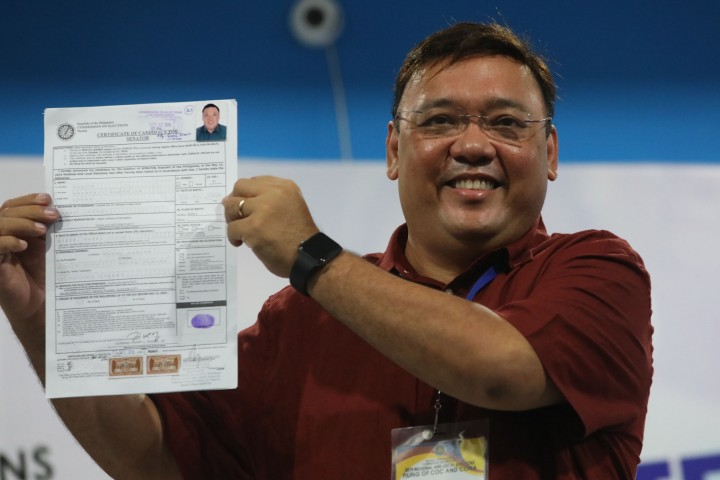
Roque files his Certificate of Candidacy for senator in 2019.

On October 5, 2018, Roque was reported to be interested to vie for a Senate seat in the 2019 elections. Duterte said that Roque had no chance in winning, saying that Roque had no support from the military; Duterte added he will just give Roque another role. Four days later, Roque was reported to have threatened to resign from his post after he was kept in the dark about Duterte's visit to a hospital on October 3. He eventually resigned on October 15, expressing his plans to run for a seat at the House of Representatives, under Luntiang Pilipinas Party. Roque later made his political plans official after filing his Certificate of Candidacy for Senator of the republic on October 17.

On February 1, 2019, Roque dropped out of the 2019 Senatorial race, citing a medical condition.

=== Return as the presidential spokesperson ===
In April 2020, Roque returned to his role as Duterte's presidential spokesperson, replacing Salvador Panelo, who replaced him in 2018.

Amid the COVID-19 pandemic on April 13, 2020, Roque assumed the role of spokesperson for the Inter-Agency Task Force for the Management of Emerging Infectious Diseases, replacing Karlo Nograles.

=== 2022 Senate elections ===
Roque filed his certificate of candidacy for the 2022 Senate election on November 15, 2021, which automatically deemed him resigned from his position as presidential and IATF spokesperson. After expressing desire to run as senator if Sara Duterte decides to run for a national position, Roque ran under the People's Reform Party, substituting the candidacy of Paolo Mario Martelino. Additionally, following a protest staged in New York City against his bid to get elected to the International Law Commission of the United Nations, Roque stated he "found resolve to run" to prevent the election of allies of what he deems as extremist groups. Roque lost in the Senate elections, finishing at 17th in a race to fill 12 seats.

=== Post-Malacañang activities ===
Roque was hired by real estate firm Whirlwind Corporation as a lawyer in 2023, and in the same year accompanied Whirlwind incorporator Cassandra Ong in visiting the Philippine Amusement and Gaming Corporation (PAGCOR) on two separate occasions to assist in settling documents for Lucky South 99 Outsourcing, Inc., a Philippine Offshore Gaming Operator (POGO) in Porac, Pampanga that has since been shut down due to illegal activities that occurred during its operation.

Roque had initially supported the presidency of Bongbong Marcos. However, by 2024, Roque became an ardent critic of Marcos, spreading the false information that he is an illegal drug user and repeatedly calling for him to resign.

== Criticism and controversies ==
=== Libel, cyber-libel lawsuits ===
On May 14, 2024, Antonio Trillanes IV filed defamation and cyberlibel complaint affidavits with the Quezon City Prosecutor's Office against Roque for alleged false accusations. Roque made allegations that Trillanes sold the Scarborough Shoal to China during his back-channel talks with Chinese leaders during the crisis in 2012. Roque welcomed Trillanes' filing of charges, saying "He who cannot fight in the free marketplace of ideas resort to the filing of libel cases! By filing these cases, he has proven to be an enemy of freedom of expression." A subpoena was issued by the Quezon City Prosecutor's Office on June 3 against Roque and political vlogger Byron "Banat By" Cristobal. On June 18, Roque filed a counter-affidavit and libel charges against Trillanes for alleged violations of Republic Acts No. 3019 (the Anti-Graft and Corrupt Practices Act) and No. 6713 (the Code of Conduct and Ethical Standards for Public Officials and Employees).

=== Contempt of Congress ===
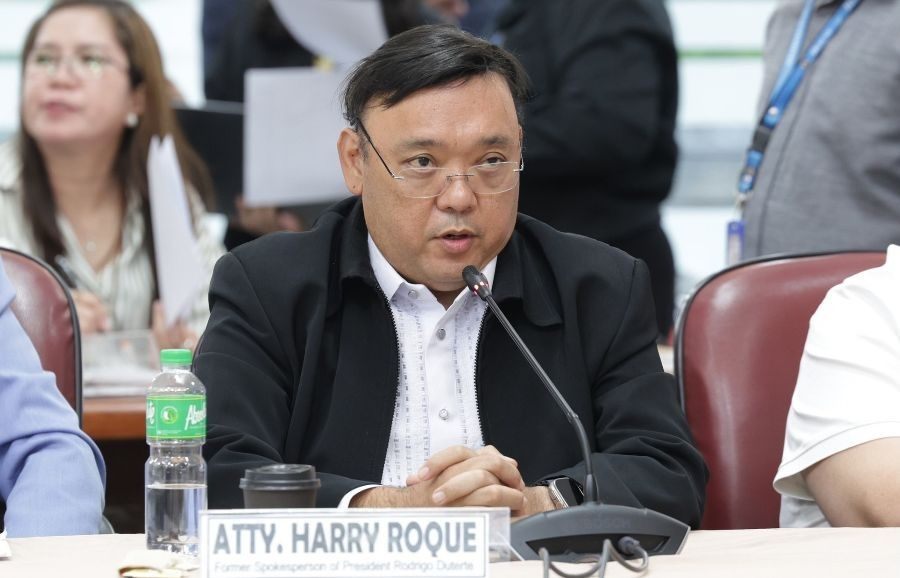
Roque at the Quad Committee hearing on August 23, 2024

In August 2024, the Philippines' House of the 19th Congress investigated Roque's alleged links with two Pampanga POGO companies as their lawyer. During the hearing, he was cited in contempt and placed under 24-hour detention for allegedly lying before the investigating House Committee. Dismissing claims that he lied, Roque said he merely made a mistake; he described his detention as the House's "abuse of power, harassment".

Roque reappeared in the House joint committee for the second time on September 12, but was cited again in contempt for not submitting certain financial records the committee ordered him to provide. He was placed under detention until the POGO hearings termination, or until his compliance with the subpoena duces tecum. Roque stated the documents requested were not related to POGOs and further urged the committee to instead file charges against him in court.

Days later, Roque was declared to be on the run. On Thursday, September 19, The Philippine National Police (PNP) Criminal Investigation and Detection Group (CIDG) provided an update on the supposed manhunt, but refrained from divulging specific details. Meanwhile, the Bureau of Immigration assured that Roque was still in the country.

Later on the same day, the House Quad Committee issued a show-cause order against Roque's wife, Mylah Roque, for failing to appear in hearings on the ongoing POGO investigations despite repeated invitations. However, Roque's daughter Bianca Hacintha filed the Writ of Amparo (Recurso de amparo), certiorari and prohibition petitions which sought a temporary protective order from the High Tribunal as relief against the enforcement of the arrest warrant and the subpoena duces tecum.

=== Links to POGO and human trafficking allegations ===
Roque was linked to the raided Lucky South 99 POGO firm in Porac, Pampanga, which faced allegations of human trafficking, torture, and cyber fraud. He served as legal counsel and was named co-respondent in a qualified human trafficking case filed by the Anti-Money Laundering Council, Presidential Anti-Organized Crime Commission, and NBI. Roque dismissed the charges as "fabricated".

By December 2024, Roque filed his counter-affidavit in Abu Dhabi, confirming he was no longer in the country.

==== Inclusion in Cassandra Ong qualified human trafficking case ====
On October 29, 2024, the Presidential Anti-Organized Crime Commission (PAOCC) and the PNP-CIDG included Roque as co-respondent in the non-bailable qualified Anti-Trafficking in Persons Act of 2003 case filed on August 30 by the Anti-Money Laundering Council, PAOCC, and the National Bureau of Investigation against Cassandra Ong, Alice Guo, and 32 others before the Department of Justice (DOJ) for their alleged involvement in the Lucky South 99 POGO operations. Roque called his inclusion in the charges as fabricated, further stating the PAOCC and the PNP-CIDG have no concrete evidence against him; he said he plans to file a counter-affidavit to defend himself against the charges.

By December 2024, Roque is already confirmed to be outside the Philippines having filed a counter-affidavit for qualified human trafficking case in Abu Dhabi in the United Arab Emirates.

=== Disbarment petition by Melvin Matibag ===
In September 2024, Roque has been reported to face a pending disbarment petition filed by former NTC head, Melvin Matibag. Matibag refused to divulge any details but cited Roque's social media posts that included a polvoron video of President Bongbong Marcos allegedly snorting drugs. Roque stated his social media post of the video "is protected by free speech under the privilege doctrine" and added that Marcos has not admitted nor denied the allegations in the video.

=== Self-exile from the Philippines ===
Roque is suspected to have left from the Philippines on September 2, 2024 with his last reported sighting being at Sanga-Sanga Airport in Tawi-Tawi. His presence in the United Arab Emirates (UAE) was confirmed two days later by the Philippine Ambassador to the UAE. However his presence in the Gulf state was only publicly confirmed by the Department of Justice on December 3, 2024, when he reportedly filed a counter-affidavit regarding his human trafficking case. However around this time, Roque mentioned he has left the UAE but is still in an undisclosed location outside the Philippines. He reportedly tried going to the United States but was stopped in Japan.

Following Rodrigo Duterte's arrest and detention in the International Criminal Court in March 2025, Roque announced he is seeking asylum in the Netherlands. He insisted he has to defend Duterte in the ICC as reason for his application. Roque would be dismissed from Duterte's defence team by March 18.

== Social media presence ==
Roque has an online program in social media called The Spox Hour, where he speaks about various political issues concerning the Philippines.

In June 2024, an old video clip featuring Roque and his guest OPM singer Ronnie Liang in The Spox Hour became viral on social media. In the video, Roque joked about if he managed to convince Liang to go topless he will follow suit. Liang guested in Roque's show during their visit to Dinagat Island in July 2022. The old video resurfaced in relation to an issue wherein documents from a POGO raided by the Presidential Anti-Organized Crime Commission in Porac, Pampanga linked Roque to 2016 Mr. Supranational Philippines winner Alberto Rodulfo "AR" Dela Serna; Serna, who then served as Roque's executive assistant, had his Europe travel costs funded by Roque.

== Personal life ==
Roque is a member of the United Church of Christ in the Philippines. In October 1999, he married Mylah Reyes, a television reporter from RPN whom he met during a congressional hearing. Reyes is Catholic and they had a interdenominational marriage. The couple have two children: Bianca Hacintha and Harrison Jacob. Both Bianca and Harrison, ages two and one respectively, were included as petitioners ("under the doctrine of inter-generational rights") in a 2003 petition before the Supreme Court that sought to compel the executive branch's transmission of the Rome Statute to the Senate in order to ratify the Philippines' membership in the International Criminal Court; the petition was eventually dismissed in July 2005.

== Electoral history ==
Electoral history of Harry Roque
Year	Office	Party	Votes received				Result
Year	Office	Party	Total	%	P.	Swing	Result
2016	Representative (Party-list)	Kabayan	840,393	2.60%	6th	—N/a	Won
2022	Senator of the Philippines	PRP	11,246,206	20.25%	17th	—N/a	Lost

House of Representatives of the Philippines
New title	Member of the Philippine House of Representatives for Kabayan; 2016–2017; Served alongside: Ron Salo	Succeeded by Ciriaco Calalang
Political offices
Preceded by Ernesto Abella	Presidential Spokesperson; 2017–2018	Succeeded by Salvador Panelo
Preceded by Salvador Panelo	Presidential Spokesperson; 2020–2021	Succeeded by Karlo Nograles
Preceded by Karlo Nograles	IATF-EID Spokesperson; 2020-2021	Succeeded by Karlo Nograles
