= Huaibei Mining Group =

Chinese coal mining company

Huaibei Coal Mining Group (Chinese: 淮北矿业(集团)) is a state-owned coal mining company based in Huaibei, Anhui, China. It was founded in 1958.
