= Arellano University School of Education =

The Arellano University School of Education (formerly as the School of Education and Normal) is the academic unit of Arellano University that is devoted to scholarship in the field of education. The school conducts review classes for Licensure Examination for Teachers. It was in partnership with Hailida International Kindergarten School located in Shenzhen, China, which serves as a training ground for the students. It currently offers the courses of Bachelor of Elementary Education (BEED) and Bachelor of Secondary Education (BSED) and the Teacher Certificate Program (TCP) for degree earners who would like to take the Licensure Examination for Teachers (LET). It currently spans 9 programs. These course were offered on all campuses of the university.
