= Minnan Normal University =

University in Zhangzhou, China

Coordinates: 24.50748°N 117.64535°E

- Type: Public university
- Established: 1958
- Administrative staff: 1,257
- Students: 25,699
- Undergraduates: 17,892
- Location: Zhangzhou, Fujian, People's Republic of China
- Campus: Urban
- Website: www.mnnu.edu.cn

Minnan Normal University, (Chinese: 闽南师范大学; pinyin: Mǐnnán Shīfàn Dàxué; Pe̍h-ōe-jī: Bân-lâm Su-hōan Tāi-ha̍k) previously known as Zhangzhou Normal University (Chinese: 漳州师范学院; pinyin: Zhāngzhōu Shīfàn Xuéyuàn; Pe̍h-ōe-jī: Chiang-chiu Su-hōan Ha̍k-īⁿ) is a public university located in Zhangzhou, Fujian, China.

== Location ==
Minnan Normal University is located in Zhangzhou, Fujian Province, a city on the west coast of the Taiwan Straits.

== History ==
The university was founded in 1963 as the Fujian No.2 Normal College. Between 1965 and 1969, the university had to stop enrolling students due to revolutions in culture. In 1986, with the approval of the State Education Committee, the former Fujian No.2 Normal College was renamed as Zhangzhou Normal University. In 1992, the university was authorized to confer bachelor degrees, and, in 2000, it was among the first batch of normal colleges and universities in passing the qualification evaluation by the Ministry of Education in the teaching of undergraduates. In 2003, it was authorized to confer master degrees, after passing the evaluation by the Academic Degree Appraisal Committee of the State Council, and began to take in candidates of master's degrees. In 2008, Zhangzhou Normal University received a straight-A score in the undergraduate level Teaching Appraisal, organized by the Ministry of Education. In April 2013, Zhangzhou Normal University was renamed Minnan Normal University.

== Administration structure ==
=== Staff ===
Zhangzhou Normal University has 1,257 total faculty and staff, among whom 878 are full-time professional teachers, including 236 professors or associate professors.

=== Faculty structure ===
The university currently consists of 18 departments or schools, such as the Department of Chinese Language and Literature, Department of Foreign Languages and Literature, Department of Mathematics and Information Science, and School of Overseas Education. The school has 47 undergraduate programs and 12 master programs in total.

=== Student ===
The university's matriculation is open to students from all over the country and from abroad. It has a total enrollment of 25,699: 17,892 full-time undergraduate students, 148 master students, and 7,659 adult education students.

== Campus ==
Zhangzhou Normal University covers a total area of 1,153,000 square metres (12,410,000 sq ft), with a total floor space of 510,000 square metres (5,500,000 sq ft). The universities library contains 1,265,000 books and 1,108,000 electronic books and periodicals.

== Research ==
Zhangzhou Normal University has set up 26 research institutes, such as the Fujian-Taiwan Cultural Research Institute, the Educational Science Research Institute, the Applied Psychology Research Institute, the Applied Chemistry Research Institute, and the Human Resources Research Institute. It has two provincial laboratories, one provincial humanities and social sciences base.

The university has hosted international and domestic academic symposiums such as the International Symposium of Chinese Style of Metrical Composition, the International Symposium of General Topology and the International Symposium of Lin Yutang Study.

Since 2004, the university has been permitted to set up 450 scientific research projects, among which 6 are state-funded projects of natural sciences, 3 are state-funded projects of social sciences, 3 are humanities and social sciences projects funded by the Chinese Ministry of Education and 12 are projects awarded as prizes for achievements in scientific research at the provincial and ministerial levels. 2,631 theses were published in academic journals domestically and abroad, with 134 pieces included in SCI, EI and ISTP.
