= Huanbei (disambiguation) =

Huanbei is the site of a Bronze Age city on the northern outskirts of the modern city of Anyang in Henan province, China.

Huanbei may also refer to:

- Huanbei metro station, a station of the Taoyuan Airport MRT
- Huanbei Subdistrict (洹北街道), Beiguan, Anyang, Henan Province, China

== See also ==
- Huaibei
