= Arellano University School of Law =

Law school in Pasay, Philippines

- Parent school: Arellano University
- Established: 1938
- Dean: Domingo Navarro
- Location: Taft Avenue Corner Menlo St., Pasay, Philippines
- Bar pass rate: 66.18% (2017)
- Website: www.arellanolaw.edu

The Arellano University School of Law (AUSL) is the law school of Arellano University. AUSL was established in 1938. The school is managed by the Arellano Law Foundation, a non-stock and non-profit organization established by the alumni and faculty members of AU in 1979. AUSL is considered a model institution by the Commission on Higher Education for providing quality education and producing successful graduates. Since 2000, the school has operated Lawphil, an online repository of Philippine jurisprudence, statutes, executive orders, and similar documents.
