= Huaibei Normal University =

University in Huaibei, China

Coordinates: 33.982°N 116.810°E

Huaibei Normal University (Chinese: 淮北师范大学), formerly Huaibei Coal Industry Teachers College (Chinese: 淮北煤炭师范学院), is an institution of higher learning in Huaibei, Anhui Province, an energy base of the People's Republic of China.

== History ==
The college was founded in 1974, then as Anhui Normal University, Huaibei Campus. Upon approval of the State Council in December 1978, it was renamed Huaibei Coal Industry Teachers College, affiliated to then Ministry of Coal Industry. In 1981, it was approved to award bachelor's degrees.

Since September 1998, the college has been under the jurisdiction of both central and local governments, and mainly administered by Anhui Province. In 2003, it was approved to award master's degrees.

In 2010, it changed its name to Huaibei Normal University.
