= Ciriaco Calalang =

Philippine legal academic and politician

Member of the Philippine House of Representatives for Kabayan
- In office January 20, 2018 – September 23, 2018 Serving with Ron Salo
- Preceded by: Harry Roque
- Succeeded by: Paul Hernandez

Personal details
- Born: Ciriaco S. Calalang; 1950 or 1951
- Died: September 23, 2018 (aged 67) Quezon City, Metro Manila, Philippines
- Cause of death: Stroke
- Party: Kabalikat ng Mamamayan
- Children: 3 (adopted)
- Occupation: Politician
- Profession: Lawyer

Ciriaco S. "Acoy" Calalang (1950/1951 – September 23, 2018) was a Philippine legal academic and politician representing Kabalikat ng Mamamayan.

== Career ==
Calalang was a university professor who thought law. He was a lawyer by profession who specialized in taxation. He also worked as a volunteer lawyer for the Department of Social Welfare and Development under secretary Gloria Macapagal Arroyo from 1998 to 2000.

=== Kabayan representative (2018) ===
Ciriaco Calalang was a member of the House of Representatives for the Kabalikat ng Mamamayan (Kabayan) party-list. The group won two seats at the 2016 election which was filled in by Ron Salo and Harry Roque. Calalang was the third nominee and therefore was not immediately seated. Kabayan expelled Roque from the group on January 12, 2017, and sought Calalang as replacement as the next-in-line nominee. Roque disputes his removal but vacated his seat after he was appointed as presidential spokesperson.

Despite Roque's continued opposition, Calalang took office on January 20, 2018. He filed ten bills and eight resolutions. Kabayan also hailed him as a "champion of the rights of children".

In January 2018, he and his colleague Ron Salo proposed to move the seat of government of the Philippines from Metro Manila to Davao City. He also proposed the establishment of a Department of Disaster Resilience, with the legislation included in the priority legislative agenda of President Rodrigo Duterte. He also proposed every August 12 be recognized as National Youth Day.

== Death ==
Calalang was admitted to the De Los Santos Medical Center for surgery on September 17. He died of a stroke in hospital on September 23, 2018, aged 67.

== Personal life ==
Calalang had three adopted children. The biological father of the three children was a Department of Labor employee who got killed in an ambush. The eldest was only three years old at the time.
