= Gambling in Taiwan =

公益彩券統一識別標誌

Gambling in Taiwan is prohibited by the Criminal Code of the Republic of China. State-run lotteries, like the Uniform Invoice lottery, are the only legal form of gambling on mainland Taiwan. The construction of casinos on some off-shore islands was legalized in 2009, though to date none have been built. Some gambling-style games (such as cards and mahjong) are allowed either on special days or under special restricted circumstances.

== History ==
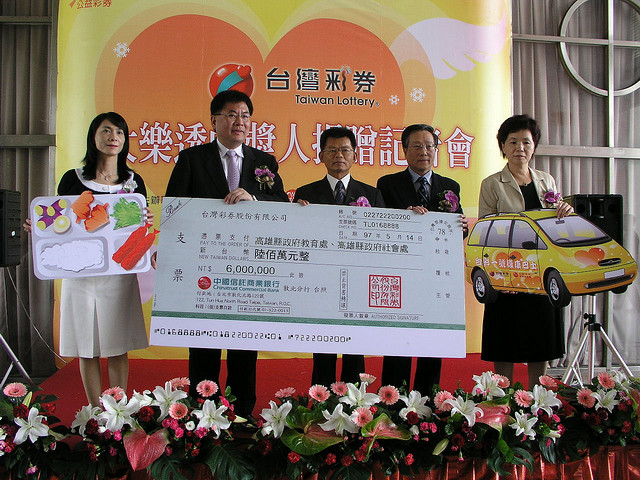
A presentation to the winner of a Taiwanese lottery in 2008. Government lotteries are among the only legal forms of gambling in Taiwan.

Taiwan has a long history of gambling, with widespread activity during the 17th, 18th and 19th century Qing Dynasty era. Locals partook in more than 100 well-known gambling games. According to historians, the most popular game was the flower match game which became popular to the point of social disruption;

The peak of the flower match game was in 1896, with many citizens wallowed in gambling and unable to stop. This caused some people to become robbers and others to even sold their daughters to brothels to pay their gambling debts.

Thereafter, Taiwanese authorities began introducing a range of restrictions on gaming, including an attempted (but ultimately failed) ban in 1897. During the period of Japanese colonization, gambling continued in Taiwan with illegal gambling supported by Japanese organized crime.

Introduced in 1935, the Criminal Code of the Republic of China prohibited both public gambling and the provision of venues for gamblers to assemble (e.g., casinos). Under the law, gamblers are allowed to play cards for non-currency items like matchsticks and citizens can play games like mahjong at Chinese New Year under "temporary amusement" clauses.

The popular Patriotic Lottery was active between 1950 and 1987 to raise funds for the government. In 1951, Taiwan introduced the Uniform Invoice lottery. Other forms of gambling like casino-style gaming, poker machines and bookmaking remain illegal. Some political figures have claimed that, as a result, illegal casinos, gaming and sports betting have thrived. In 1997, three well-known Taiwanese baseball players confessed to having fixed matches at the behest of illegal gambling syndicates.

Over the course of the last decade, Taiwan's legislature has debated a number of proposals aiming to legalize casino-style gaming.

== Online gambling ==
In recent years, online gambling sites have become popular with Taiwanese citizens seeking forms of gaming not offered in Taiwan itself and gaming with better odds than state-run lotteries. The turn away from state lotteries has led to major losses by the banks that run them, like the Taipei Fubon Bank. By 2003, there were already 2,000 online gaming sites available to Taiwanese customers. According to the deputy commander for technology at the Criminal Investigation Division of Keelung City;

The abundance of illegal gambling websites also proved difficult to crack down upon due to their high mobility, let alone the legal websites, which have resulted in many social problems as gamblers do not know whom to seek help from for their addictions.

In 2003, the Criminal Investigation Bureau announced it was referring 300 Taiwanese customers of the United Kingdom–based online gaming site, Sportingbet, for prosecution. The company maintained it had done nothing wrong and had not breached Taiwan's laws.

== Illegal gambling ==
In January 2013, Taiwanese authorities announced they were investigating the alleged transfer of US$180 million from Taiwanese gamblers to casinos in Macau by the Taiwan-based branch of Melco Crown, a joint venture of Hong Kong–based Melco International and Australia-based Crown Limited.

In February 2013, authorities revealed they were investigating claims that desperate gamblers, looking for any opportunity to place bets, had established a betting-ring so they could wager on the life expectancy of terminally ill cancer patients. Reports suggested that the families of poor patients had agreed to participate because it allowed them to pay for a decent funeral for their relative. The following month, a "mid-level" prosecutor was indicted on unrelated corruption charges following accusations she helped to cover up illegal gambling operations and pressured other prosecutors to cease investigating illegal gaming operations.

== Legalization of offshore gaming facilities ==
In 2009, legislative amendments to the Offshore Islands Development Act legalized the establishment of casinos on the islands of Kinmen, Matsu, and Penghu if more than 50% of local residents agreed in a referendum. To date, though a number of such facilities have been proposed, none have been opened. Despite the amendment, US-based gaming experts have suggested that completion of a casino anywhere within Taiwanese territory is unlikely before 2017.

In 2013, Green Party Taiwan central executive committee member and candidate, Pan Han-shen, published a scathing opinion-editorial piece in the Taipei Times claiming that proposed casinos, if built, would become "cess pools" of corruption that would encourage money laundering.

Since the announcement of the most recent proposals, Premier, Jiang Yi-huah, has reaffirmed his view that any move to legalize gambling on mainland Taiwan would require a "national consensus".

== Recent proposals ==
=== Penghu Islands proposal ===
In 2009, shortly after the passing of the Offshore Islands Development Act, the residents of the Penghu Islands became the first to hold a referendum on the development of a local casino. The residents rejected the casino-resort plan 17,359 votes to 13,397. Though only 42% of eligible voters cast ballots, the result was nonetheless valid and binding.

=== Matsu Islands proposal ===
In 2012, the residents of the Matsu Islands voted in favor of allowing the construction of a casino on the islands - 57% supportive, 43% opposed - surpassing the 50% rate of support required for such a proposal to pass. The population of the islands has since increased dramatically, with an increased population support rate of 11.24% since the referendum.

William Weidner, of Weidner Resorts Taiwan and US lobby group Freedom's Watch, is behind the US$8 billion proposal to build a casino on Matsu. He has pledged US$2.5 billion (part of the total $8 billion) to improve local infrastructure, including an upgrade of the Matsu Beigan Airport. But his proposal has drawn some criticism after he suggested that plans for the casino (along with local infrastructure funding) might be withdrawn if the Government of Taiwan does not move quickly enough to amend laws as necessary.

=== New Taipei City proposal ===
In 2013, at the celebration for Chinese New Year, tycoon Terry Gou proposed the development of a Las Vegas-style casino industry in New Taipei City and additional "convention and exhibition facilities" in the Tamsui District. Mayor Eric Chu agreed that such a plan would make the city more competitive and would attract more foreign tourists.

=== Keelung Islet proposal ===
Gou has also suggested that a casino could be established on the Keelung Islet, a 23 ha island formerly used as a military training off the Taiwanese coast near the port city of Keelung. The plan would involve the use of a decommissioned cruise ship with existing on-board casino, hospitality and accommodation facilities.

== See also ==
- Gambling in China
- Gambling in Macau
- Gambling in Hong Kong
