= Da Jia Le =

Da Jia Le (Chinese: 大家樂; lit. 'happiness for everyone') was an illegal gambling game popular in Taiwan during the 1980s.

Inspired by Mark Six in Hong Kong and something similar, Da Jia Le players selected five to ten numbers (depending on the variant) from 00 to 99. The prize increased if players won more numbers. The winning numbers were primarily based on the Patriotic Lottery issued by the Taiwanese government. To respond to it, the government attempted to suspend announcements of winning numbers, reducing lottery issues, and ultimately discontinuing the Patriotic Lottery in 1987. Players, however, simply switched to using numbers from other sources such as Uniform Invoice or Mark Six in Hong Kong. Da Jia Le declined after the 1980s due to public concerns over crime risks (such as scams, embezzlement, and organised crime), as well as the rise of investment markets in Taiwan, which attracted capital and reduced interest in gambling.

At the time, Da Jia Le players would pray to local deities for luck and drop deity statues once they lost, resulting in the accumulation of abandoned statues. Xihan Temple near the Fude Pit Sanitary Landfill was established to house abandoned statues.
