= Gambling in Hong Kong =

The Gambling Ordinance was enacted in 1977 to regulate gambling in Hong Kong. The Home and Youth Affairs Bureau is now responsible for formulating gambling policy and monitoring its implementation. People are allowed gamble for leisure and entertainment within these regulations at a limited number of authorized outlets. Social gambling is still allowed.

== Legality ==
The government of Hong Kong restricts organized gambling to a few regulated outlets. The government enacted the Gambling Ordinance in 1977 to rein in excessive gambling while still providing gambling to the populace. Gambling involving a bookmaker is illegal in Hong Kong. Betting with a bookmaker and betting in a place other than a gambling establishment is illegal. The Hong Kong Jockey Club holds a government-granted monopoly on horse races, football matches, and lotteries. The revenue the club generates from various wagers makes it the largest taxpayer for the government.

Hong Kong generates the largest horse race gambling turnover in the world. The Hong Kong Jockey Club founded in 1884, holds a monopoly on horse racing wagers, lotteries and football betting and is the largest taxpayer to the government. In 2009, Hong Kong generated an average US$12.7 million in gambling turnover per race 6 times larger than its closest rival France at US$2 million while the United States only generated $250,000.

During the 2014-2015 racing season the Hong Kong Jockey Club attracted about HK$138.8 million (US$17.86 million) per race more that any other track in the world. Hong Kong Jockey Club broke its own record during the 2016-2017 season with a turnover of HK$216.5 billion and paid the government HK$21.7 billion in duty and profits tax, an all-time high.

The Hong Kong Government was set to roll out legal basketball betting in late 2026 earlier, but later halted its implementation in mid-April 2026 allegedly due to concerns over the surge of prediction markets.

== Charities ==
Hong Kong has charities which have a goal to promoting responsible gambling practices among those who gamble and to minimizing the negative effects of problem gambling. Such charities also look for a balance between meeting the demand for gambling and maximizing the social and economic benefits of gambling for the community, while helping to minimize potential harm to individuals and the community.

== Recent events ==
During the 2010 World Cup, police arrested 25 people for having an illegal gambling ring that took bets on World Cup matches worth more than 66 million Hong Kong dollars. Earlier in the year the Hong Kong police set up a task force to help stop illegal football gambling.

== See also ==
- Home and Youth Affairs Bureau
- Hong Kong Gamblers Recovery Centre
- Culture of Hong Kong
- Gambling in China
- Gambling in Macau
- Gambling in Taiwan
- Mahjong culture
- Mahjong school
