= Tourist Garden Hotel =

Hotel in Lapu-Lapu City, Philippines

- 皇家一号度假村
- Interactive map of Tourist Garden Hotel
- Location: 10°16′47.5″N 123°59′11.3″E
- Opened: September 13, 2019
- Closed: September 2, 2024
- Casino type: Philippine offshore gaming operator hub
- Website: touristgardenhotel.wixsite.com

The Tourist Garden Hotel (Chinese: 皇家一号度假村) was a hotel in Lapu-Lapu City in Cebu, Philippines.

== History ==
The property where the Tourist Garden Hotel is owned by a Cebuano businessman and was leased to the Zhao Long in 2018 through a 30-year contract. Initially there is a hotel building and two smaller "totally inhabitable" buildings. The Chinese lessee expanded the hotel complex. The complex grew to consist of 13 buildings.

In August 2019, the National Bureau of Investigation (NBI) conducted an operation to rescue alleged trafficked Chinese women at the Royal One KTV of the hotel. Mayor Junard Chan personally inspected the site to confirm the documentary requirements. The associated case was also dismissed.

The Tourist Garden Hotel had its grand opening on September 13, 2019 which was attended by Mayor Chan. The hotel under its Chinese operators was run as a "semi-private" establishment with only foreigners reportedly allowed.

Three Indonesians escaped from the hotel in July 2024, which prompted the Indonesian embassy to report Philippine authorities. In a raid conducted next month, an illegal Philippine offshore gaming operator or casino hub was discovered within the hotel. The operators were alleged to be running a love scam scheme. 162 foreign nationals were found inside.

On September 2, 2024, Mayor Chan ordered the hotel's closure.
