= Mahjong culture =

Traditions and practices around the game mahjong

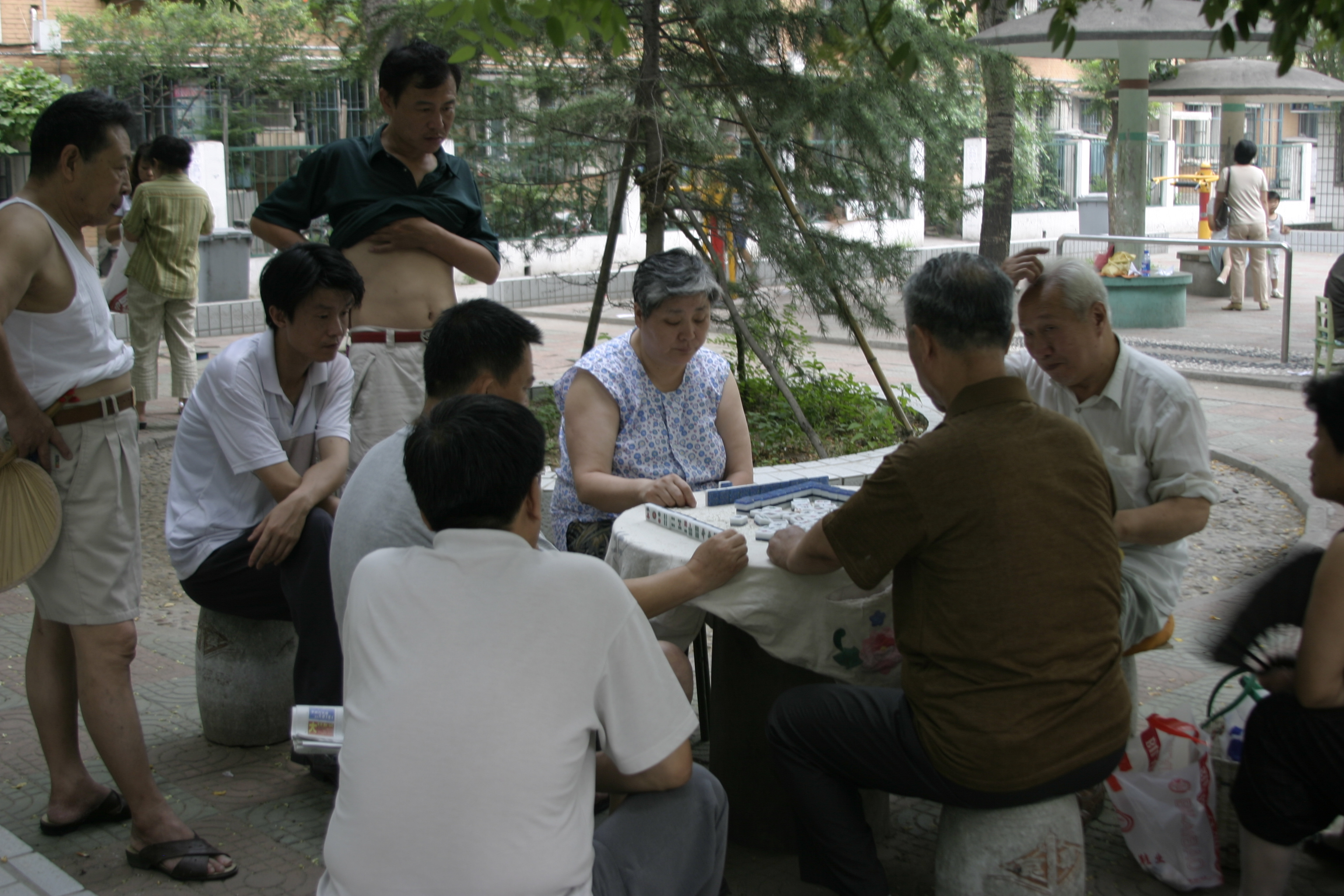
People playing Mahjong in the streets of Beijing near the Sanyuan Bridge

Mahjong (English pronunciation: /mɑːˈdʒɒŋ/ mah-JONG) culture refers to the various traditions, customs, beliefs, and practices surrounding the game of mahjong, a popular tile-based game originating in China. It is played in other East Asian countries, such as Japan, Korea, Vietnam, and Taiwan, as well as in other parts of the world. Mahjong has a long-spanning history that dates back more than a century. It has evolved over time to include different regional variations and cultures. The game has also become an important aspect of social life in many communities, often played at family gatherings, social events, and even in professional settings.

== China ==
The exact origins of mahjong are debated, but it emerged in the area around Shanghai in the mid- to late-1800s. Within years, the game became extremely popular across China. There were local and regional variations, as there are today, but the game at its core was prevalent across the entire country. The game started to become heavily associated with gambling, smoking opium, and wasting time. As such, during the late Qing reforms, mahjong became considered a social issue. Mahjong started to become outlawed indirectly as gambling and smoking opium became criminalized. The ban was not very successful, however, at least until the Chinese cultural revolution. During the cultural revolution, mahjong was considered a part of “old culture”, leading to nearly all mahjong-related paraphernalia being outlawed and/or destroyed.

After the end of Mao's control, mahjong again became popular in the country as government and social reforms changed and became less restrictive.

== Culture and practices ==
Mahjong, outside of being a game, is also widely considered to be a social activity that has been used to build relationships and create a sense of community. Being invited to play mahjong is seen as a form of kinship and acceptance in some cultures. In China, mahjong is closely related to teahouse culture where players gather to play and socialize. Mahjong is played almost anywhere a table is available or can be set up. This ranges from people's homes, streets, and sidewalks, or even workplaces. Indeed, playing mahjong can be considered a form of social gathering.

Some consider mahjong to be primarily luck and only partly skill. As such, divination and fortune play a large part in mahjong. There are many practices or rituals relating to the luck or fortune of the players in the game. Failing to properly execute them gives the player negative fortune, leading to the player's loss.

For example, the seating arrangement of the players in mahjong is believed to bring either great luck or great misfortune, determining the outcome of the game. Seating arrangements must be determined randomly and given to the supernatural, so as to give everyone fair chances. Methods of determining seating arrangements vary across different cultures, but seating arrangements are almost always determined randomly.

Additionally, arranging the table at an angle, unaligned with the surrounding walls, is said to promote good fortune by aligning it with the mahjong ghosts.

Mahjong players also have many superstitious beliefs, some examples are:

- Going to the bathroom and washing your hands can fix your luck.
- Beginner's luck, the idea that beginners will experience more wins.
- Tapping a player's shoulder is bad luck for the player.
- An opening-game victory gives bad luck.

Additionally, expensive Mahjong sets can be seen as a status symbol and are a source of pride among families.

== Prevalence in other parts of the world ==
=== United States ===
Mahjong was brought to the United States in the 1920s by Joseph Park Babcock. It was imported into the U.S. during a time when many Americans had held ancient China in high regard but held racial prejudice against contemporary Chinese. Mahjong was marketed as an exotic and mystical game played in ancient China and it quickly gained popularity. Despite the anti-Chinese sentiment in the era, the game was played by many Americans, including Chinese Americans who saw the game as a way to connect with their Chinese heritage while also playing a trendy game.

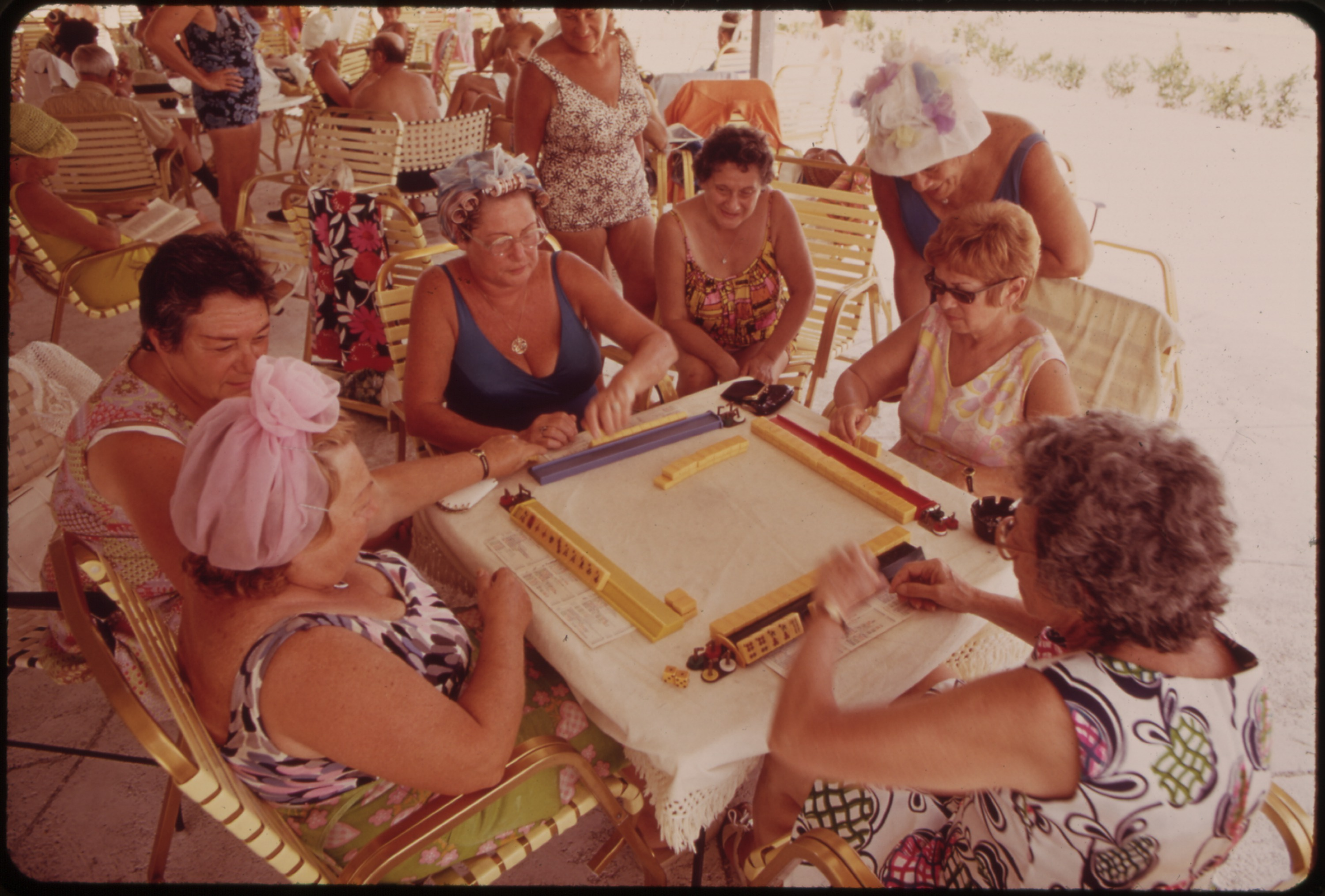
Group of women playing mahjong in Palm Beach, Florida, United States

Initially, the game was male-dominated, but over the course of the mahjong craze, it started to become more associated with women and femininity. Historian Annelise Heinz argues that the change was brought on by “the merging of American gendered ideas of Chinese culture with the strengthened association of women as archetypal consumers."

Another aspect of mahjong's popularity in the U.S. is its unique appeal to Jewish families, particularly women, even after the initial mahjong craze. Hoping to revitalize the game, a group of Jewish women from New York established the national Mah-Jongg League. By the mid-20th century, after World War II, Mahjong games became lodged in many Jewish-American families, offering a space for socializing, networking, and entertainment.

A less well-known but still prevalent form of mahjong was created on the Wright-Patterson Air Force Base in the 1940's. Wright-Patterson Mah Jongg was created by the wives of Air Force members who were interested in the game during the mahjong craze, but disagreed on what rulesets to use. This ruleset is still in use today, primarily by military spouses.

For young people in their 20s and 30s trying to combat the loneliness epidemic, there has been a shift to join board game clubs, including mahjong clubs like Green Tile Social Club in New York City, Honour Tile Society in Denver, and Mahjong Mistress in Los Angeles. Moreover, many first- or second-generation Asian Americans did not grow up playing mahjong because their parents felt the game carried a stigma of degeneracy and gambling. These parents are sometimes called the lost generation of mahjong players because they were too busy trying to live the American middle-class life. Celebrities such as Julia Roberts, Sarah Jessica Parker and Kelly Ripa have also been advocating for mahjong.

=== Japan ===
Mahjong was brought to Japan by soldier Saburo Hirayama in 1924; Hirayama opened a mahjong school and parlor to introduce the game to Japanese citizens. Much like in America, the game had spread across the country and became widely popular. As of 2007, Japan has some twenty-two thousand mahjong parlors across the country, with at least five thousand of them inside Tokyo alone. Additionally, in Chiba, Japan, there is a mahjong museum that showcases the history of the game. Mahjong was the most popular game in Japan in 2010. Today, a considerable amount of mahjong in Japan is played digitally through the internet and software.

=== Hong Kong ===
In Hong Kong:

- During a Chinese wedding banquet, guests play Mahjong during the waiting time.
- A count-down Mahjong before the Chinese New Year or the New Year is a typical practice for many Hong Kong families.
- While most people have a Mahjong set at home, most Chinese restaurants offer sets of Mahjong equipment for their customers.
- Officially, casinos are illegal in Hong Kong. However, there are legal Mahjong schools, where gamblers can play Mahjong.
- The elderly are encouraged to play Mahjong as brain exercise.
- To invite a person to a Mahjong game is an indication of friendliness in Chinese Culture.

However, Mahjong games also create problems. Addiction to Mahjong is a common type of problem gambling. Mahjong is also a favourite medium for bribery - the person giving the bribe will intentionally lose large sums of money to the person being bribed.

=== Philippines ===
In the Philippines, games of mahjong are played graveside as a form of honoring the dead, specifically on All Souls’ Day.

=== Malaysia ===
Mahjong remains popular among Malaysia’s ethnic Chinese communities, where it is frequently played in homes, cafés, and community centers as a form of social entertainment. A distinct three-player variant is also common in Malaysia, one of several countries where this version of the game is regularly played.

== See also ==
- Gambling in Hong Kong

== Sources ==
- Rep, Jelte (2012). The Great Mahjong Book: History, Lore, and Play. Tuttle Publishing. ISBN 978-1-4629-0496-9. OCLC 779828750.
