= Green Tile Social Club =

New York City-based Mahjong club

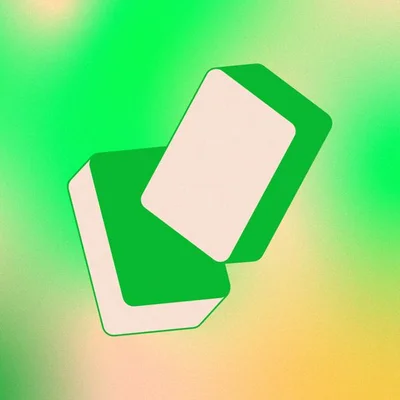
- Green Tile Social Club logo
- Abbreviation: GTSC
- Formation: May 2022; 4 years ago
- Founder: Joanne Xu; Sarah Teng; Grace Liu; Ernest Chan
- Purpose: social, education
- Location: New York City, United States of America
- Website: greentilesocialclub.com

Green Tile Social Club (GTSC) is a New York City-based social club to teach and play mahjong. The mission of the club is to "connect with and give back to the Asian American community" as a way celebrate Asian American culture. The social club has also become a replacement or supplemental to traditional nightlife, which has attracted many Gen Zers due to their shifting priorities and social habits. The club plays the Hong Kong style of mahjong.

== Origins ==
Mahjong is this pastime that represents play and downtime, and those weren’t privileges that were afforded to our parents and grandparents as they were trying to survive here. There was a lost years era where it became a household game and then it disappeared from the public eye.

— Joanne Xu, "Breaking Down the Walls" by Lynn Q. Yu at Slate published Oct 19, 2024

Asian Americans Joanne Xu, Sarah Teng, Grace Liu, and Ernest Chan all graduated from University of Texas at Austin before separately moving to New York City. Chan learned how to play mahjong while watching his relatives in Hong Kong and Teng was taught by international students she met while earning her master's degree.

After moving to the city, they all started playing mahjong at Teng's apartment together. Chan first posted on their Instagram story looking for New York friends to play mahjong with, and Liu and Teng joined first. They were looking for a fourth member, and Teng reached out to Xu. The initial meeting created a bond over commonalities in their desire to reconnect with their respective cultures and identity.

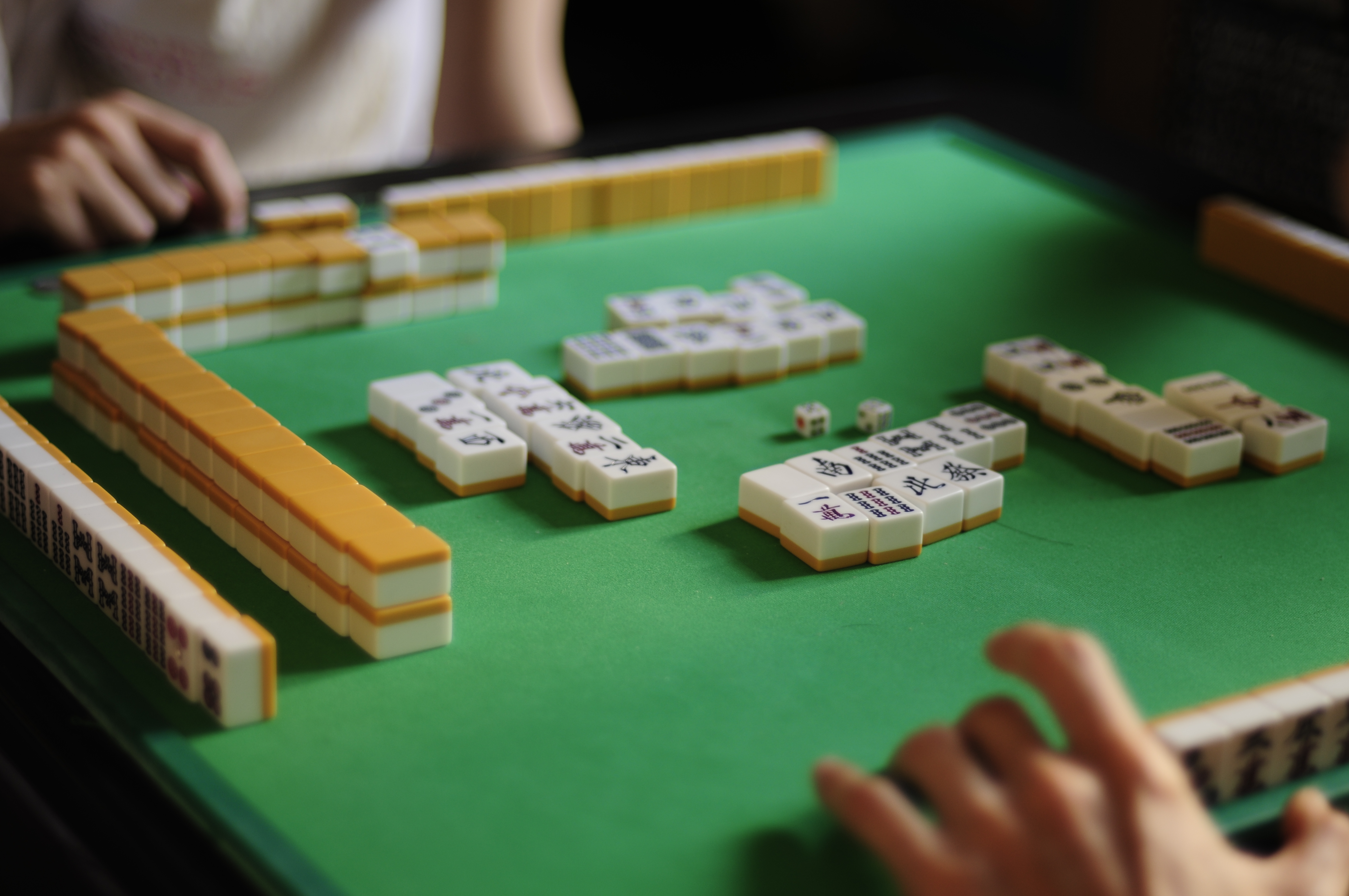
An example view of people playing mahjong

The gathering started out as a regular Sunday event, but then more friends asked to join them. Xu and others saw this as a growing demand among young Asian Americans for the game and for community. The club was founded in May 2022 and organized by Xu, Teng, Liu, and Chan as their side hustles to their full-time jobs. The first meeting was at the waterfront park Pier 35 in New York and played on two concrete tables. The first meet up event in May 2022 was at the Market Line at Essex Market.

Other mahjong clubs exist in New York City, but Green Tile Social Club is unique in that it was created as a community for younger players, which contrasts the typical association with older family relatives, but also serves as to bridge the gap between generations.

== Events ==
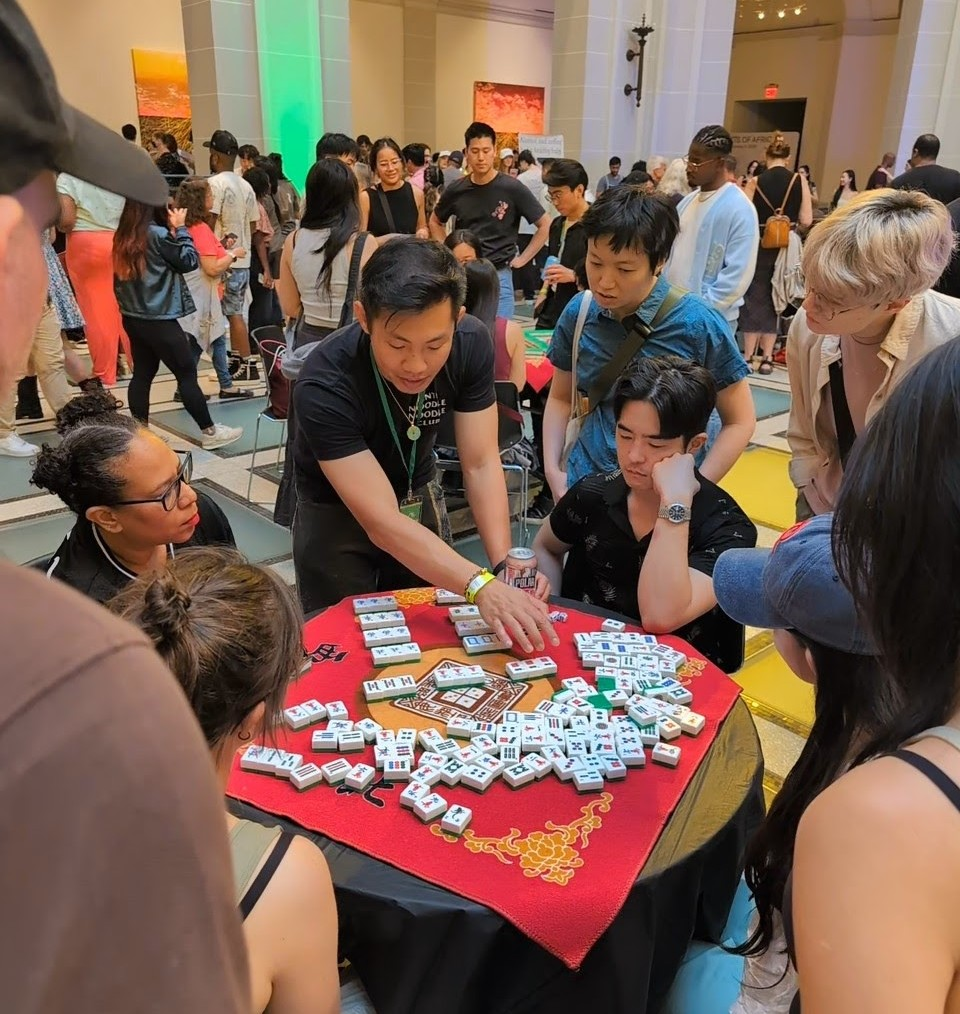
Beginner mahjong lessons hosted by a Green Tile Social club teacher at the Brooklyn Museum's First Saturdays event in May 2025

In early 2023, the club started offering paid ticketed events, with event names such as "Mahjong After Hours" and "Tiles & Tea". The club hosts monthly mahjong game events, dinner parties, and corporate events. No membership is required to join and play.

Events have a teaching hour, where they teach open-handed game play to facilitate learning the game. More experienced players can elect for the ticketed events without a teaching hour.

In the summer of 2024, the Green Tile Social Club hosted a series of events called "Mahjong in the Garden", where games were played in local community gardens and green space. The series returned in 2025 with three events located in The Standard, East Village.

== Reception ==
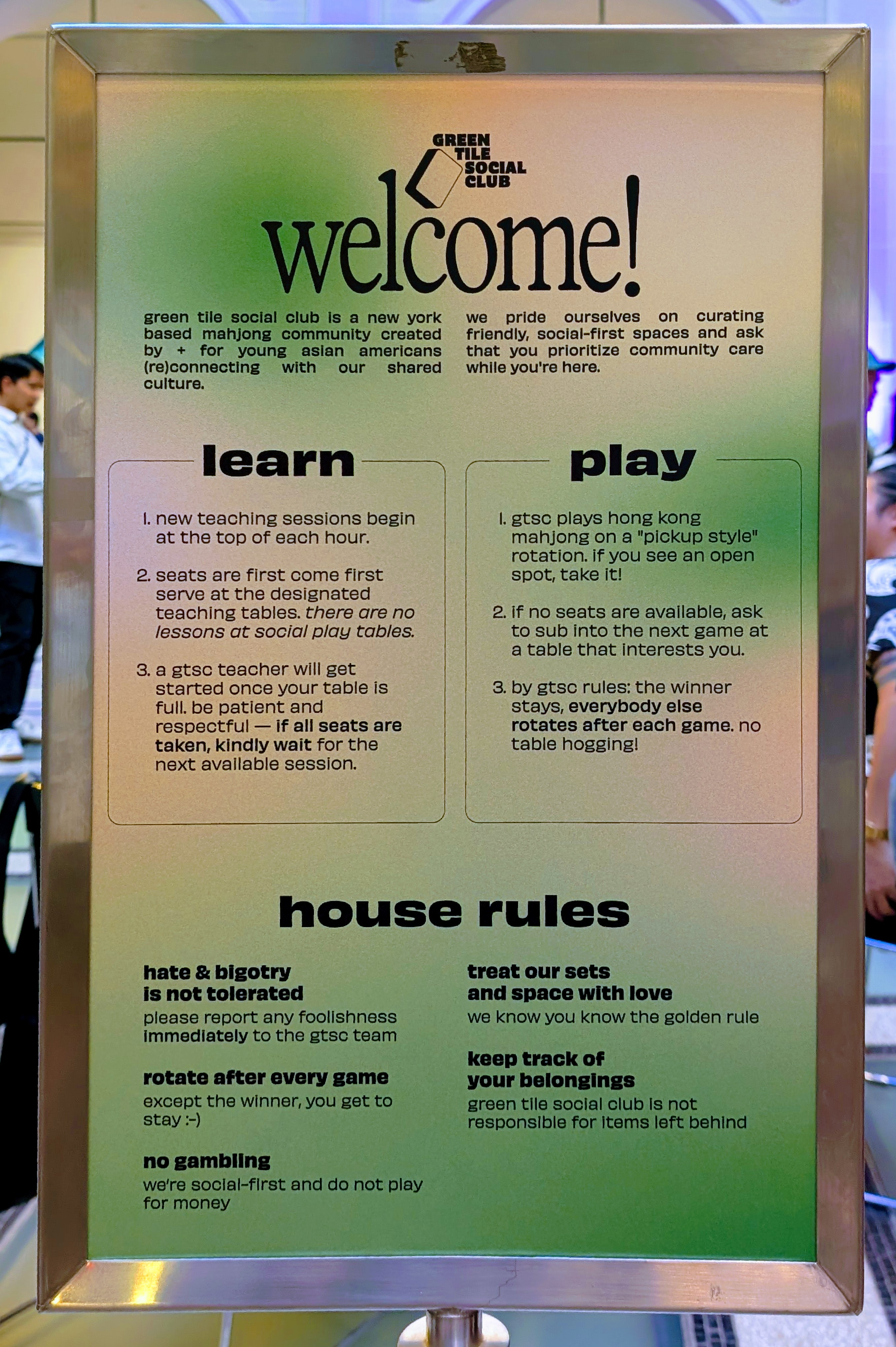
Green Tile Social Club welcome sign and house rules

As of 2024, Green Tile Social Club is one of the largest mahjong clubs in New York City and is a part of a new nightlife trend. Between 100 and 300 people attend the events, with a large proportion of attendees being under 30 years old. In February 2024 for their Lunar New Year party, there were 500 guests. From October 2023 to May 2024, the number of attendees doubled from 4,000 to 8,000. Their January 2025 event was hosted in a warehouse in Brooklyn, drawing in 700 people to play, along with the opportunity to get mahjong tile tattoos and omakase.

Each game brings together four people to a table, where players may end up talking about childhood experiences growing up playing or watching the game being played. One attendee comments on enjoying the game because, "it really brings me back to a lot of memories of my childhood, especially with my grandfather, who is no longer with us. That's something really near and dear to my heart". Another attendee notes, "I always saw my parents playing this game with other people, but I never hopped in, though, because they all speak Chinese. I don’t speak Chinese at all so that was always a barrier [...] Now I kind of understand why [my parents] shouted all this stuff".

The Green Tile Social Club is also part of a trend of increased Asian-themed or Asian American-owned bars, such as Mood Ring, and pop-ups that are supported by the Asian American community and reclaiming their cultural roots.

Saturday Night Live's Bowen Yang has been noted to have attended.

Event attendees often linger, continue conversations after events end, and even help break down event setups, where co-founder Chan comments, "our community [is] also taking care of us".

Green Tile Social Club joins other mahjong clubs, like Los Angeles' Mahjong Mistress, in introducing mahjong to younger generations.

== Influence ==
Due to media coverage of Green Tile Social Club, the founder of the mahjong club Honour Tile Society in Denver, Colorado was inspired to learn mahjong, where their initial potluck and learning session turned into a monthly gathering.

== See also ==
- Mahjong culture
