= Agricultural Bank of China robbery =

2007 bank robbery in Handan, China

- Ren Xiaofeng after his arrest
- Native name: 邯郸农业银行劫案 (Hándān Nóngyè Yínháng Jié àn)
- English name: Handan Agricultural Bank robbery
- Date: October 2006 – April 2007
- Venue: Agricultural Bank of China
- Location: Handan, Hebei, China
- Type: Embezzlement
- Motive: Purchase of lottery tickets
- Perpetrators: Ren Xiaofeng and Ma Xiangjing
- Convicted: Ren, Ma, and three accomplices
- Sentence: Execution by firing squad (Ren, Ma), prison sentences (accomplices)

Between 2006 and 2007, vault managers Ren Xiaofeng (Note: In this Chinese name, the family name is Ren.) and Ma Xiangjing (Note: In this Chinese name, the family name is Ma.) robbed and embezzled nearly 51 million yuan (c. US$6.7 million) from a branch of the Agricultural Bank of China (ABC) in Handan, Hebei, China. The embezzlement and robbery is considered to be the single-largest bank robbery in China's history. Both Ren and Ma were found guilty of embezzling and robbing a state-owned corporation and were sentenced to death in August 2007. Both were executed on 1 April 2008.

== Crime ==
The idea for the heist began when one of the managers, Ren Xiaofeng, stole 200,000 yuan (c. US$26,000) in October 2006 with the complicity of two security guards, Zhao Xuenan (Note: In this Chinese name, the family name is Zhao.) and Zhang Qiang. (Note: In this Chinese name, the family name is Zhang.) Ren then purchased tickets for the Chinese lottery, with the intention of winning a sufficiently large prize that he could return the missing funds before their absence was noted, and still have money left over for himself. Despite the odds, Ren was successful, and he was able to return the 200,000 yuan to the vault.

Emboldened by his initial success, Ren joined forces with another manager, Ma Xiangjing, to perpetrate the same crime on a far larger scale. During March and April 2007, the two stole 32.96 million yuan (c. US$4.3 million), and spent almost the entire amount—31.25 million yuan—on lottery tickets. This time, however, they were unsuccessful, and did not win enough to replace the money they stole. In desperation, they stole six cash boxes containing a further 18 million yuan (c. US$2.3 million) on April 14, spending 14 million yuan in a single day in an effort to recover their losses. Despite Handan reporting record lottery ticket sales, the two recouped only 98,000 yuan (c. US$12,700).

== Investigation and arrests ==
On 16 April 2007, ABC branch managers discovered the missing money and notified the People's Police. With insufficient funds to cover the losses, Ren and Ma used their meager winnings to buy fake identification and flee. This prompted an extensive manhunt with the Public Security Ministry placing the two men on China's most wanted list. Ma was arrested in Beijing on 18 April, while Ren was found a day later in Lianyungang, Jiangsu.

== Aftermath ==
Ren and Ma were charged with embezzlement by the Intermediate people's court, while Zhao and Zhang, the security guards, were charged with misappropriating public funds. A fifth man, Song Changhai, (Note: In this Chinese name, the family name is Song.) was also prosecuted for harbouring Ma while he was on the run. The three accomplices were all given sentences of up to five years in prison, while the two managers were sentenced to death. A landlord, a taxi driver and a car saleswoman in Lianyungang shared a 200,000 yuan reward for assisting police to arrest Ren.

In Handan, five employees of the bank were fired. Only 5.5 million yuan was ever recovered by the police, with the remainder squandered by the perpetrators' gambling.

Both Ren and Ma were executed by firing squad in Hebei province on 1 April 2008.
