= Uniform Invoice =

Type of receipt in Taiwan

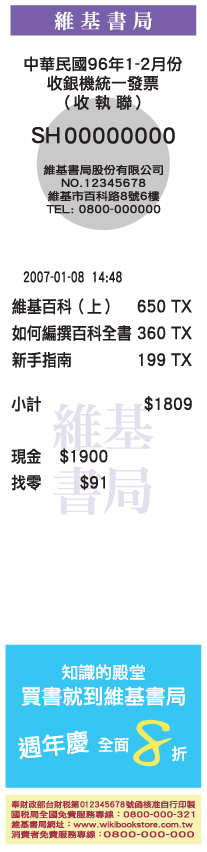
- Exemplar ROC Uniform Invoice (not actual invoice)
- First draw: 1 January 1951
- Operator: Ministry of Finance

The Uniform Invoice or Unified Invoice (統一發票 pinyin: Tǒngyī fāpiào), is a type of standardized receipt in Taiwan that is issued by merchants for selling products and services, kept by both seller and consumer for taxation purposes, which is managed by the Ministry of Finance. It exists in many forms, including printed, electronic and hand-written. Uniform Invoice also features a lottery-like feature. Each invoice come with a code consisting of two alphabet and a 8-digit number, and the lottery is drawn every two months.

== Background ==
"Fapiao" (發票) is a Chinese term that appeared in the mid-to-late Qing Dynasty of China as proof of payment issued by the merchants. During the period of the Republic of China in Mainland China, the Nationalist Government required all merchants involved in transactions to issue invoices, which had to be affixed with a stamp tax to prove that the tax had been paid before becoming effective. However, there were no specific requirements regarding content or formats at the time.

The similar payment invoices used in Taiwan under Japanese rule was referred as "Ryōshūsho" (領収書). After Nationalist Government took control of Taiwan, the transitional period saw the continued use of these Japanese terms. This resulted in a mix of Chinese and Japanese terminology, as well as a blend of old and new era names, and legal status of companies.

== Description ==
The Uniform Invoice and lottery featuring was conceptualized by the first Kuomintang (KMT) finance chief in Taiwan, Jen Hsien-ch'ün (traditional Chinese: 任顯群; simplified Chinese: 任显群; pinyin: Rén Xiǎnqún), to boost tax revenues in the early days of the KMT government. The introduction of this lottery on January 1, 1951, encouraged locals to obtain receipts with standardized formats for every purchase made with businesses with a monthly turnover of NT$200,000 (US$6,200) and above. As a result, the Finance Ministry collected NT$51 million (US$1.6 million) that year, representing a 75% increase from the NT$29 million (US$900,000) collected in 1950.

The lottery drawing in Taiwan is held on the 25th of every odd-numbered month, i.e., January, March, May, July, September and November. Five sets of eight-digit numbers are drawn and announced in a live televised ceremony presented by an emcee, during which four models roll out the winning numbers from hand-turned lottery machines. Several prizes are announced during the ceremony. In 2011, the top Special Prize (特別獎) for the first set of numbers drawn was increased from NT$2 million (US$63,000) to NT$10 million (US$342,000). This is followed by a Grand Prize (特獎) of NT$2 million for the second set of numbers drawn. Then three First Prizes (頭獎) of NT$200,000 (US$6,200) are offered to customers with the receipts matching the 8-digit numbers of the other sets drawn.

Subsequent prizes valued at NT$40,000 (US$1,300), NT$10,000 (US$313), NT$4,000 (US$136), NT$1,000 (US$31) and NT$200 (US$7) are available to receipt holders who match respectively the final 7, 6, 5, 4 and 3 digits on their invoices with any of the sets of numbers drawn. In keeping with Taiwan's convenience store culture, some major convenience store chains will redeem receipts for the smallest (NT$200) prize by allowing customers to buy that amount of products with a winning receipt; larger prizes must be redeemed at a government tax ministry office.

In conjunction with the 60th anniversary of the invoice lottery, the Finance Ministry announced a 33% increase in the total prize value to NT$7 billion (US$20 million) in 2011.

The Ministry started an e-invoice initiative in 2006 with the intention of facilitating e-commerce and reducing the number of receipts that need to be physically printed (currently about 11.5 billion every year). Lee Sush-der of the Ministry of Finance indicated that if 8 billion paper receipts could be replaced with e-invoices, 80,000 trees could be saved. The intermediate goal was to reduce the invoice process cost by NT$7.4 billion by 2013, with an expected total savings of NT$120 billion once comprehensive e-invoicing became the norm. E-receipts set for trial run.

== See also ==
- Gambling in Taiwan
- Economy of Taiwan
- Taxation in Taiwan
