= Chinese gambling workers in the Philippines =

The employment of Chinese citizens in Philippine firms engaging in offshore gambling known as Philippine Offshore Gaming Operators (POGOs) has been a subject of national interest in the Philippines.

== Background ==
An influx of mainland Chinese started during the administration of Philippine President Rodrigo Duterte, who pursued cordial ties with China. Under his tenure, the responsibility of giving license to offshore gambling firms was given to the Philippine Amusement and Gaming Corporation in 2016. This also coincided with the Chinese government ban of all electronic casinos operating in mainland China.

Many POGOs employ Chinese nationals since they speak the same language to the Chinese customers they cater to.

PAGCOR has stated that there are no Chinese-owned POGOs, and all POGO foreign licensees have Filipino partner firms.

While there is no official figure for the number of Chinese gambling workers in the Philippines, it is estimated that around 100,000 to 150,000 Chinese are employed in the Philippines. Those who are accused of illegally working in the country are detained at the Bureau of Immigration Bicutan Detention Center pending their deportation; in one case as many as 281 people at one time.

== Issues ==
The president of the Philippine Association for Chinese Studies acknowledged the proliferation of Chinese-affiliated POGOs to have generated jobs and revenue for the Philippine economy but also fostered tensions between Filipinos and the Chinese, worsened proliferation of prostitution and law enforcement issues.

=== Illegal recruitment ===
In 2019, the Chinese embassy in Manila has expressed concern regarding the large-scale illegal recruitment of Chinese nationals in POGOs describing their plight as "modern slavery". It noted that some Chinese were illegally brought in the Philippines under tourist visas and some had their passports confiscated by their Philippine-based employers and were forced to reside and work in certain places.

=== Integration of Chinese workers ===
Due to complaints of unruly behavior of Chinese workers in the Philippines, PAGCOR has proposed the establishment of self-contained communities or hubs for Chinese gambling workers to limit their interactions with the local population. The Chinese embassy in Manila has expressed concerns that such plan "may infringe on the basic legal rights of the Chinese citizens".

=== National security ===
Filipino security officials have raised concerns regarding Chinese-affiliated POGOs in the Philippines, particularly those near police and military installations. Defense Secretary Delfin Lorenzana has said that POGOs could be used in espionage activities.
