= Hong Kong Gamblers Recovery Centre =

Hong Kong non-profit organization

The Hong Kong Gamblers Recovery Centre (Chinese: 香港戒賭中心) was set up as a Bible-oriented non-profit registered organization in Kwun Tong, Hong Kong in May 2007, pledged to help pathological gamblers and their families. The founder Wu Ping-Chuen had been a taxi driver and had a gambling history of 23 years. Since 1987, he quit the gambling and paid his debts for 10 years. In 2001, he quit his job as a taxi driver and become the gambling counsellor.

== See also ==
- Gambling in Hong Kong
