= Gambling in China =

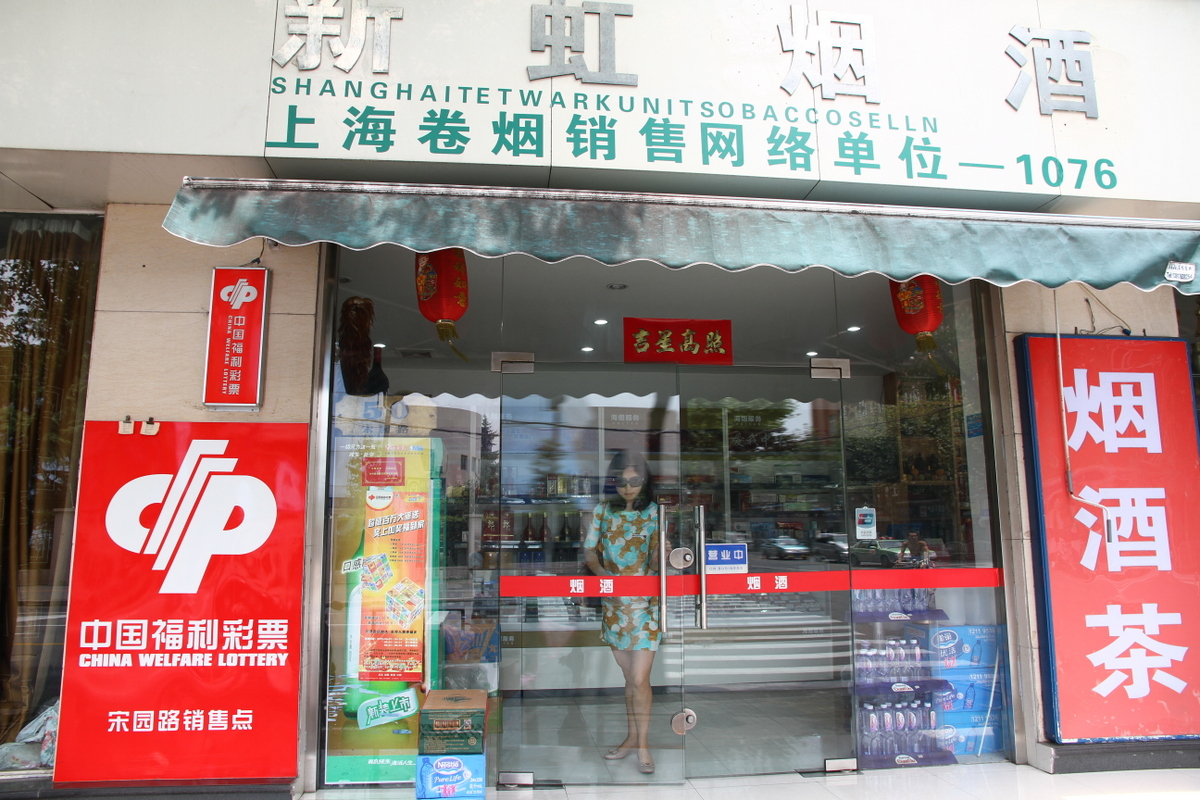
Advertising for China's state-run Welfare Lottery outside a convenience store in Shanghai.

Gambling in the People's Republic of China is illegal under national law and has been officially outlawed since the Chinese Communist Party (CCP) took power in 1949. Any form of gambling by Chinese citizens, including online-gambling, gambling overseas, opening casinos overseas to attract citizens of China as primary customers, is considered illegal. In practice however, Chinese citizens participate in state-run lotteries, regularly travel to legal gambling centers overseas or in the special administrative regions of Hong Kong and Macau, and access gaming through offshore based proxy betting and online gambling companies.

== Mainland China ==
Gambling is generally illegal in China.

Two state-run lotteries exist, the Welfare Lottery (中国福利彩票; Zhōngguó fúlì cǎipiào) and the Sports Lottery (中国体育彩票; Zhōngguó tǐyù cǎipiào), set up in 1987 and 1994, respectively. The Chinese government does not legally consider the lotteries a form of gambling. Illegal gambling in China remains common, including unofficial lotteries, clandestine casinos, and betting in games such as mahjong and various card games. In 2010, The Daily Telegraph reported that an estimated one trillion yuan are wagered in illegal gambling every year in China. Problem gambling exists in the country, and may be more prevalent than in countries with legalized gambling. Online gambling is another outlet for illegal gambling in the country.

In June 2018, the Chinese Government banned all online poker applications. App stores had to remove all poker related applications, and the promotion of poker in general via all social media channels in China (such as WeChat and Weibo) were forbidden.

As authorities intensify efforts to curb such activities, gambling in secluded locations, and mobile gambling setups designed to evade police detection, are increasingly prevalent, particularly in rural regions of provinces like Yunnan, Shanxi, and Anhui.

== Macau ==
Macau is a special administrative region of China and is the only place in China where casino gambling is legal.

Gambling in Macau has been legal since the 1850s, when it was a Portuguese colony. The region has a history of gambling on traditional Chinese games. Gambling in Macau now primarily takes place in Western-style casinos; in 2007, Macau overtook the Las Vegas Strip in gaming revenues. As of 2016, 38 casinos operate in Macau, and the region's annual gambling revenues exceed US$27.9 billion.

On 20 December 2024, CCP general secretary Xi Jinping, while speaking on the occasion of the 25th anniversary of Macau's return from Portuguese to China, encouraged the region to diversify its economy away from casinos.

== Hong Kong ==
While some aspects of mainland Chinese law apply in Hong Kong, certain forms of gambling are legal and regulated in Hong Kong. The Law of Hong Kong is based on English common law, having been a British territory until 1997. Gambling in Hong Kong has been regulated since 1977. The Hong Kong Jockey Club organizes much of the legal betting in the region. Melco Resorts & Entertainment and Galaxy Entertainment Group both operate casinos in neighboring Macau but maintain their corporate headquarters in Hong Kong.

== Offshore gambling ==
The domestic Chinese demand for gambling is significant. Legal restrictions on onshore gambling in mainland China have contributed to the growth of overseas and online gambling sites that cater to Chinese nationals. Integrated gaming resorts in Singapore, Australia, South Korea, Vietnam, Cambodia and the Philippines welcome growing numbers of Chinese tourists. Mongolia, a neighbour of China, is also looking into legalizing gambling and casinos for Chinese tourists.

=== Gambling tourism ===
Several gambling sites previously existed along the China–Laos border and China–Myanmar border to attract Chinese tourists. In Myanmar, Mongla was a site for casinos and other entertainment operations that are illegal in China, as was Boten in Laos. Following patterns of violence against Chinese tourists, the Chinese government pressured Myanmar and Laos to shut down these sites. As of at least 2024, the trend in both Myanmar and Laos is for casinos seeking to attract Chinese tourists to be set up further away from the Chinese border.

=== Proxy betting ===
As in-person visits to offshore gambling venues can be both time-consuming and attract the attention of law enforcement, proxy betting has grown in popularity, especially for VIP clients wishing to discreetly place high stakes bets. In proxy betting, clients communicate with staffers wearing headsets at baccarat tables in offshore casinos. Proxy betting was outlawed in Macau in 2016 and has never been permitted in Australia or Singapore casinos, but now accounts for 40 percent of the $1 billion VIP gaming market in the Philippines, according to brokerage CICC.

=== Online gambling ===
Online gambling in mainland China remains illegal, however, internet traffic routed via VPNs, underground banking networks, and payment platforms enable mainland Chinese customers to access and remit funds to online gaming sites. According to 2019 estimates published in Economic Information Daily, an affiliate of state-owned news agency Xinhua, the annual amount bet through online gambling in the Mainland is more than one trillion yuan (US$145 billion), equivalent to nearly twice the annual income of China's officially sanctioned lotteries.

In October 2014, The Guardian newspaper reported that one major online site, Bet365 had been taking bets from Chinese citizens by using obscure domain names to avoid government web censorship.

In the Philippines, President Rodrigo Duterte in 2016 started the Philippine Offshore Gaming Operations (POGO) program to allow online gambling in major cities. Under POGO, the state-owned Philippine Amusement and Gaming Corporation issued licenses to be used for service providers to offer online gambling. Most of the companies which obtained POGO licenses were Chinese, and their businesses primarily catered to the ethnic Chinese community at-large. Over three years beginning in 2016, at least 100,000 Chinese nationals were estimated to have moved to Manila to work for online gambling operators as marketing agents, tech support specialists and IT engineers to serve Mandarin-speaking clientele. To side step restrictions on direct marketing of online gambling in mainland Chinese print or social media, many online gaming sites seeking to attract Chinese customers have become shirt sponsors for English Premier League football teams. Dafabet's sponsorship of Fulham FC and W88's sponsorship of Wolverhampton Wanderers are just two examples of this trend.

The Chinese government sought to persuade the Philippines to ban online gambling. In the view of the Chinese government, online gaming undermines Chinese financial institutions and creates crime and social problems in China. The Duterte government did not want to restrain the online gaming industry because of the huge revenues it produced for the state, although after an August 2019 meeting between Duterte and Chinese leader Xi Jinping, the Philippines increased its raids on illegal gambling operators. After the election of presidential election of Bongbong Marcos, the Philippines took a harsher stance against online gambling, and in September 2022, the Philippines Department of Justice announced that it would shut down more than 100 online gambling operators and deport approximately 40,000 Chinese nationals working in the online gambling sector.

Before 2020, a significant number of Chinese online gambling operations operated from Cambodia, particularly Sihanoukville. In 2018, Cambodia and China established a joint law enforcement partnership. In 2019, they opened the National Police's Anti-Technology Crime Division joint operations center in Phnom Penh. A day after the center's inauguration, more than 100 Chinese were arrested and deported from Cambodia to China to be prosecuted. Cambodia banned online gambling effective in 2020. Many of the Chinese gambling operators who left Cambodia after the ban did not return to China. Instead, many migrated to Karen State, Myanmar, in the Myanmar-Thai border region where they established gambling operations.

In 2024, the Chinese Ministry of Public Security dismantled more than 4,500 online gambling platforms.

In the 2020s, illicit online gambling operations targeting mainland China increasingly intersected with cyber-fraud and human trafficking compounds in Southeast Asia, particularly within border regions of Myanmar (such as Laukkaing and Myawaddy), Laos, and Cambodia. Operating out of special economic zones and autonomous enclave regions, these networks lured foreign and Chinese nationals with job offers before forcing them to run illegal gaming and telecommunications fraud operations targeting mainland residents.

== History ==
Dice games have historically been a popular form of gambling in China. Among the oldest recorded accounts of gambling date back to 3,000 years ago in China where "keno" was first played to fund the construction of the Great Wall.

Liubo is the earliest gambling game in China, which was reportedly invented by Wu Cau, a minister of Xia Jie. This game was played by 2 or 4 persons. Following this invention, Wu Cao came to be worshipped by the gambling stall owners during Qing Dynasty. The historical records show Liubo was popular among nobles or the upper class society during the Shang Dynasty. During the times of Xia and Shang, the nature of gambling was mainly associated with leisure and entertainment. The wagering elements were slowly added into these games during 700 BCE - 476 BCE as gambling gained popularity among the common people. Other popular games were chess, kickball, pitch-pot, cock- and dog fighting.

Both Confucius and Mencius commented on gambling. While the former saw it as a form of leisure, the latter saw it as one of the five sinful behaviours, as it made people neglect their duties. Scholars of Legalism like Li Kui and Shang Yang strongly opposed gambling.

Under Emperor Qin Shi Huang gambling was prohibited, while for example The General Han Xin is seen as an inventor of football betting. Even though the Han continued to enact the anti-gambling laws in the beginning, nobles and commoners continued gambling. In this period the understanding of gambling also shifted from leisure to a way of becoming rich and during the rule of Emperor Han Wu punishments for gambling were abolished.

Gambling expanded significantly during the Tang dynasty and Song dynasty, coinciding with the growth of urban commercial centers and paper currency. Early forms of playing cards, known as "leaf cards" (yapa), and domino games (Xuanhe Pai) emerged during this period and were widely used for wagering across social classes. Despite occasional imperial decrees attempting to restrict betting on card and dice games, gambling houses flourished in major urban market districts.

Ze Hong argues that during the late Qing and early Republic era there was still not a widespread understanding of the concept of probability among both gamblers and gambling houses. Among the games played he surveys are Fan-Tan, White Pigeon Lottery and Flower Lottery. Instead of taking probability into account gamblers tried to identify patterns, adhered to taboos and interpreted dreams, at the same time gambling houses acted similarly and tried to cheat or decorated their rooms in colors supposed to bring bad luck to the gamblers, instead of trusting their statistical advantages. Also critic of gambling only seldom talks about the unfair chances for gamblers, which in Hong's opinion would have been the case if they would have understood that the chances to win games could be computed.

== See also ==
- 2004 Chinese lottery scandal
- Agricultural Bank of China robbery
- Gambling in Taiwan
