= Mahjong school =

Venue in Hong Kong where adults can play mahjong

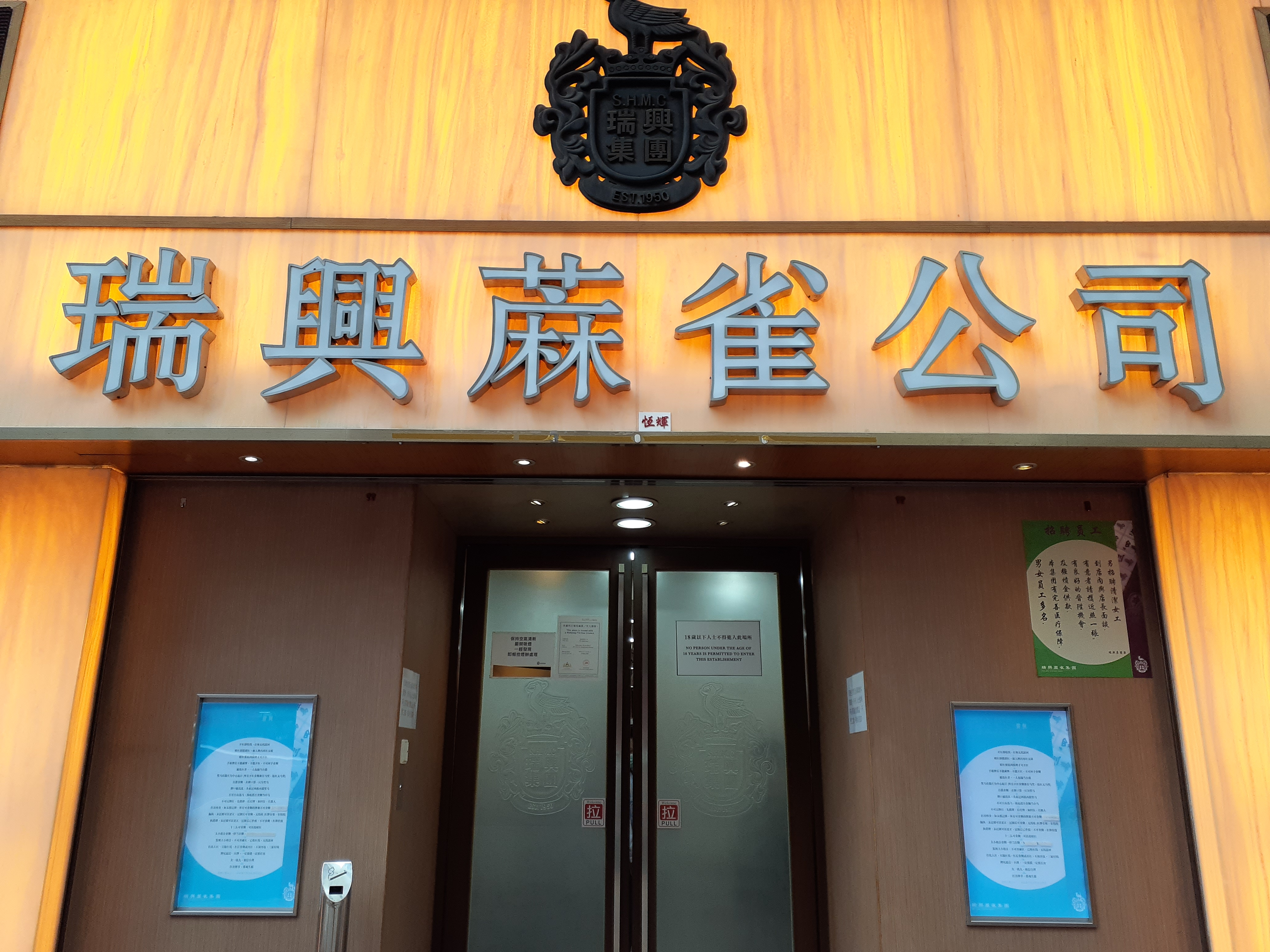
A mahjong school in Yau Ma Tei

A mahjong school is a licensed venue in Hong Kong where people over the age of 18 can play mahjong.

Since 1871, privately run gambling businesses have been banned in Hong Kong; however, mahjong-hosting venues have been tolerated by the Hong Kong government. After World War II, the government has required such venues to obtain Mahjong/Tin Kau Licences with the constraint that such businesses must be known, in Legal English, as Mahjong Schools—a white lie to get around the ban on privately run gambling businesses. Although technically "schools", these Mahjong/Tin Kau Licences are issued by the Television and Entertainment Licensing Authority.

As of 2009, there were licensed mahjong schools in Hong Kong, mostly in densely populated areas, such as Mong Kok, Yau Ma Tei, Wan Chai and Sham Shui Po.

Starting in 2024, at least one of these mahjong schools began offering actual mahjong classes aimed at beginners and tourists.

== Rules ==
If a player plays mahjong in a mahjong school, he has to pay a portion of his gain if he wins a game. This is the main source of income of a mahjong school. To attract players, mahjong schools provide free drinks, free food, and sometimes lucky money. In addition to resident umpires, modern mahjong schools also have closed-circuit television installed to deter cheating and theft.

There are only 0 fan hand and 1 fan hand. Higher score hands are counted as 1 fan. Hence the pace of a game is quite fast as the players do not spend as much time building a high-scoring hand.

== See also ==
- Mahjong culture
- Gambling in Hong Kong
