= Patriotic Lottery =

Taiwanese lottery (1950–1987)

The Patriotic Lottery (Chinese: 愛國獎券; pinyin: Àiguó jiǎngquàn; Pe̍h-ōe-jī: Ài-kok Chióng-koàn; Pha̍k-fa-sṳ: Oi-koet Chióng-khèn) was a Taiwanese state-run lottery that was active between 1950 and 1987. It was conceived to fund budget shortfalls after the tumultuous 1940s, with the first drawing of 10,000 tickets held in April 1950 reportedly being released earlier then expected due to the government's need for money. The lottery was successful during its lifetime, with over NT$68 billion in revenue, half of which went into the state's coffers. The lottery tickets have been noted for their art, representing common themes of each decade (such as efforts to retake the mainland in the 1950s, the Chinese Cultural Renaissance in the 1960s, and Confucianism and moral tales in the 1970s). Eventually, the growth of the Taiwanese economy made the prize amounts less attractive, and an illegal game based on the original lottery's winning numbers called "dajiale" (dàjiālè; 'happiness for everyone') emerged in the 1980s and became more popular as it had better odds and fewer people sharing any winnings. The original artist, Liang Youming (梁又銘), was succeeded by Lin Hsing-hsiung (林幸雄) in 1971, who was reportedly kidnapped three times by people who tried to get the winning numbers from him even though he had no knowledge of them. At the peak of dajiale, an estimated 20-30% of the Taiwanese population had participated in the operation. After various societal issues and crimes cropped up due to the game, the government ended the Patriotic lottery despite protests, issuing the last tickets on 17 December 1987. Nevertheless, dajiale continued with other lotteries, such as Hong Kong's Mark Six, through the decade.

== Gallery ==
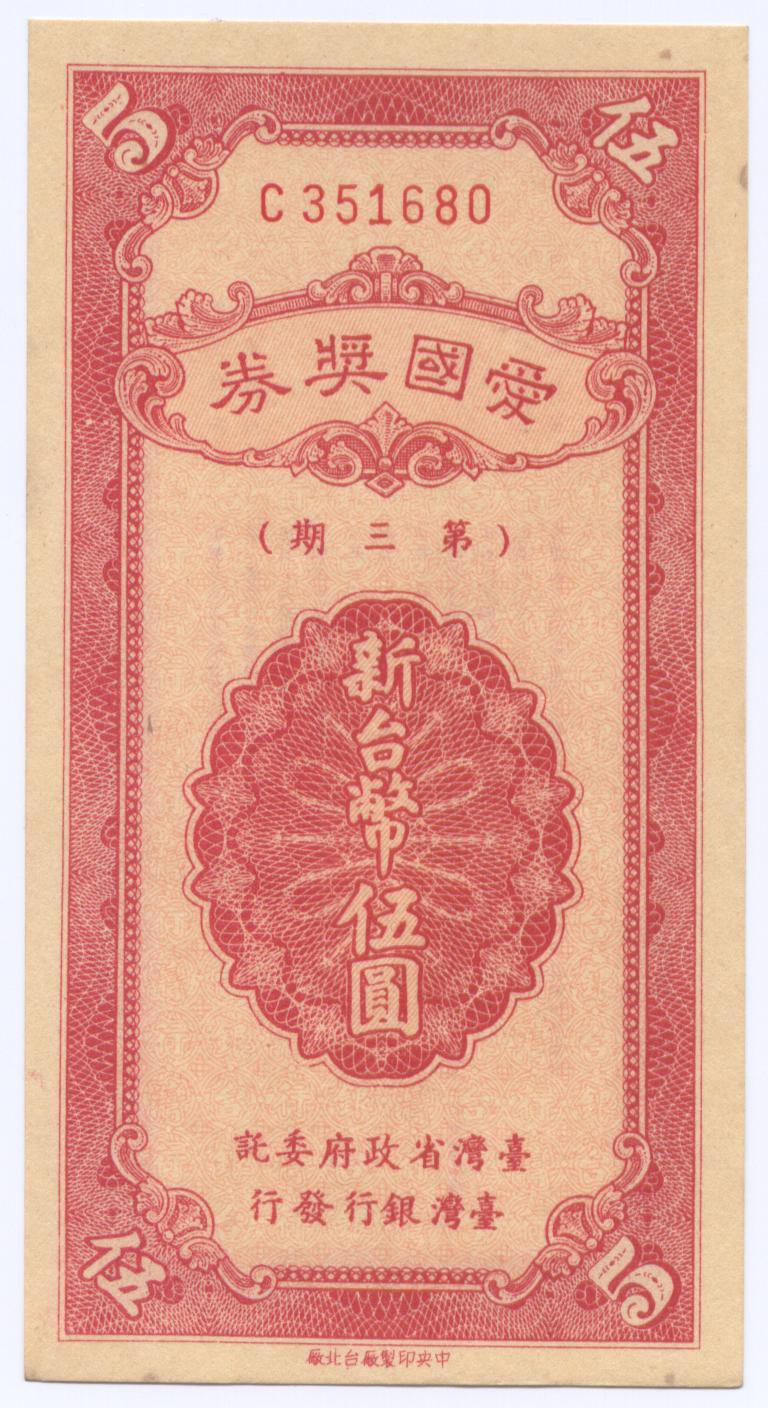
Ticket from the third drawing

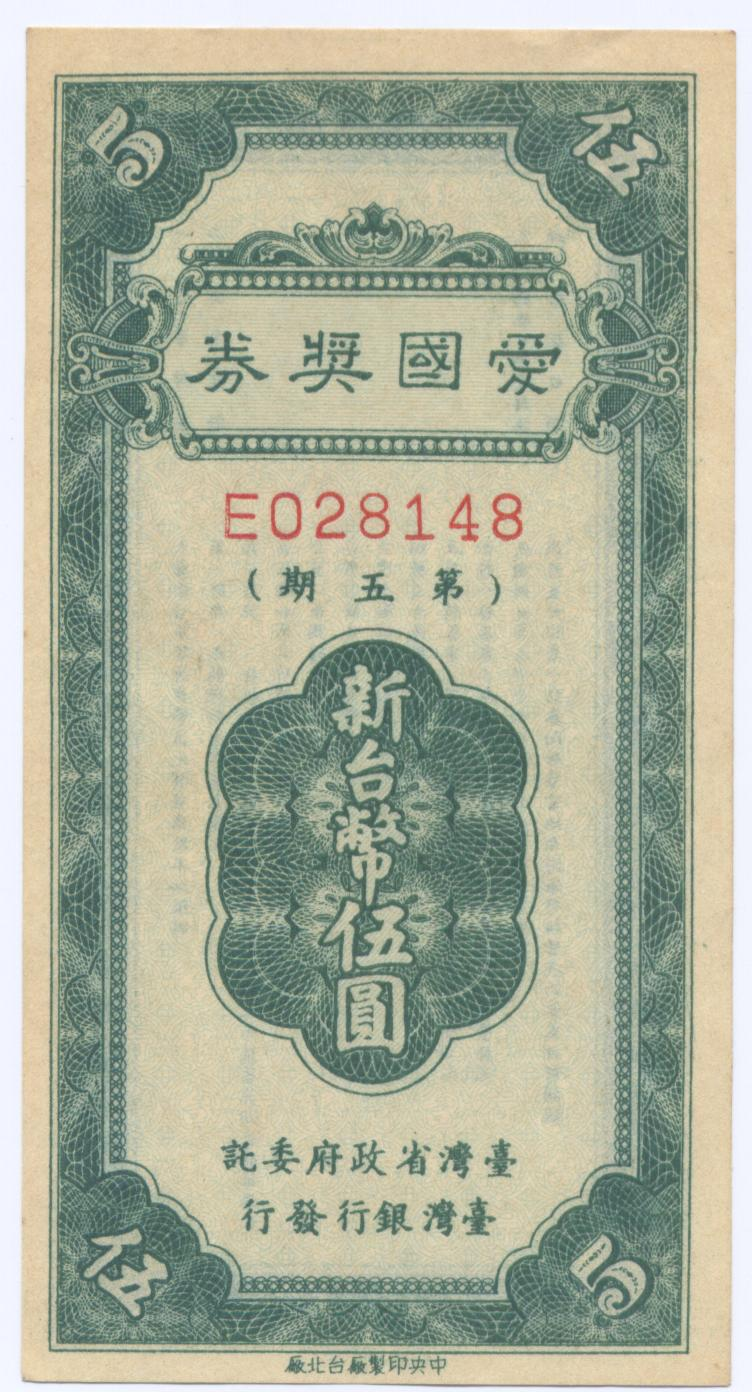
Ticket from the fifth drawing
