= Taxation in Taiwan =

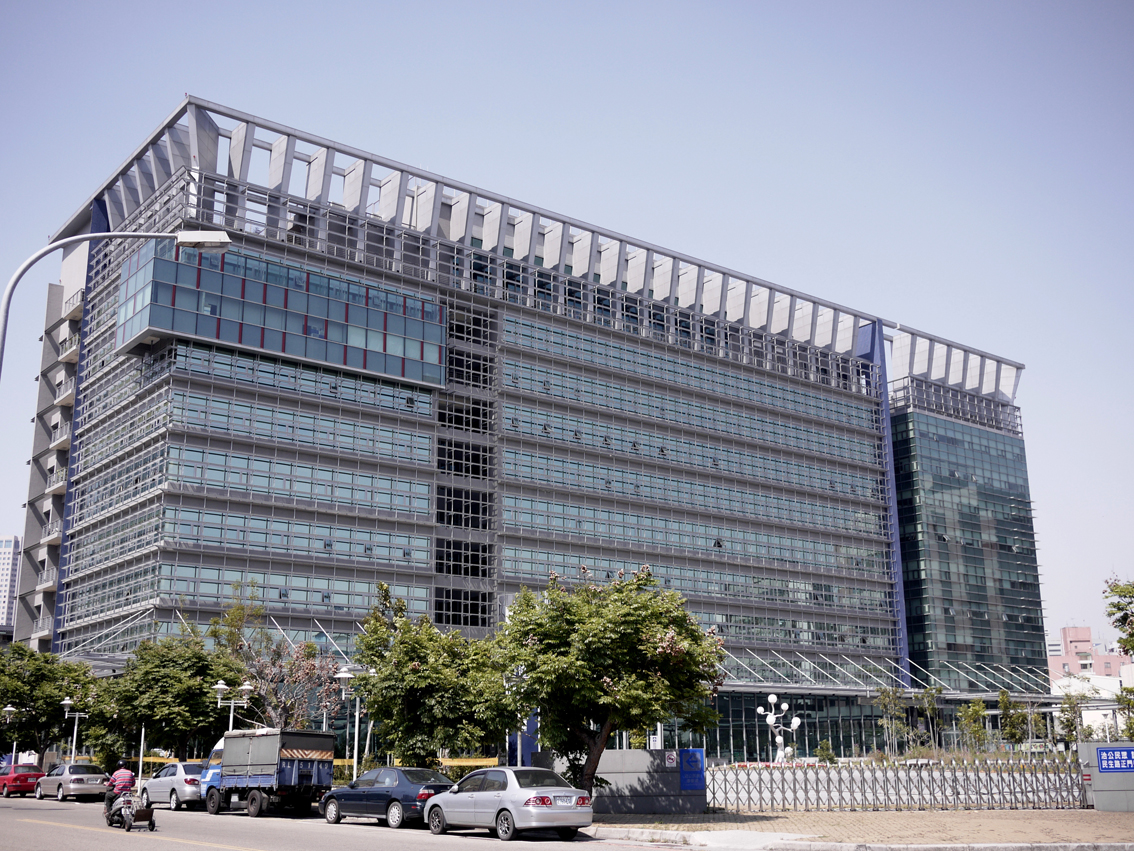
National Taxation Bureau of the Central Area of the Ministry of Finance

Taxes provide an important source of revenue for various levels of the Government of the Republic of China. The tax revenue of Taiwan in 2015 amounted NT$2.1 trillion.

== Tax administration ==
The Ministry of Finance, which is part of the Executive Yuan, is the highest government entity responsible for implementing taxation policies and overseeing the leveling and collection of taxes. Taxation occurs at both the national and local government level.

=== National taxes ===
Two broad categories of taxes exist at the national level: customs duties and inland taxes. Customs duties are administered by the Directorate-General of Customs, which has local offices throughout the country. Five national tax administrations who are directly subordinate to the central government handle oversight of all inland taxes. Inland taxes is a broad term that includes:

- Income Tax;
- Estate and Gift Tax;
- Value-Added and Non-Value-Added Business Tax;
- Tobacco and Alcohol Tax;
- Commodity Tax;
- Securities Transaction Tax; and
- Futures Transaction Tax

=== Local taxes ===
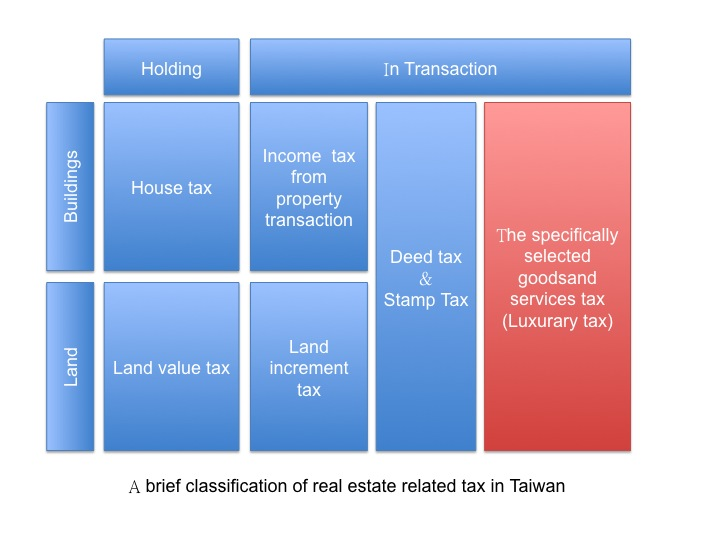
Brief classification of real estate related tax in Taiwan

Individual municipalities, counties, and cities have set up Revenue Service Offices responsible for collecting a range of taxes, including:

- Agricultural Land Tax
- Land Value Tax
- Land Value Increment Tax
- House Tax
- Vehicle License Tax
- Deed Tax
- Stamp Tax
- Amusement Tax

== Tax legislation ==
Unlike the Internal Revenue Code in the United States, there isn't one law that governs taxation in Taiwan. Rather, taxes are governed by a series of laws and regulations each related to a specific type of tax. As the chief legislative body, the Legislative Yuan plays an important role in formulating and revising tax related laws. The Income Tax Act is the primary law that governs individual income and profit-seeking enterprise income taxes.

== Individual income tax ==
Both residents and non-residents are assessed individual income tax on Taiwan-sourced income unless an exception is provided in the Income Tax Act and related laws. Individuals are considered residents of Taiwan for tax purposes if they are either domiciled there, or spend for 183 days or longer in a taxable year.

Income received in exchange for services rendered while physically present in Taiwan is considered to be Taiwan-sourced income regardless of if the payer is a local or offshore person or entity. One major exception to this rule exists for non-residents who are physically present in Taiwan for less than 91 calendar days in a year and who are only paid compensation by offshore entities.

=== Progressive tax ===
Taiwan has implemented a progressive tax system for individual income taxes. For the 2026 tax year, the tax rates are as follows:

Net taxable income (NT$)	Rate	Accumulated payable tax (NT$)
0–610,000	5%	
610,001–1,380,000	12%	30,500
1,380,001–2,770,000	20%	122,900
2,770,001–5,190,000	30%	400,900
5,190,001 and above	40%	1,126,900

The 45% income tax bracket was dropped from the 2018 tax year onwards.

=== Filing of individual income tax ===
By default, the tax year for all individuals and profit-seeking enterprises follows the calendar year. Income tax returns are due by May 31 of the following year, with no extension of time allowed. Taxpayers, including foreigners, are able to complete and file their tax return electronically through software provided by the local taxing authority.

== Profit-Seeking Enterprise Income Tax ==
All profit-seeking businesses in Taiwan are subject to the Profit-Seeking Enterprise Income Tax. Sole proprietors and partners must file a return. However, their portion of the taxable income is reported on their individual income tax return.

=== Income tax rate of profit-seeking enterprises ===
In 2010, the top tax rate was reduced from 25% to 17%, and the threshold below which no tax is owed was raised from NT$50,000 to NT$120,000. Therefore, the current profit-seeking enterprise tax rates are as follows:

Taxable Income	Tax Rate
Below NT$120,000	0%
Above NT$120,000	17%

The amount of tax payable shall not exceed half of the amount of the taxable income in excess of NT$120,000.

== Business tax (value-added tax) ==
Tax amount = (sales - purchases) * tax rate

Value-added tax (VAT) in Taiwan is currently 5% as of 1 June 2023.

== Securities transaction tax ==
This tax is paid by sellers of Republic of China securities at a rate of 0.3% of the gross proceeds from the sale of shares issued by companies. A rate of 0.1% applies on the gross proceeds of corporate bonds, however, an exemption has been put in place through 2016. This tax is governed by the regulations set forth in the Securities Transaction Tax Act.

== Real estate speculation and the luxury tax ==
Aimed at cooling off real estate speculation that was driving up the cost of living in Taipei City and other urban areas, the Republic of China government implemented a new luxury tax in June 2011. The law imposes a 15% sales tax on owners of second homes who sell within one year of purchase. Additionally, a 10% sales tax is charged against properties sold after being owned for between one and two years. Data provided by the Republic of China government in late 2011 showed that the luxury tax was having the desired effect, causing the average housing price in Taipei to fall nearly 12% while reducing overall volume of real estate transactions island-wide by nearly 15% in the June–October time period.

== Uniform invoice lottery ==
First conceived in the 1950s, the Taiwan government created a uniform invoice system to encourage honest reporting of sales and prevent underpayment of taxes by businesspeople. To provide an incentive, the government launched a receipt lottery system. Each receipt is coded with an alphanumeric number, and every two months a lottery drawing is held with prizes ranging up to NT$10 million (approximately $335,000 USD as of February 2012) depending on how many numbers match. The lottery is governed by the Uniform Invoice Award Regulations.

== Historical tax revenue statistics ==
	2010	2009	2008	2007	2006
Gross Tax Revenue	1,565,847	1,483,518	1,710,617	1,685,875	1,556,652
Individual Income Tax	304,686	306,804	389,744	347,526	334,330
Profit-Seeking Enterprise Income Tax	285,701	334,163	445,245	382,634	311,888
Unit: NT$ million
Source: Guide to ROC Taxes 2011

== See also ==
- Ministry of Finance (Taiwan)
