= Philippine offshore gaming operator =

Online gambling service provider

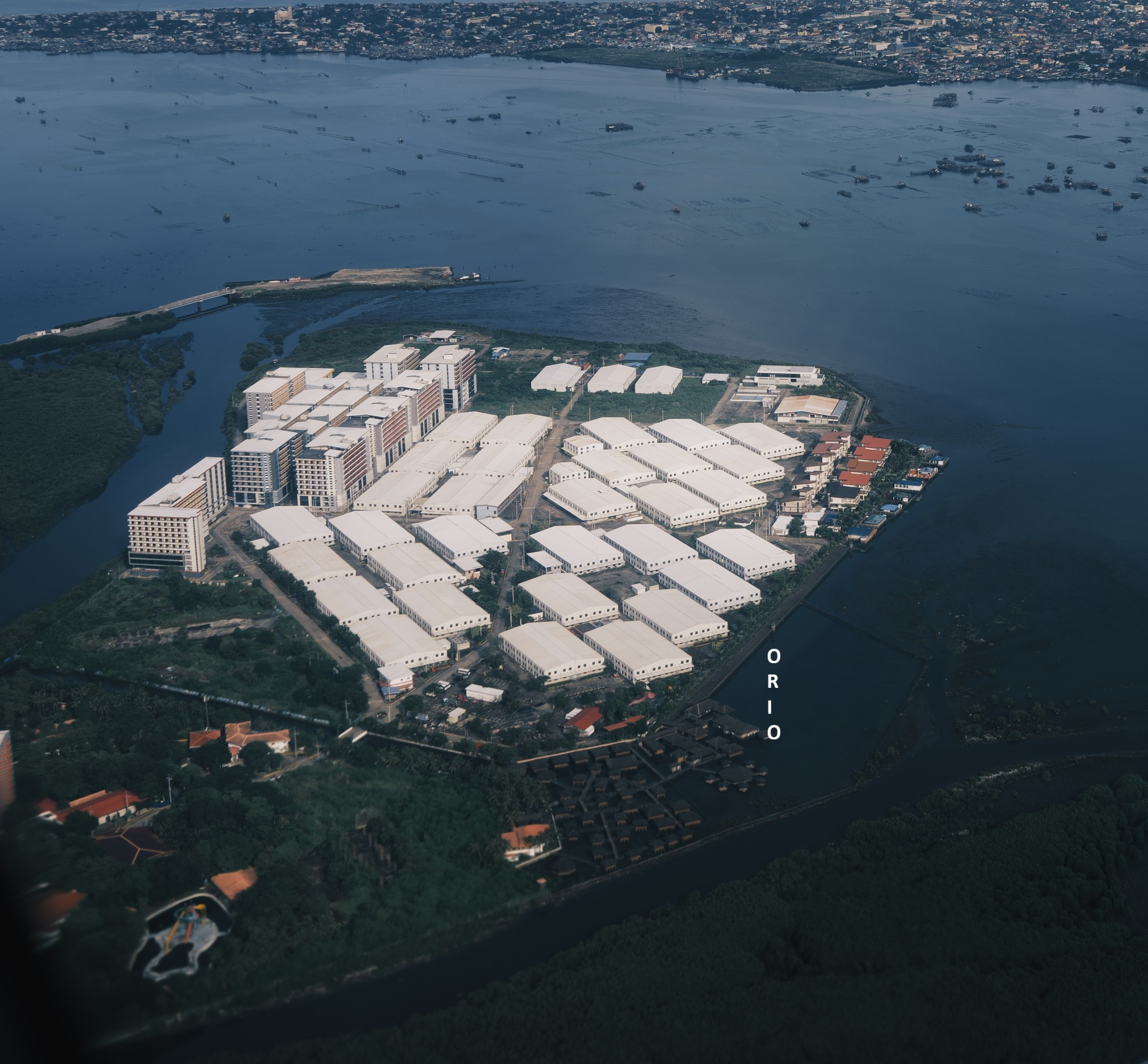
2025 aerial photograph of the Island Cove in Kawit, Cavite.

Philippine offshore gaming operators (POGOs), also known as Internet gaming licensees (IGLs) since October 2023, were firms that operated in the Philippines and offered online gambling services to markets outside the country, with a significant portion catering to the Chinese market. POGOs began operating in the Philippines in 2003. In July 2024, during his State of the Nation Address, President Bongbong Marcos announced a total ban on POGOs (IGLs). In November 2024, he signed Executive Order No. 74, which implemented the POGO ban and required all operations to cease by December 31, 2024. However it was not until October 2025 that the ban was codified into law through the Anti-POGO Act.

They have been regulated by the Philippine government since 2016, at the start of Rodrigo Duterte's presidency. During this period, the industry flourished and generated significant revenues for the Philippine government. In 2018, Senator Risa Hontiveros filed a Senate resolution calling for a ban on POGOs due to their alleged tax evasion and other illegal activities. However, by 2021, President Rodrigo Duterte signed a law which instead legalized POGOs, principally authored and sponsored by Senator Pia Cayetano.

In 2024, after a much-televised series of Senate hearings headed by Senators Risa Hontiveros and Sherwin Gatchalian which gave a spotlight on the illegal activities of POGOs in the country, ranging from fake citizenships, murders, torture, illegal detentions, drug use, prostitution, slavery, and money laundering, among many others, POGOs were ultimately banned and declared illegal upon the signing of the Anti-POGO Law championed by senator Risa Hontiveros. The law spearheaded by Hontiveros was signed into law in October 2025 by President Bongbong Marcos.

== Background ==
POGOs are online gambling firms that operate in the Philippines but cater to customers outside the country. To operate legally, they must be licensed by the Philippine Amusement and Gaming Corporation (PAGCOR). They are obliged to restrict any individual in the Philippines, regardless of citizenship, Filipino citizens regardless of location, and potential patrons in countries and territories where offshore gambling is illegal, from availing their services. Failure to do so risks license revocation.

In 2016, PAGCOR started the processing of license applications for POGOs, in an effort to boost its revenue, after it decided not to renew the license of local online gambling firm PhilWeb. There are three license categories. Category 1 involves services that have live streaming, with women online gambling dealers. Category 2 and 3 are sub-sectors of business process outsourcing (BPO), which provide back office support.

However, the IT and Business Process Association of the Philippines (IBPAP), an umbrella industry group of BPOs, do not consider POGOs in general as BPOs. IBPAP's members are registered with either the Philippine Economic Zone Authority or the Board of Investments. POGOs get their license to operate from PAGCOR, a fact the group argues differentiate POGOs from BPOs. Reportedly, legal members of the POGO industry voluntarily started an organization, the Association of Service Providers and POGOs (ASPAP). In 2018, Senator Risa Hontiveros raised the alarm bells in regards to POGO activities in the country, which she found were sources of illegal activities, including tax evasion. She filed a resolution calling for a total ban on POGOs.

In June 2021, the Senate approved a bill principally authored and sponsored by Senator Pia Cayetano, imposing additional taxes on POGOs, effectively legalizing POGO operations in the entire country. The bill, which was supported by 17 senators—Pia Cayetano, Bong Go, Bong Revilla, Imee Marcos, Bato dela Rosa, Joel Villanueva, Manny Pacquiao, Cynthia Villar, Tito Sotto, Migz Zubiri, Sonny Angara, Koko Pimentel, Win Gatchalian, Ralph Recto, Grace Poe, Dick Gordon, and Nancy Binay, was signed into law by President Duterte in September 2021.

In 2024, Senators Risa Hontiveros and Sherwin Gatchalian launched a series of Senate investigation exposing the illegal activities of POGOs in the country. The activities attributed to POGOs ranged from fake citizenships, murders, torture, illegal detentions, drug use, prostitution, slavery, and money laundering, among many others. The investigations also uncovered a high-level espionage network conducted by China against the Philippines, where a mayor, Alice Guo (Guo Hua Ping), was revealed to have a fake Filipino citizenship. It was also revealed that Chinese espionage work intensified in the Philippines beginning in 2016 under the pro-China pivot of former President Rodrigo Duterte. POGOs were ultimately banned and declared illegal upon the enactment of the Anti-POGO Law championed by Senator Risa Hontiveros in October 2025, signed by President Bongbong Marcos.

== Prevalence ==
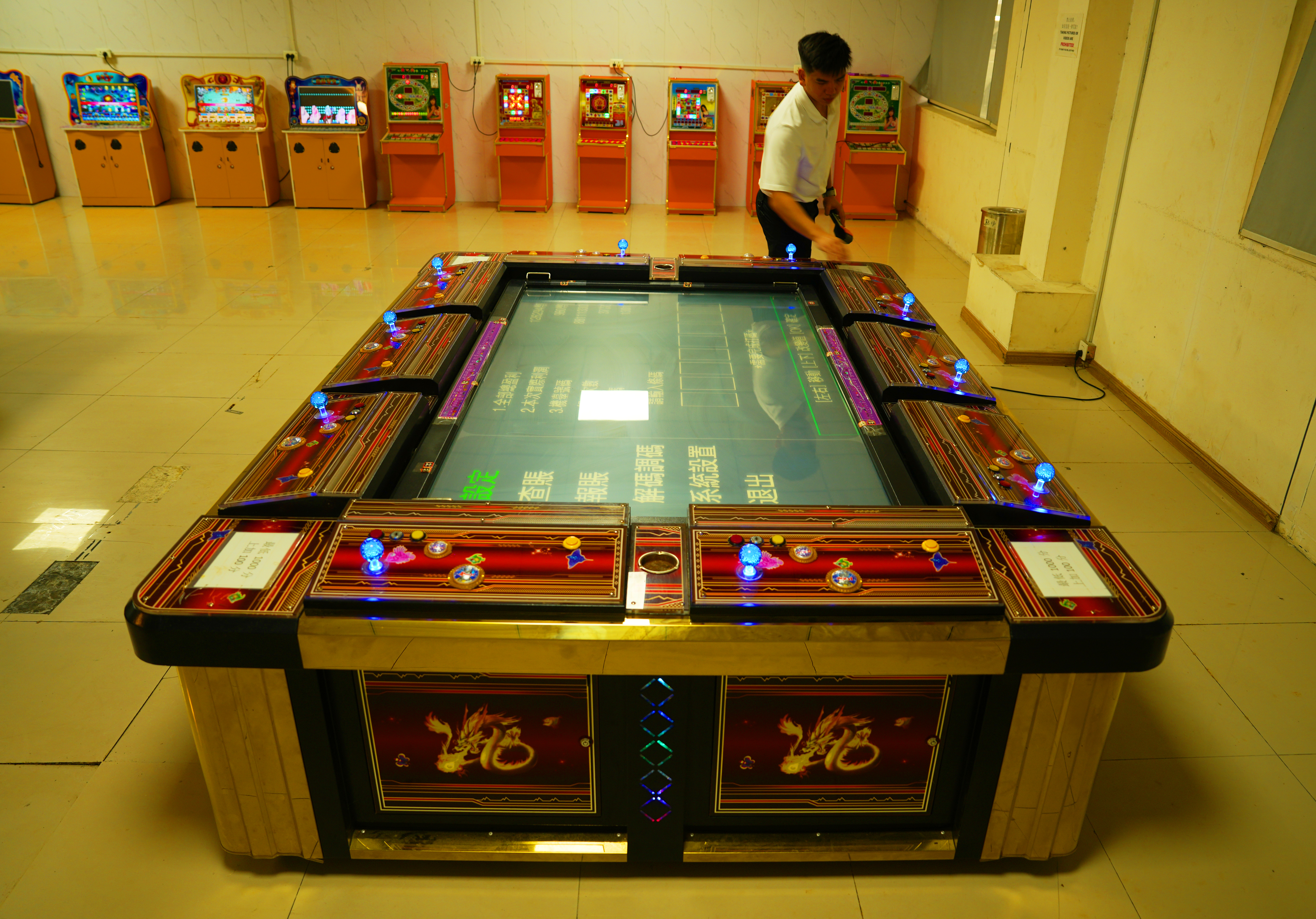
Machines used for online gambling operations

In 2003, POGO firms, mostly Chinese-backed and based in Metro Manila, began operations, and abruptly increased following the start of the presidency of Rodrigo Duterte in 2016. According to PAGCOR, during its peak in 2019, there were almost 300 licensees. By the end of 2023, stricter regulations reduced the number of operating POGOs to about 75. These reportedly further decreased to 54 by third quarter of 2024; they consist of 33 IGLs, 11 accredited providers, and ten business process outsourcing firms.

Since August 2019, PAGCOR has banned licenses for new firms. KMC Savills Inc. projects that POGOs have utilized at least 800,000 square meters (8,600,000 sq ft) of office space. While a significant portion of the Philippine offshore gambling industry cater to the Chinese, some serve the Korean and Vietnamese markets.

In 2019, the industry rented more office space than business process outsourcing, purchasing 386,000 square meters (4,150,000 sq ft) within the first nine months, 34% of total demand. They became the biggest market for new office space in Metro Manila, with 12% of the stock. Annual rents cost $219 million for commercial, $680 million for residential.

Property consultancy firm Leechiu Property Consultants (LPC) reported that POGOs vacated a total of 630,000 square meters (6,800,000 sq ft) of office space from 2020, to the third quarter of 2022. In October 2022, LPC reported that POGOs still occupied 1,000,000 square meters (11,000,000 sq ft) of office space. Their complete exit would result in an estimated ₱18.9 billion in lost annual office rentals. Also, at the same time, ASPAP reported that their members—128 offices in Metro Manila, Clark and Cavite—occupy the total office space of 400,000 square meters (4,300,000 sq ft).

== Impact ==
=== Economy ===
Republic Act No. 11590 signed by President Rodrigo Duterte on September 22, 2021, imposed additional taxes on POGOs.

Since 2015, PAGCOR has been collecting license fees from POGOs, which represent 2% of the Philippines' gross gaming revenue. Revenues from POGOs composed less than 5–6% of the PAGCOR's total income. In addition to license fees, since 2017, the Bureau of Internal Revenue (BIR) collects a 5% franchise tax on local providers, as well as income taxes on workers. Some firms were closed due to an alleged failure to pay. Additional taxes on POGOs were imposed upon issuance of Republic Act No. 11590 (An Act Taxing POGOs) by President Rodrigo Duterte in September 2021.

Department of Finance (DoF) data shows that combined taxes collected from POGOs from 2017 to October 2022 reached ₱53.8 billion: ₱30 billion by PAGCOR, while ₱23.8 billion by the BIR, since 2018.

In 2019, total collected taxes reached ₱14.44 billion. POGO generated ₱7 billion in license fees, according to PAGCOR. National Economic and Development Authority also reported that, at the same year, POGOs contributed ₱104.5 billion—0.67% of the Philippines' gross domestic product. However, revenue from POGOs declined thereafter, especially due to COVID-19 pandemic. By 2023, with decrease of the number of operators, POGO generated ₱5.2 billion in license fees.

In mid-July 2024, DoF reported that the annual net cost of POGO operations is around ₱99.52 billion; while the estimated total economic benefits of the industry reach ₱166.49 billion—an estimated ₱60.68 billion directly. However, it noted a significantly high economic cost, at an estimated ₱265.74 billion annually, which include the effects of negative reputational risks, impacting foreign direct investments.

=== Employment ===
In October 2019, an estimated 470,000 people were employed in the POGO industry, with total annual payroll at $9 billion. These might included more than a hundred thousand Chinese workers. The government had various reports on the number of Chinese working in the Philippines. In early December 2019, figures from the BIR, the Department of Labor and Employment (DOLE), and PAGCOR suggested that the number ranged from at least 44 to 93 thousand. In May 2019, there were 138,000 foreigners employed by POGOs, with 83,760 of them holders of special work permits, allowing them to stay in the country for six months. Only 17 percent of those employed in POGOs are Filipino nationals. Employment decreased significantly during the COVID-19 pandemic.

Reports, mainly by the BIR, showed that there had been a gradual increase of employment rate of Filipinos in the POGO industry—from 14.19% in 2019, reaching more than half in 2021.

Number of workers in licensed POGOs
Date	Filipinos	%	Foreigners	%	Total	Source(s)
Mar. 2020	30,521	25.23%	90,455; Chinese: 69,613; Vietnamese: 3,000± Indonesians: 2,400± The rest were from 46 other countries.	74.77%	120,976	PAGCOR
2020	13,991	33.01%	28,394	66.99%	42,385	BIR
2021	15,745	53.22%	14,838	50.16%	29,583	BIR
Oct. 2022	16,736	48.87%	17,509	51.13%	34,245	BIR
Oct. 2022	19,671	47%	22,184; Chinese: 7,534	53%	41,855	PAGCOR
Oct. 2022	23,118; Direct: 11,776; Indirect: 11,342	n/a	n/a		n/a	ASPAP
2023	25,064	51.17%	22,915	46.79%	48,979	

Prior to the impending closure of POGOs, there are a total of 48,883 workers—58.2% (or 28,462) are locals—by third quarter of 2024, according to PAGCOR. Meanwhile, DOLE said 26,996 Filipinos are employed by 54 companies, mostly in the National Capital Region and Calabarzon; aside from 2,549 indirect workers. Thousands of former POGO workers including from the Philippines have been recruited to run illegal gaming operations in business process outsourcing firms in Sri Lanka with Colombo Port City held out as a new 'paradise' for ex-workers, reports from the island said in 2026.

=== Tourism ===
In 2019, tourism arrivals from China ranked second, at 1.74 million tourists, behind first placed tourist source nation, South Korea. Due to the travel ban imposed by China during the COVID-19 pandemic, in 2021, Chinese visitors to the Philippines decreased to 6,615. At that time, China was enforcing a crackdown on gambling operations on its citizens and launched appeals to the Philippine government to stop POGOs.

== Issues and controversies ==
The POGO industry has been criticized for being a symbol of state-backed Chinese investments in the Philippines. It was perceived that POGOs were promoted by the government at the expense of other industries.

=== Ownership and registration ===
A 2019 Nikkei Asian Review report states that POGO owners are mostly anonymous. At that time, PAGCOR recorded 60 POGOs set up in the Philippines since 2016. Ten were registered in the Philippines, 43 in the British Virgin Islands, and the rest in six other countries, mostly where the identities of owners are kept secret. Only 15 were registered with the BIR, 6 of them pay taxes. 16 were registered with the Securities and Exchange Commission. In late 2019, the Philippine Daily Inquirer reported that the government shut down nearly 200 illegally-operated POGOs that year. District representative Joey Salceda later claimed there were still at least 100. At the time an estimated 70,000 Chinese workers in Metro Manila-based POGOs were reported in 2020, there were estimated to be at least 200 POGOs having no permit. Corruption in the processing of work permits was raised. Meanwhile, illegal hubs in Central Luzon were reportedly dismantled. About 2,000 foreigners were later deported.

=== Effect in Philippines–China relations ===
In 2019, POGO caused a diplomatic clash between the Philippines and China. China expressed its displeasure over its citizens' involvement, who comprise the majority of workers and players, as all forms of gambling is illegal in China (except Macau SAR) while online casinos can only be played by those outside the Philippines. China, among others, warned that POGOs can worsen criminality, specifically money laundering. The government of the People's Republic of China officially rejected POGOs, branding them "most dangerous tumor in modern society", disliked by all people worldwide.

In August 2019, following the Philippine government's move to suspend new POGO applications while addressing all concerns, the Chinese government urged the Philippines to halt local online gambling, requesting the punishment of POGOs illegally employing and mistreating their citizens, and to protect the victims. General Secretary of the Chinese Communist Party Xi Jinping personally repeated the plea, addressing Philippine President Rodrigo Duterte, during their bilateral meeting in Beijing on August 29. In September 2019, at a press briefing at Malacañang, Duterte declined the request, saying that POGO were beneficial for the Philippines' economy, and that many people would lose jobs if POGOs were banned.

=== Employment and residency of foreigners ===
Some locals criticized the influx of Chinese and other foreigners, who were believed to be taking jobs, and limiting the hiring of Filipinos, as evident after raids by immigration authorities on POGO offices. PAGCOR argued for a need for large numbers of native Mandarin speakers to serve mostly Chinese players. In 2020, the government denied that it gave preferential treatment to the Chinese for the industry. In 2019, there were reports that residents in Manila were forced to leave their apartment residences, in favor of Chinese tenants. In 2020, there were reports of medical facilities catering exclusively to POGO workers during the pandemic.

=== Security issues ===
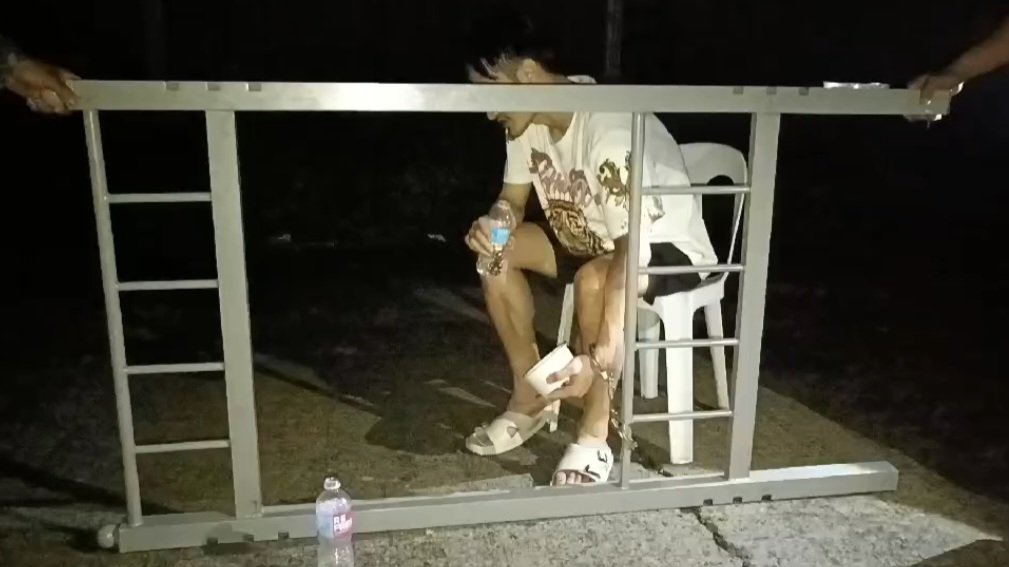
A Chinese national found chained to a bedframe by authorities conducting a raid at the Lucky South 99 POGO hub on June 6, 2024

There were security issues reportedly linked to POGOs, including related criminal activities. Authorities in the Philippines faced issues in dealing with these: POGOs illegally operating overnight, a rise in undocumented workers from China, and a weak response from government agencies. This was contributed further by the "visa upon arrival" program by the tourism department, which made it easier for the Chinese nationals to enter the Philippines, who ended up working for POGOs.

In 2019, watchdog Movement for the Restoration of Peace and Order said that the Philippines was becoming a haven for POGO-related crimes. The watchdog said that illegal workers were packed into condominiums, each unit having up to 40 people, in two or three shifts. Authorities arrested several illegal Chinese workers from raided POGOs, which were eventually deported.

From January 2017 to June 2023, the Philippine National Police recorded a total of 4,355 victims of crimes, with 4,039 in the first half of 2023 alone, and 903 perpetrators. The majority of all individuals involved were Chinese nationals. From November 2019 to March 2023, the National Bureau of Investigation revealed that there were 113 cases, with 65 of them involving human trafficking.

POGO-related crimes
Year	Number	Trial status
2019	9	At least 35 cases have reached court; only one case led to a conviction.
2020	11	At least 35 cases have reached court; only one case led to a conviction.
2021	42	At least 35 cases have reached court; only one case led to a conviction.
2022	40	At least 35 cases have reached court; only one case led to a conviction.
Total	102	At least 35 cases have reached court; only one case led to a conviction.
Note: No any incidents were recorded in 2017 and 2018. Source: Philippine National Police

Incidents reported to the police were kidnap-for-ransom, kidnapping and illegal detention. From 2017 until late 2019, the PNP Anti-kidnapping Group (AKG) reported 67 kidnappings. It was reported that some employees leaving companies were the victims, and policemen were helping the perpetrators, causing rescued victims to refuse cooperation with authorities.

Those POGO facilities had been involved in online scams and human trafficking. In 2023, raids on three separate hubs, in Pampanga, Las Piñas and Pasay, rescued almost five thousand victims. In Pasay, a torture den was discovered, which now serves as the temporary detention facility for future rescued foreigners. At another facility in the city allegedly involved in scams, the police confiscated 28,000 registered SIM cards.

Chinese nationals have been arrested for illegal possession of firearms, for petty crimes, and were reportedly involved in bribery. Prostitution dens were discovered. It was revealed that some gambling syndicates employ Filipino policemen as protectors, as well as paying to corrupt immigration authorities and police.

These prompted PAGCOR to enforce strict regulation. In the last quarter of 2023, these firms were renamed as Internet Gaming Licensees with new rules and regulations for the industry being implemented, as PAGCOR stated that POGO "become too negative."

In October 2023, amid reports of involvement of Chinese citizens in fraudulent activities, China, through a statement from the Chinese Embassy in Manila, called on the Philippines to take strong measures in preventing POGO-related crimes. Following police raids in POGO hubs in Central Luzon in the first half of 2024, the leadership of PNP confirmed the "unreported killings" there. Following President Bongbong Marcos' POGO ban in July, both the Presidential Anti-Organized Crime Commission (PAOCC) and PNP Anti-Cybercrime Group (ACG) reported a significant decrease of text scams. Data from PNP–ACG showed that from twenty in May, there were only two in July.

=== Finance ===
POGO related tax evasion and a minimal contribution to the national economy have been raised. Data from the Anti-Money Laundering Council showed ₱14 billion (26%) of the ₱54 billion worth of transactions from 2017 to 2019 were deemed suspicious. DoF, saying that POGO-related crimes may pose a risk to business and institutions, estimated that the Philippines may risk losing ₱16.7 billion–₱26.2 billion in foreign direct investments.

PAGCOR reportedly failed to collect ₱2.2 billion in unpaid dues from shuttered POGO firms. To avoid further losses to be incurred by the government, in 2023, PAGCOR announced its plan to privatize 45 casinos by the third quarter of 2025, with a revenue target at between ₱60 billion and ₱80 billion.

=== Other issues ===
The security threat posed by POGOs has been raised. In 2020, environmentalists condemned the conversion of a mangrove area into a "POGO island" cluster in Cavite. Even during the lockdown due to the COVID-19 pandemic, PAGCOR actively pushed for the resumption of POGO operations in Metro Manila. The IT and Business Process Association of the Philippines later rejected the claim that POGOs, performing an "essential service", were part of their sector.

In August 2024, Congress investigated Harry Roque's alleged links as a lawyer for a POGO firm in Pampanga. He was cited for contempt and placed under 24-hour detention for lying before the Philippine House Committee on Public Order and Safety. Controversial police officer Jovie Espenido also testified before the House Committee accusing Senator Bong Go of sourcing intelligence funds from POGOs for Rodrigo Duterte's drug war.

== Notable raids ==
=== 2023–2024 Bamban raids ===
The Baofu Land compound in Bamban

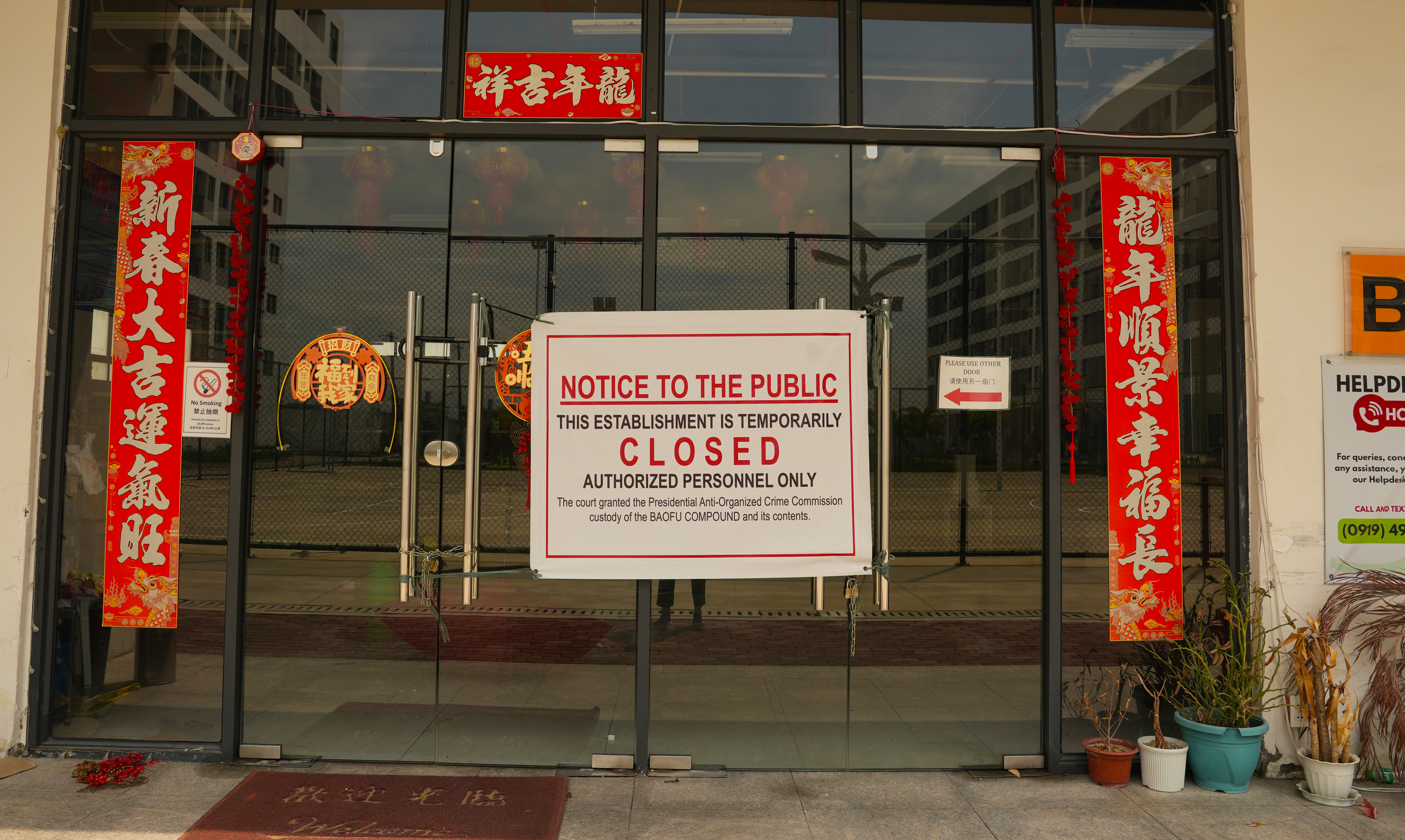
A notice of closure at Baofu Land's POGO hub in Bamban

On February 1, 2023, authorities raided a POGO firm Hongsheng Gaming Technology, Inc., allegedly engaged in a cryptocurrency investment scam, in Bamban, Tarlac, through a warrant issued by the Tarlac City Regional Trial Court (RTC). Up to 851 workers—351 foreigners and 500 Filipinos—were held. Three other officers of the company were at large. On July 7, PAGCOR ordered the company to stop all gaming activities following the raid.

On March 13, 2024, authorities raided the same compound, serving two search warrants issued by the Malolos, Bulacan RTC against Zun Yuan Technology Inc., and rescuing more than 600 workers. (Note: Total number varies: 658, 870, or 875: Filipinos: more likely, 383; in other reports, 371.; Chinese: 202, 427 or 432; Vietnamese: 54 or 57; Malaysians: 8 or 13; Rwandans: 2 or 3; Taiwanese: 1 or 3; Indonesians: 2; Kyrgyz: 1) Various firearms and alleged scamming paraphernalia were seized.

Nine of the rescued Filipinos were considered as witnesses, as there were allegations of physical abuse and torture, as well as illegal activities in the POGO hub, including scams. The foreigners were reportedly staying illegally in the country. Eight of them were charged with human trafficking and serious illegal detention at the Capas RTC.

Aside from offices and dormitories in the POGO compound, further search in the 7.9-hectare (20-acre) complex, which is owned by Baofu Land Development Inc. and located beside the municipal hall, revealed 36 structures including nine villas a swimming pool, underground tunnels connecting the three villas, and 38 to 51 vehicles, and nine carts and heavy equipment. Almost ₱8-million in cash, cryptocurrency-related materials and documents, among other items, were found in 27 vaults. In April, the Palace directed the Anti-Money Laundering Council (AMLC) to freeze and preserve the Zun Yuan compound and its other assets.

In March 2024, Senator Win Gatchalian revealed municipal mayor Alice Guo's alleged links with the firm. Guo, who was elected in 2022, had applied for the license of Hongsheng. In late 2020, the municipal council approved its establishment and operation. In 2022, Hongsheng had its license to operate canceled by the PAGCOR. Following the 2023 raid, the POGO hub was renamed Zun Yuan.

In May, during a Senate inquiry, senators said that the POGO compound housed "mercenaries" allegedly involved in cybercrimes and surveillance activities, citing intelligence reports. Meanwhile, Guo contradicted allegations against her, stating that she was the former landowner of the property, and her vehicle, found within the compound, was sold in 2020. Guo admitted that being one of the incorporators of Baofu, she later sold her shares upon entering politics. As Guo refused to participate further in the Senate investigation, the latter issued an arrest order in July. At that month, Guo allegedly fled the country; and was arrested on September 3 in Tangerang, Banten, Indonesia.

Also in May, the Department of the Interior and Local Government (DILG) filed a complaint before the ombudsman against Guo, vice mayor Leonardo Asuncion, nine former and incumbent municipal councilors, and two other officials, in relation to her issuance of business permit to the POGO firm. The ombudsman later cited the investigation by the DILG which revealed that: Guo still having business interests in Baofu even after assuming her mayoral post; and that the POGO hub still having business permit after the first raid, as well despite their non-compliance with the Fire Code of the Philippines.

On May 31, Ombudsman Samuel Martires placed Guo under 6-month preventive suspension. In an August 12 decision, Martires ordered the dismissal of Guo for grave misconduct, and her perpetual disqualification from public office; while the rest were convicted of conduct prejudicial to the best interest of the service. DILG was ordered to look into the possibility of filing charges against Guo's predecessor Jose Antonio Feliciano. On August 30, charges of 87 counts of money laundering were filed by law enforcement agencies, including AMLC, against Guo and 35 others before the Department of Justice for alleged laundering of over ₱100 million pesos in proceeds from criminal activities occurred in the raided POGO hubs in Central Luzon. On the other hand, the controversy revealed concerns surrounding Guo's nationality, resulting to a quo warranto petition filed before the Manila Regional Trial Court seeking nullification of her election victory, as well as charges of "material representation" in her candidacy, filed before the Commission on Elections.

=== 2024 Porac raid ===
On June 4, 2024, joint operatives of the Criminal Investigation and Detection Group and the PAOCC raided a POGO firm, the Lucky South 99 Outsourcing Inc.'s 5.8-hectare (14-acre) complex, with 46 buildings, and other corporations at Grand Palazzo Royale complex at Porac, near its border with Angeles City. The same day, Malolos Regional Trial Court Branch 14 issued a search warrant for violation of the Anti-Trafficking in Persons Act of 2003. The judge, however, issued a 3-page Order denying the Application, grounded on Rule No. 126 of the Revised Rules of Court, on June 5. On June 7, RTC, San Fernando, Pampanga issued another Warrant. The Supreme Court is investigating the allegations regarding the withdrawal of the first warrant.

Initially, 190 individuals were arrested; 158 Chinese, Vietnamese and Malaysian citizens including 29 Filipinos, were rescued during the service of the warrant. Senator Risa Hontiveros suspects that someone tipped the POGO operators of the law enforcement operation. A criminal investigation was launched on the alleged leak resulting into the "compromised" raid. A PAOCC official noted that "157 foreigners suspected to be POGO workers were caught leaving" before the operatives' wellness check. Only 140 suspects from 1,000 foreign nationals in the POGO buildings were found before the PAOCC team reached the site. Senator Sherwin Gatchalian said Chinese criminal syndicates had intelligence gathering, reaching into the judicial department. Lucky South 99 hired into its operations Dennis Cunanan, who was convicted in 2015 of participation in the Philippine pork barrel scam. Porac Mayor Jing Capil denied allegations of his participation explicitly stating that no mayor's permit was issued to Lucky South for 2024. In September 2022, the POGO firm was previously raided and closed due to unlawful activities, but it continued operations thereafter without permit.

=== 2024 Lapu-Lapu raid ===
On August 31, 2024, authorities, armed with a mission order from the Bureau of Immigration (BI), conducted simultaneous raids in Lapu-Lapu City, after three Indonesians escaped and inform the Indonesian embassy. Meanwhile, in the Tourist Garden Hotel resort which allegedly hosting an illegal POGO hub, several electronic devices used in love and financial scams, as well as cash being part of proceeds from the operation, were confiscated. At least 169 foreign nationals—93 Chinese, 69 Indonesians, six Myanmar, and a Malaysian—which also including a minor, and a Filipino were rescued and later brought to PAOCC office in Manila. It was believed that employees of defunct POGO hubs in Bamban and Porac relocated there.

In September, NBI–Central Visayas filed the complaints against sixteen of the foreigners—13 Chinese, including alleged POGO operator Zhao Shao; two Indonesians; and a Myanmar national—and a Filipino before the DOJ for qualified human trafficking, a violation of RA No. 9208. A Filipino was also charged for being an accessory for taking the passports of 51 Indonesians. Meanwhile, the BI filed a separate complaint of violation of immigration laws against all foreigners. Later, a hotel worker was arrested for trying to smuggle out ₱8 million in cash.

The NBI has been conducting an investigation into possible money laundering. The resort, which has twelve structures, and several vehicles are under preservation by AMLC. The NBI established that the accused, aside from illegal detention, were involved in love scams and cryptocurrency frauds. According to them, more than 40 Indonesians were initially forced by the Chinese to work at a POGO hub in Clark, Angeles City. NBI later found out that they moved to the hotel which was first raided by the police on June 4. With 12 Chinese bosses, workers reportedly transferred their activities to Cebu and to Mandaue cities. Following the rescue of two Indonesians by the police in July from their Chinese boss and his Filipina partner, the operation was immediately transferred separately in Lapu-Lapu City and another place in Mandaue; and finally to Tourist Garden Hotel.

== Legality ==
Three petitions were filed by the Union for National Development and Good Governance Philippines, Anti-Trapo Movement of the Philippines, Inc., and lawyer Jovencio Evangelista, challenging the legality of the rules for POGOs, which had been approved by the PAGCOR in 2016.

The Supreme Court en banc unanimously dismissed the consolidated petitions, citing failure to observe the hierarchy of courts and to meet the requirements for judicial review. The ruling, promulgated on April 25, 2023, was made public in March 2024.

== Bans ==
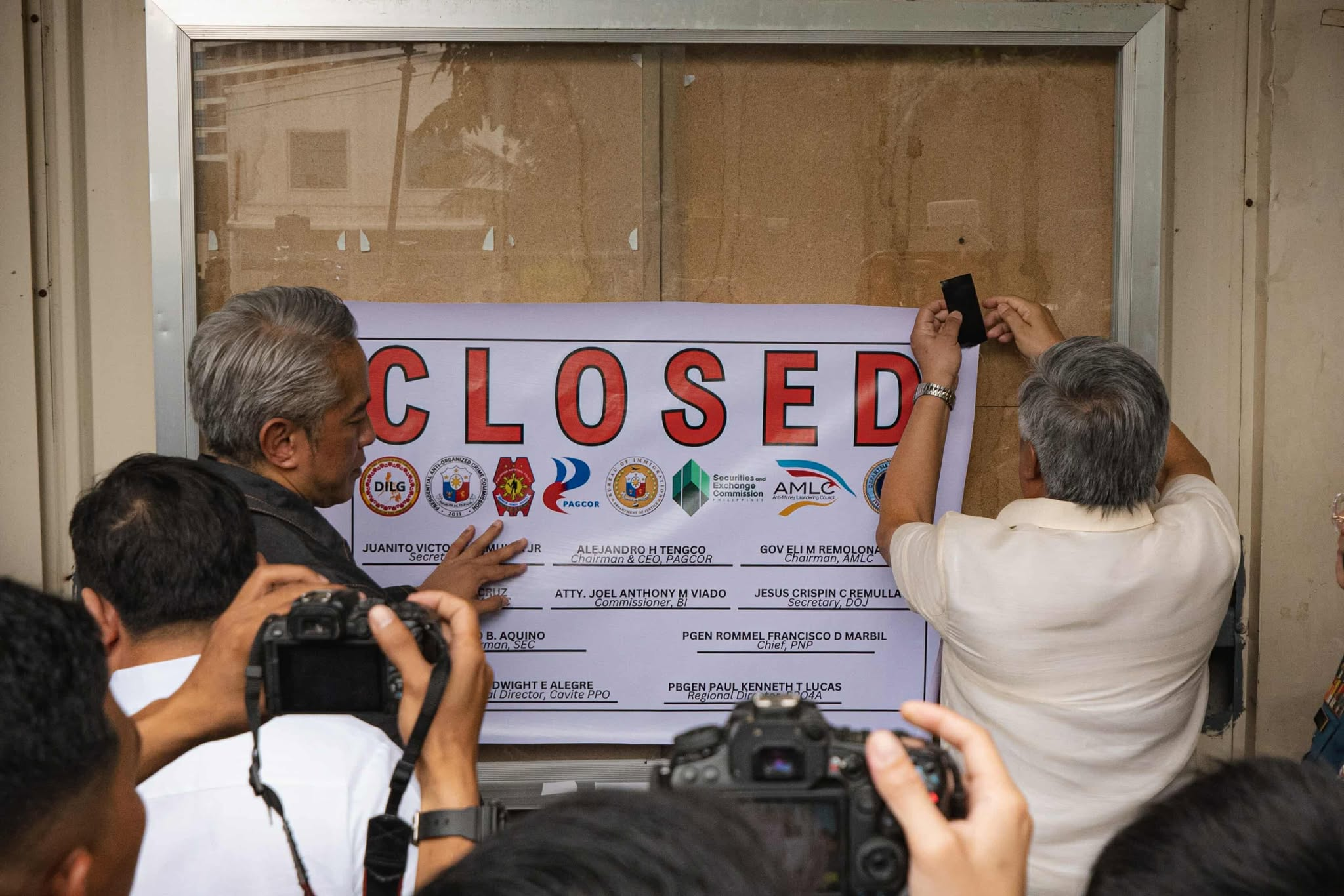
Closure of the POGO hub in Island Cove on December 17, 2024

In 2023, President Marcos said that to outlaw all operations of POGOs, whose surrounding issues are caused by illegal operators, he needed a "good reason". That year, the Senate Committee on Ways and Means filed a report, which proposed the permanent ban of POGOs nationwide to prevent crimes from these companies. Committee chairperson Senator Gatchalian is among the ten signatories.

In 2024, four Senate bills seeking bans were filed. In June, Gatchalian filed a bill aiming to repeal the taxability of POGOs, established under Republic Act No. 11590. Meanwhile, senators Joel Villanueva and Alan Peter Cayetano filed bills for the prohibition of all forms of online gambling. At least three House bills were also filed, in response to POGO-related crimes, and the government's apparent failure to address it. In February, the games and amusements committee approved two measures authored by district representatives Bienvenido Abante and Rufus Rodriguez. Another was filed by Makabayan bloc, led by representative France Castro, in June, paralleling the one in the Senate filed by Gatchalian.

Meanwhile, few local government units have prohibited POGO operation. At least two cities in Metro Manila have enforced a ban, along with other forms of online gambling—Pasig in December 2022; and Valenzuela in mid-2023, yet temporarily for five years. Bulacan, Iloilo City, and Batangas City, followed suit since mid-2024.

On July 22, 2024, President Marcos announced the nationwide ban of POGOs in his State of the Nation Address. On November 5, Executive Order No. 74, immediately banning all POGOs or IGLs and offshore gaming operations nationwide as well as the application and renewal of licenses, was issued by the Malacañang. The closure is scheduled on December 31, with all PAGCOR-issued licenses "deemed canceled" by that date. Some POGO companies expressed intent for the gradual closure of operations. Island Cove in Kawit, Cavite, ceased operations on November 30. In July, the BI gave foreign POGO workers at least 60 days to leave the country. BI later announced the cancellation of the 9G visas (work visa issued to foreign workers in the Philippines) of foreign POGO and IGL employees by November 2. The DOLE cancelled alien employment permits of some workers; while providing jobs for the affected Filipinos.

In February 2025, Philippine police arrested over 450 individuals in a raid of a Chinese POGO scam center. On June 10, 2025, the Senate approved Senate Bill No. 2868 (Anti-POGO Act of 2025; principally authored by Gatchalian) in its final reading. On June 11, the House followed suit with House Bill No. 10987 (Anti-Offshore Gaming Operations Act). Both measures sought to institutionalize the nationwide ban of all offshore gaming activities; and would repeal Republic Act No. 11590. On October 23, 2025, President Marcos signed Republic Act No. 12312, which would likewise declare illegal all POGOs; and will cancel the work permits and visas of all individuals involved. The law punishes the establishment of POGOs, the acceptance of bets, the creation of physical POGO hubs, among others. It also effectively revokes the licenses of POGO hubs; officially disallowing PAGCOR to issue licenses; and orders DOLE with transitioning Filipino workers affected by the ban into new jobs.

== See also ==
- Scam center – Human trafficking and fraud enterprises
- Chinese gambling workers in the Philippines
- Pig butchering scam – Type of investment fraud
