= 2004 Chinese lottery scandal =

In 2004, a scandal occurred in Xi'an, China when lottery prizes were not given to their rightful winners, whose tickets were considered forgeries and prizes awarded to accomplices. It received nationwide news coverage when uncovered, resulting in the arrest of five people and several government officials being removed.

The Shaanxi Provincial Sports Lottery Centre refused to give the winner, a farmer named Liu Liang, his prize claiming that he held a fake lottery ticket. In May, Yang Yongming admitted while in police custody that he colluded with the others to defraud winners.

In June, Liu threatened to jump off a billboard if he wasn't given a BMW 325i worth 480,000 yuan (US$58,000) and cash. The lottery center authorities declared that Liu's ticket was valid, apologized and gave him the car in addition to a 120,000 yuan (US$14,500) cash prize.

In December 2004, eleven people who tried to defraud Chinese lottery winners by having their tickets declared forgeries were sentenced to prison terms of up to 19 years. Yang Yongming was sentenced to 19 years by the Xi'an Intermediate People's Court. Jia Anqing, former director of the sports bureau, was sentenced to 13 years. Zhang Yongmin, a provincial official, was sentenced to seven years. Four more officials and five outsiders were also convicted and received terms ranging from six months to 17 years.

Liu Liang eventually sold his BMW.
