= Santa Rosa de Lima Parish Church =

Roman Catholic church in Laguna, Philippines

Santa Rosa Church
- Santa Rosa de Lima Parish
- Parokya ni Santa Rosa de Lima (Filipino)
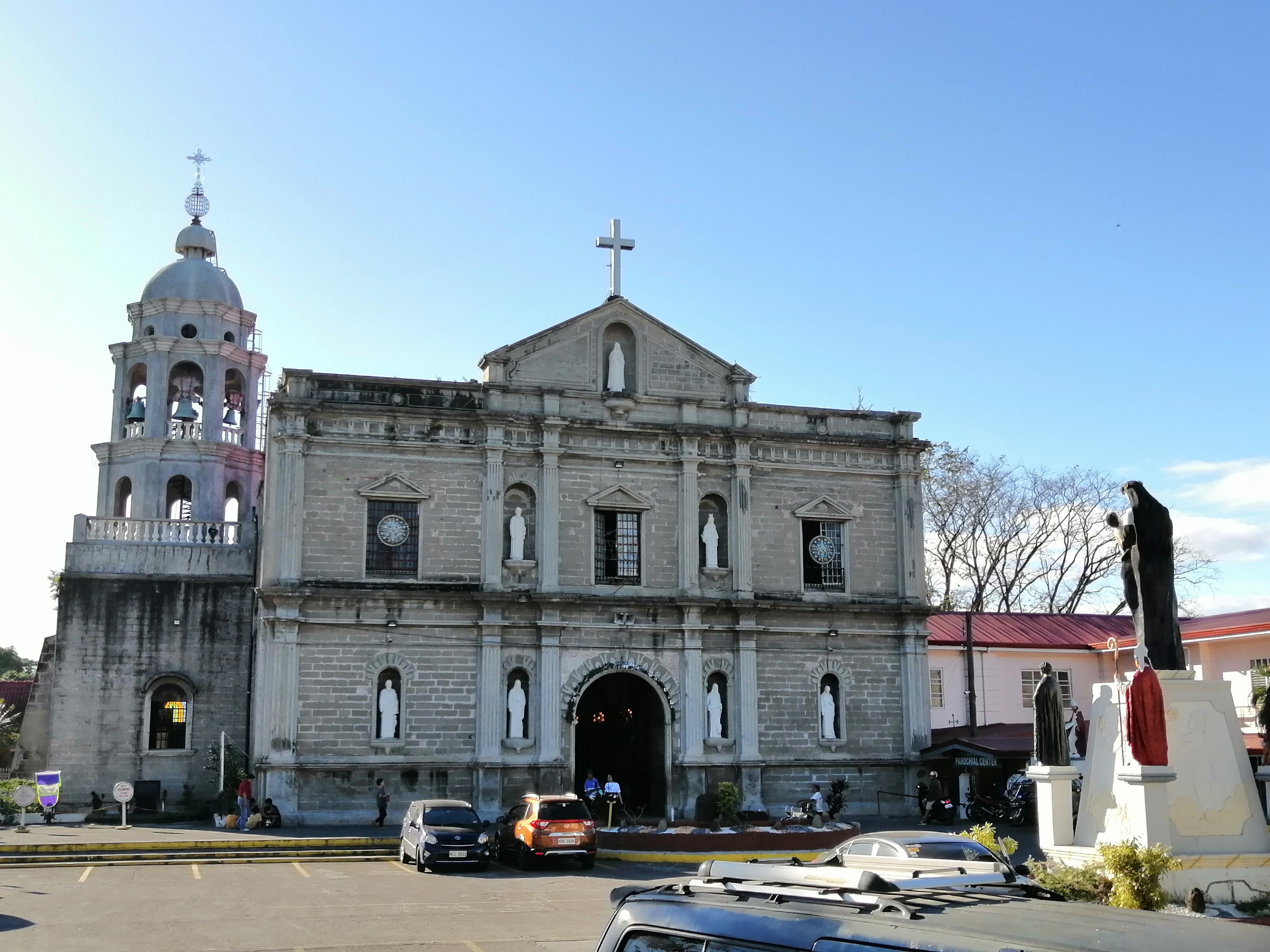
- Church façade in 2020

- Location in Laguna Location in Luzon Location in the Philippines
- 14°18′50″N 121°06′41″E
- Location: F. Gomez Street, Kanluran, Santa Rosa, Laguna
- Country: Philippines
- Denomination: Roman Catholic
- Website: www.facebook.com/ParokyaniSantaRosadeLima/

History
- Status: Parish
- Founded: 1792
- Dedication: Rose of Lima
- Consecrated: August 4, 1812

Architecture
- Functional status: Active
- Architectural type: Church building
- Style: Baroque

Specifications
- Materials: Solid adobe stones with lime and mortar mixed with albumin

Administration
- Metropolis: Manila
- Archdiocese: Manila
- Diocese: San Pablo
- Deanery: Sta. Rosa de Lima

Clergy
- Priest: Mario P. Rivera

The Santa Rosa de Lima Parish is a full-pledged Roman Catholic territorial parish church in Santa Rosa, Laguna, Philippines. Established in 1792, it is the second oldest named parish dedicated to Saint Rose of Lima in the Philippines after Gamu, Isabela. Rev. Fr. Mario P. Rivera serves as the current parish priest. The church is currently under the ecclesiastical jurisdiction of the Roman Catholic Diocese of San Pablo

== History ==
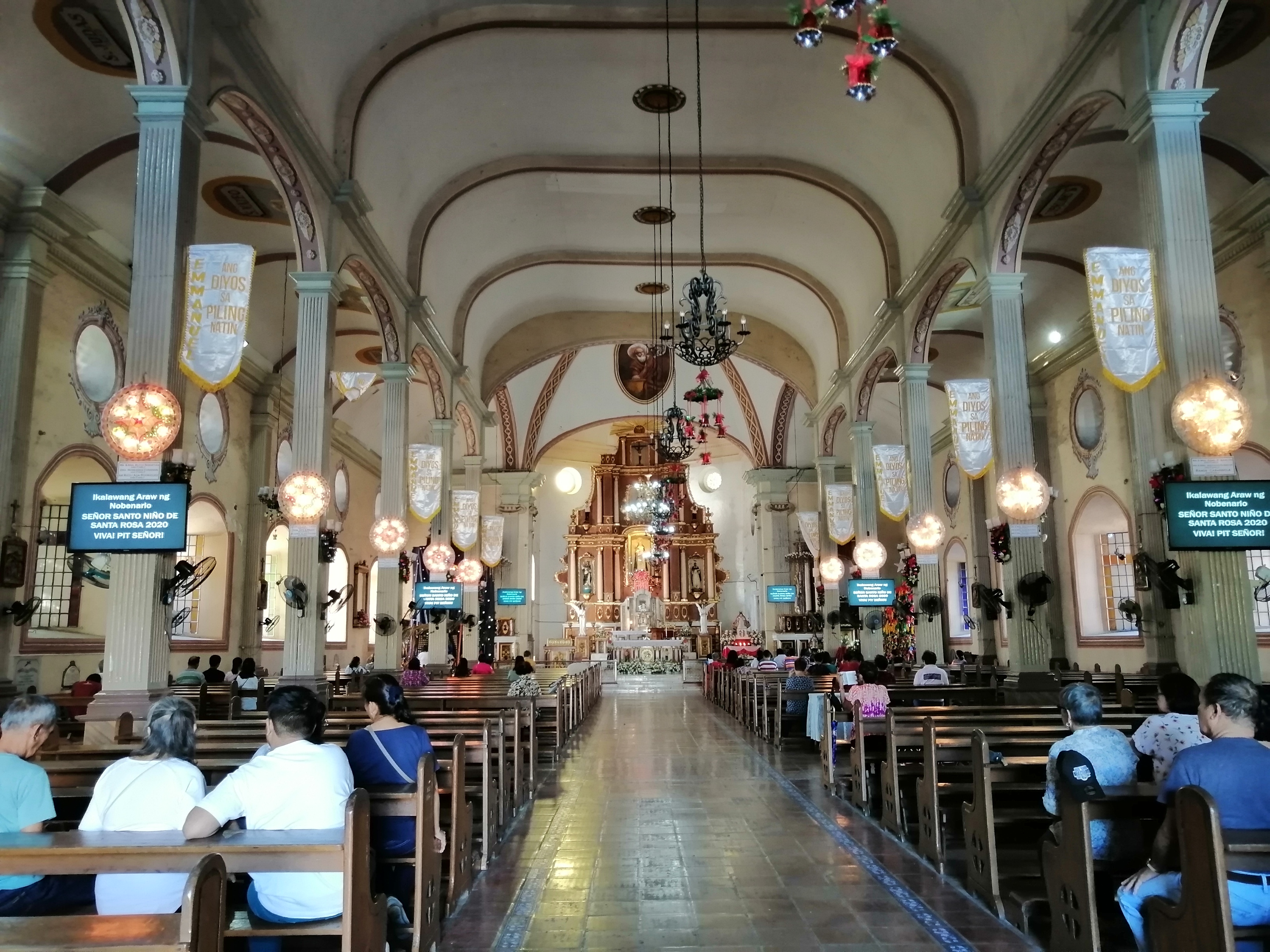
Church interior in 2020

During the earliest days of the Spanish colonial period, the city was once a fragment of the massive agricultural lands owned by the Dominican friars before it became a separate town years after. In June 1571, It became initially part of Tabuco, (what is now known as the modern day city of Cabuyao, Laguna), as part of Barrio Binan. Several years after, Barrio Binan was separated from Tabuco, making it an official independent pueblo or town in 1747. There is a barrio called "Bucol" which was separated from Binan in year 1792 establishing it as an independent municipality (what is now known as the modern day city of Santa Rosa, Laguna). Instead of "Bucol", Dominican friars chose the name "Santa Rosa" in honor of the patron saint, Rose of Lima. The parish was established in 1792 together with the town's foundation with the arrival of its first Parish Priest, Rev. Fray Francisco Favie, O.P., under the Order of Preachers.

In 1796, Dominican friars built the present church structure with the labor of Chinese workers who became ancestors of old Chinese families in Santa Rosa, including the Lijaucos and the Tiongcos. Both the present church structure, where it now stands today, and the convent were completed within 12 years, and the parish was blessed on August 4, 1812. The inaugural Mass, celebrated by Rev Fr. Francisco Favie, O.P. was held on 30 August 1812 in honor of Saint Rose of Lima. The old convent was used as the main building of the old Canossa School.

The original structure remains standing with the facade only retained next to the Old Government Building which is known as Museo de Santa Rosa.

== Features ==
=== Bells ===
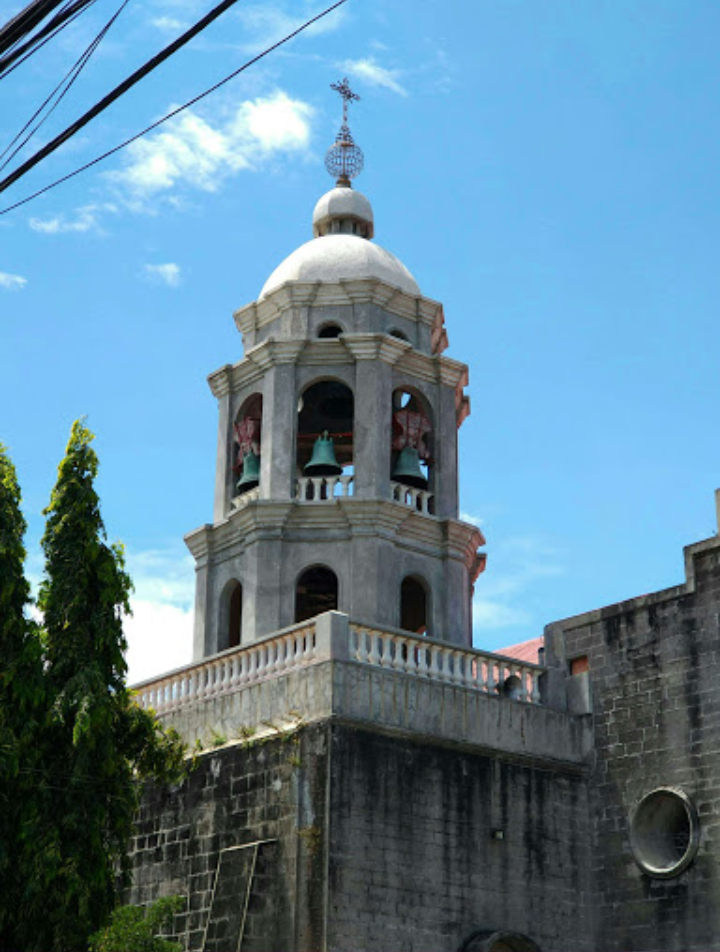
Church bell tower

The church tower contains eight bells ranging from 32 cm to 85 cm in diameter. Each bell bears inscriptions of its patron saint and year of casting.

- Santa Rosa de Lima (the biggest bell)
- Santa Barbara
- Santissimo Sacramento
- San Juan Bautista
- San Jose
- Santa Catalina
- Santo Domingo de Guzman
- Niño Jesus

The patron's name, the name of the manufacturer and his address, the priest then serving as curate, the year of casting, and the name of the donor (if any) are engraved on the bell.

=== Clock of the old façade ===
The church has a clock measuring 1.5 meters (4.9 ft) in diameter that chimes every quarter-hour. It was destroyed during a dogfight between the United States Air Force and the Imperial Japanese air forces, dismantling with it the statues of saints. The display comprised the statues used in the church's Holy Week processions, flanked by two belfries — one on each side.

=== Paintings ===
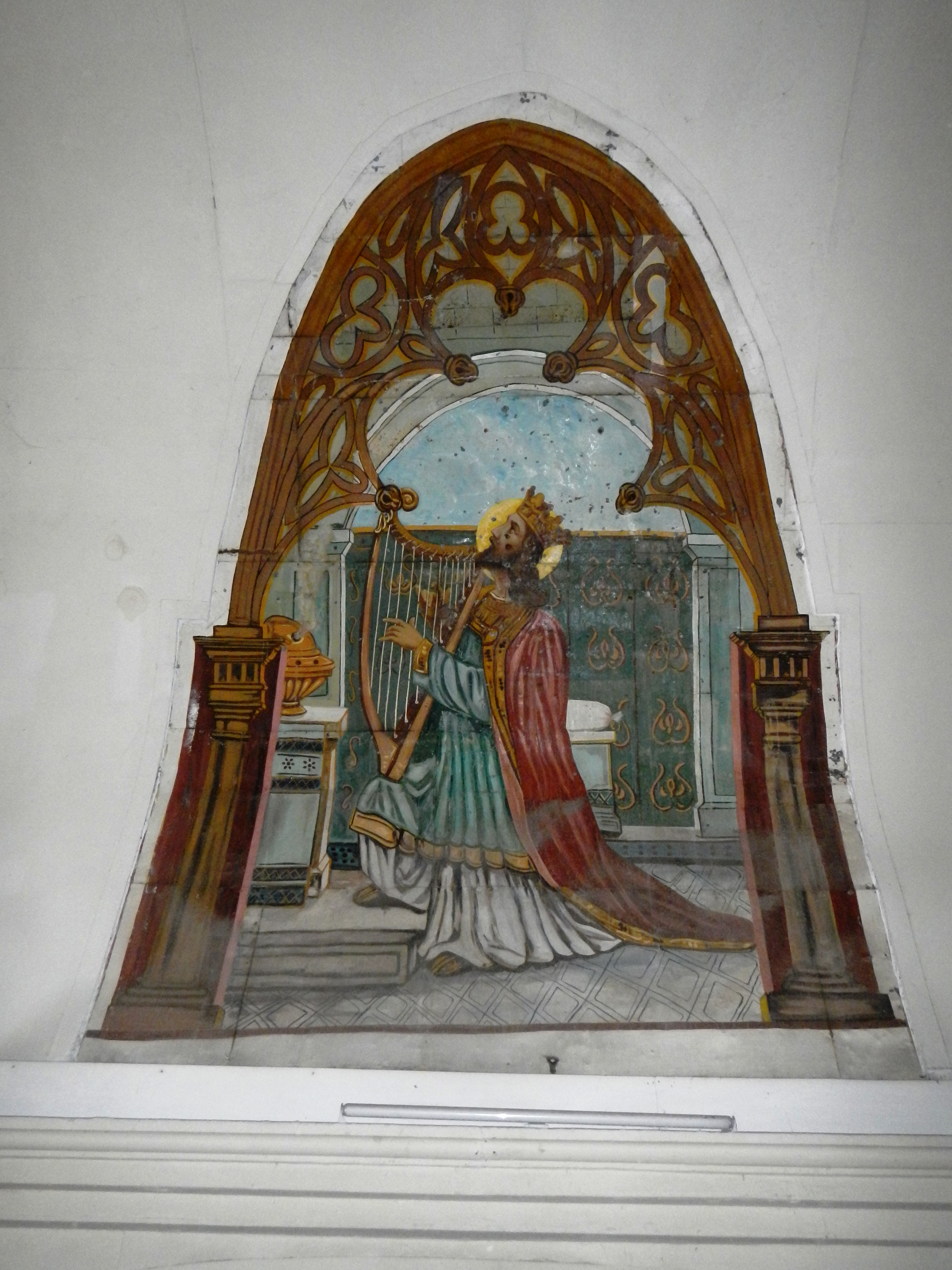
An image of King David on the ceiling of the choir loft

Mariano Perlas Sr., an indigenous Santa Rosa painter in the early 20th century, was inspired to paint the church's ceiling by Andres Tejedor (Oct. 1916 – Feb. 1926), a Spanish priest of the Dominican Order. The paintings were quite popular between 1923 and 1960. Saint Roch, the four evangelists, the Coronation, and the Assumption of the Blessed Virgin were among the paintings.

During Agustin Reyes's tenure from 1957 to 1966, the paintings were removed when the ceiling was repainted during the renovation in 1960. This was necessary because some of the artwork had been damaged by bats or the passage of time. The two remaining paintings on the ceiling of the choir loft, also known as the "Koro," depict the patron saints of Christian music: Holy King David with his harp and Saint Cecilia at the piano. These two are the only ones remaining from over a dozen original paintings.

When Benito Pagsuyuin was the parish priest, some of the paintings that were decaying or fading in the sacristy were assembled, and Pedro Rivera had them repainted. They were framed and displayed at the back of the church.
