= Arlene Arcillas =

Filipino politician and Mayor of Santa Rosa, Laguna

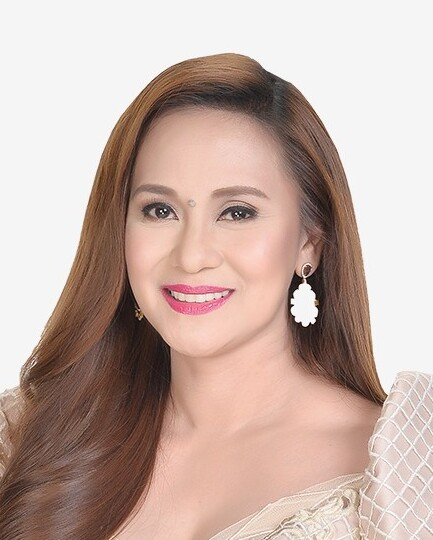
- Official portrait, 2025

Mayor of Santa Rosa, Laguna
- Incumbent
- Assumed office June 30, 2019
- Vice Mayor: Arnel D.C. Gomez (2019–2022); Arnold Arcillas (2022–present)
- Preceded by: Dan Fernandez
- In office June 30, 2007 – June 30, 2016
- Vice Mayor: Manoy Alipon (2007–2010); Arnel D.C. Gomez (2010–2016)
- Preceded by: Joey Catindig
- Succeeded by: Dan Fernandez

Member of the Philippine House of Representatives from Laguna's 1st District
- In office June 30, 2016 – June 30, 2019
- Preceded by: Dan Fernandez
- Succeeded by: Dan Fernandez

Vice Mayor of Santa Rosa, Laguna
- In office May 11, 2005 – June 30, 2007
- Mayor: Joey Catindig
- Preceded by: Joey Catindig
- Succeeded by: Manoy Alipon

Member of the Santa Rosa City Council
- In office June 30, 2004 – May 11, 2005

Personal details
- Born: Arlene Bawan Arcillas; July 31, 1969 (age 56) Santa Rosa, Laguna, Philippines
- Party: Lakas–CMD (2008–2010; 2022–present)
- Other political affiliations: PDP–Laban (2016–2022); Liberal (2010–2016); Lakas–CMD (I) (2003–2008)
- Children: 2
- Education: Canossa School of Santa Rosa, Laguna
- Alma mater: University of the Philippines Los Baños (BS)
- Occupation: Politician

Arlene Bawan Arcillas (born July 31, 1969) is a Filipino politician who is currently the city mayor of Santa Rosa, Laguna since 2019, the position she also previously held from 2007 to 2016. She had also served as the representative from Laguna's 1st district from 2016 to 2019, vice mayor of Santa Rosa from 2005 to 2007, and councilor of the same city from 2005 to 2007.

== Early life and education ==
Arcillas was born on July 31, 1969, to Leon Arcillas, who would later serve as mayor of Santa Rosa from 1998 to 2005, and Josefina Bawan Arcillas. She is the older sibling of Arnold Arcillas, the incumbent vice mayor of Santa Rosa. She completed her primary and secondary educations at Canossa School of Santa Rosa, Laguna. She completed her Bachelor of Science in Biology, major in Ecology, at the University of the Philippines Los Baños in 1992.

== Political career ==
Arcillas, aged 15, was elected Kabataang Barangay Federation President of Santa Rosa in 1984, a move influenced by her father Leon, who was then the vice mayor of Santa Rosa. This position as a sectoral representative earned her a seat in the Sangguniang Bayan (municipal council) of Santa Rosa.

She was later elected city councilor of Santa Rosa, Laguna in 2004, eventually being named as a senior councilor as she had topnotched the election. She was elevated to city vice mayor on May 10, 2005, upon the death of her father Mayor Leon Arcillas, who was assassinated, and the subsequent succession of Vice Mayor Joey Catindig to the mayoralty. She assumed office as acting city mayor on October 10, 2006, upon the suspension of Mayor Catindig. She thus held three positions in one term (2004–2007).

She was elected Mayor of Santa Rosa in 2007, defeating incumbent Mayor Catindig. She was re-elected in 2010 and in 2013. She was awarded in 2011 with the Presidential Lingkod Bayan Award, the highest award given to a government employee and/or official by the Office of the President of the Philippines thru the Civil Service Commission. In 2013, a disqualification case was filed against her by rival Alice Lazaga for allegedly violating the election gun ban.

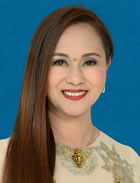
Official portrait of Arcillas in the 17th Congress

She served as representative for Laguna's 1st district for one term from 2016 to 2019, swapping roles with Dan Fernandez as both reached the three-term limit, respectively. As representative, she notably authored House Bill Nos. 8433 & 9080 that sought the eventual creation of the lone legislative district of Santa Rosa.

She was elected as Mayor of Santa Rosa once again in 2019, switching places with Fernandez once again. She was re-elected in 2022 and in 2025.

== Personal life ==
Arcillas was married to a man surnamed Nazareno. She has two children, including Monica, who was the second nominee for ALONA Partylist in 2022.

Political offices
Preceded by Joey Catindig	Vice Mayor of Santa Rosa, Laguna; 2005–2007	Succeeded by Manoy Alipon
Preceded by Joey Catindig	Mayor of Santa Rosa, Laguna; 2007–2016	Succeeded by Dan Fernandez
Preceded by Dan Fernandez	Mayor of Santa Rosa, Laguna; 2019–present	Incumbent
House of Representatives of the Philippines
Preceded by Dan Fernandez	Member of the House of Representatives from Laguna's 1st district 2016–2019	Succeeded by Dan Fernandez
