= Joey Catindig =

Filipino politician (born 1962)

Councilor of Santa Rosa, Laguna
- Incumbent
- Assumed office June 30, 2022
- In office June 30, 1992 – June 30, 1995

Mayor of Santa Rosa, Laguna
- In office May 11, 2005 – June 30, 2007
- Vice Mayor: Arlene Arcillas
- Preceded by: Leon Arcillas
- Succeeded by: Arlene Arcillas

Vice Mayor of Santa Rosa, Laguna
- In office June 30, 2001 – May 10, 2005
- Mayor: Leon Arcillas
- Preceded by: Octavio Ramon Lijauco
- Succeeded by: Arlene Arcillas
- In office June 30, 1995 – June 30, 1998
- Mayor: Roberto Gonzales
- Preceded by: Antonio Dictado
- Succeeded by: Octavio Ramon Lijauco

Barangay Captain of Balibago, Santa Rosa, Laguna
- In office 1991–1992

Barangay Councilor of Balibago, Santa Rosa, Laguna
- In office 1989–1991

Personal details
- Born: Jose Biohon Catindig, Jr. January 13, 1962 (age 64) Santa Rosa, Laguna, Philippines
- Party: Lakas–CMD (2024–present)
- Other political affiliations: Independent (until 2024); PDP–Laban (c. 2013); KAMPI (c. 2005–2007); Liberal (c. 1995–1998); PRP (c. 1992–1995)
- Spouse: Minerva Tamayo
- Education: Adamson University (BA)

Jose Biohon Catindig Jr. (born January 13, 1962), also known as Joey, is a Filipino politician currently serving as councilor of Santa Rosa, Laguna since 2022 and previously from 1992 to 1995. He previously served as mayor of the city from 2005 to 2007, following the assassination of Mayor Leon Arcillas, and vice mayor from 1995 to 1998 and from 2001 to 2005.

== Early life ==
Catindig was born on January 13, 1962, in Balibago, Santa Rosa, Laguna. He is the youngest of nine children of Jose Y. Catindig and Ignacia del Mundo Biojon. He studied primary education at the Balibago Elementary School, finished secondary schooling at the Santa Rosa Educational Institution, and finished tertiary studies at the Adamson University, where he earned a Bachelor of Arts degree in political science.

== Political life ==
=== Barangay politician (1989–1992) ===
He dreamt of entering politics early in his life and by 1989 he ran in the barangay election and became a barangay councilor and later the barangay captain of Balibago, Santa Rosa, Laguna.

=== Municipal Councilor (1992–1995) ===
In 1992, he ran as municipal councilor and won. He served his full term up to 1995.

=== Vice Mayor (1995–1998, 2001–2005) ===
In 1995, Catindig was elected as the vice mayor of Santa Rosa, Laguna. He ran for mayor in 1998 but lost to Leon Arcillas.

Catindig ran for Vice Mayor in 2001 and successfully regained the seat. He was then re-elected in 2004, the year when Santa Rosa became a city on July 10.

=== Mayor (2005–2007) ===
Upon the assassination and death of Leon Arcillas on May 10, 2005, Catindig took over as the mayor of Santa Rosa. On September 15, 2006, Mayor Catindig was suspended by the Office of the President thru the Executive Secretary due to abuse of authority and grave misconduct. However, he returned to office on February 10, 2007. He ran for a full term as mayor at the 2007 Elections but lost, placing second behind the deceased mayor's daughter Arlene, the incumbent vice mayor.

==== Political theme ====
As Mayor, Catindig's primary thrust were education, health, employment and housing. Another concern of his was the heavy traffic flow on the main thoroughfares of Santa Rosa. Although it can not be totally prevented, steps have been taken to ease the flow of vehicles in the city's roads; opening all possible diversion roads and secondary routes, cleaning up the image of the traffic enforcers, instilling discipline, and courtesy, proper and correct training to wit. His call was “Tindig Bayan Sulong Mamamayan” (lit. transl. Rise up town, go citizens).

=== Comeback attempts ===
Catindig ran again for Mayor of Santa Rosa in 2010 as an independent but was unsuccessful, losing to Arlene Arcillas once again. He ran for vice mayor in 2013 as the running mate of Alice Lazaga, who was running under PDP-Laban; they both lost.

=== City Councilor (2022–) ===
Catindig ran for city councilor in 2022 as an independent candidate and won, placing 5th, marking his comeback in public service after 15 years and as councilor after 27 years. He is the only winning councilor not under the ticket of re-elected Mayor Arlene Arcillas to have been elected in the 2022 local elections. He was re-elected in 2025 as the topnotching candidate, this time as a member of Lakas–CMD and under Arcillas's ticket.
