= Santa Rosa Arch =

Monument arch in Laguna, Philippines

- Bantayang Bato
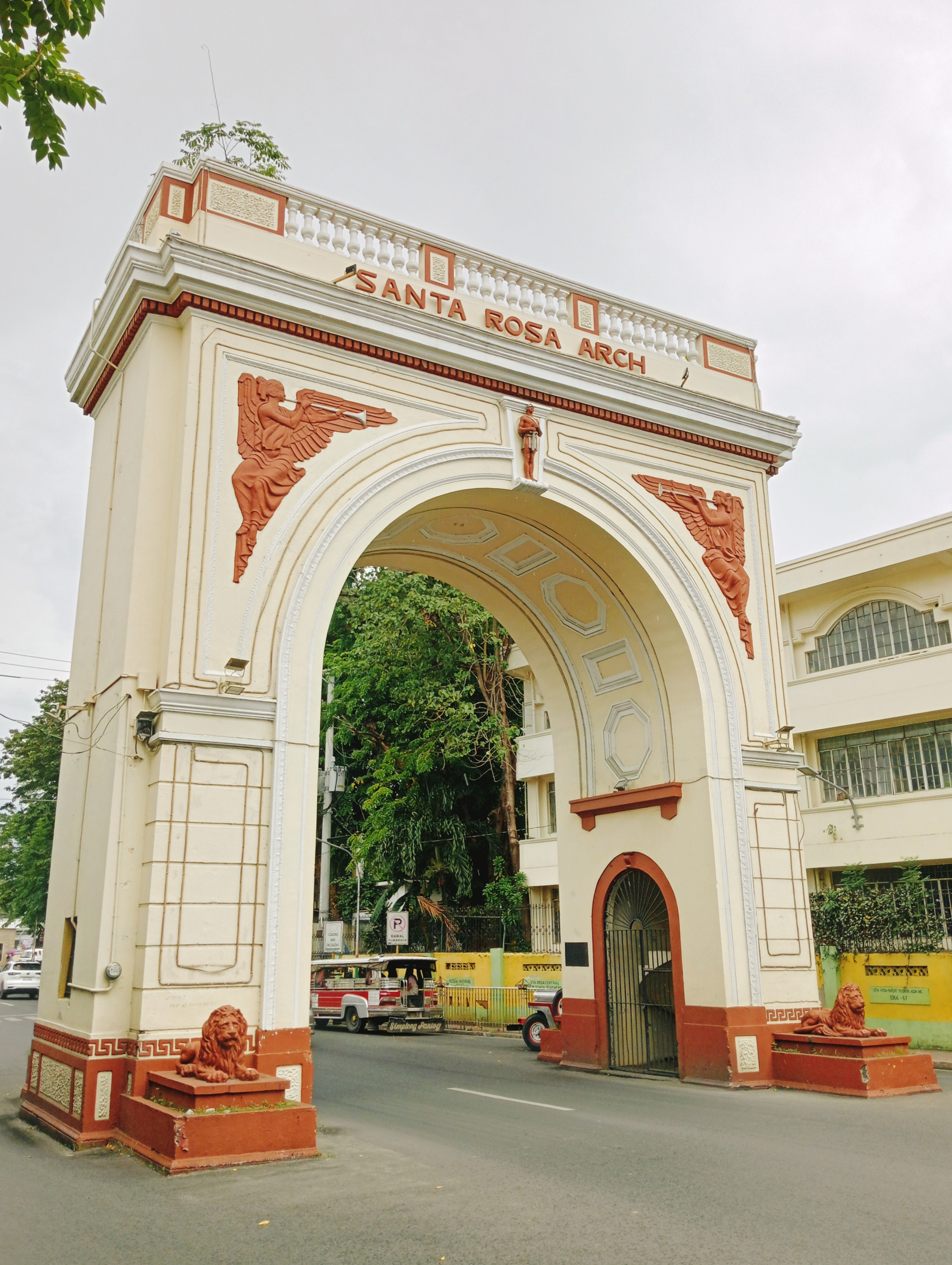
- Santa Rosa Arch in 2024
- Interactive map of the Santa Rosa Arch area

General information
- Type: Triumphal Arch
- Architectural style: Art Deco
- Location: Rizal Boulevard; Santa Rosa, Laguna, Philippines
- Coordinates: 14°18′54.6″N 121°6′41.3″E
- Construction started: 1859
- Completed: 1860
- Relocated: 1925
- Renovated: 1931

Design and construction
- Main contractor: Arcadio Arambulo

Renovating team
- Architect: David Dia

The Santa Rosa Arch, also known as the Bantayang Bato, is a monument in the city of Santa Rosa in Laguna, Philippines.

== History ==
The original structure was built between 1859 and 1860 and was patterned after the Arc de Triomphe in Paris, France. It was commissioned to be built by Arcadio Arámbulo. It was built to replace an old watchtower used by the Spanish colonial authorities to guard the town from bandits, hence its older name of Bantayang Bató (Tagalog, "stone watchtower").

The current structure was erected in 1925 during the tenure of Municipal President José Zavalla. Local sculptor David Día was commissioned to renovate the arch in 1931. The tower above it as well as an external staircase were removed, and the arch has since featured Art Deco characteristics.

== Features ==
The monument features four lion sculptures which are the symbolic guardians of Santa Rosa. These features are the origin of Santa Rosa's nickname, "Lion City of South Luzon". The arch also once had a structured outdoor staircase, a sunburst with face on its alcove, and a lady with flaming torch atop the tower which have since been removed. It currently features a rooftop balustrade. It also exhibits a frieze and bas-reliefs of trumpeting angels in the spandrels.

== Cultural significance ==
The arch is featured on the Santa Rosa city seal

The Santa Rosa Arch is considered as a primary landmark of Santa Rosa serving as a gateway to the city. The monument is also a central element of the city seal of Santa Rosa.
