= Santa Rosa, Laguna =

Component city in Laguna, Philippines

Santa Rosa
- Component city
- City of Santa Rosa
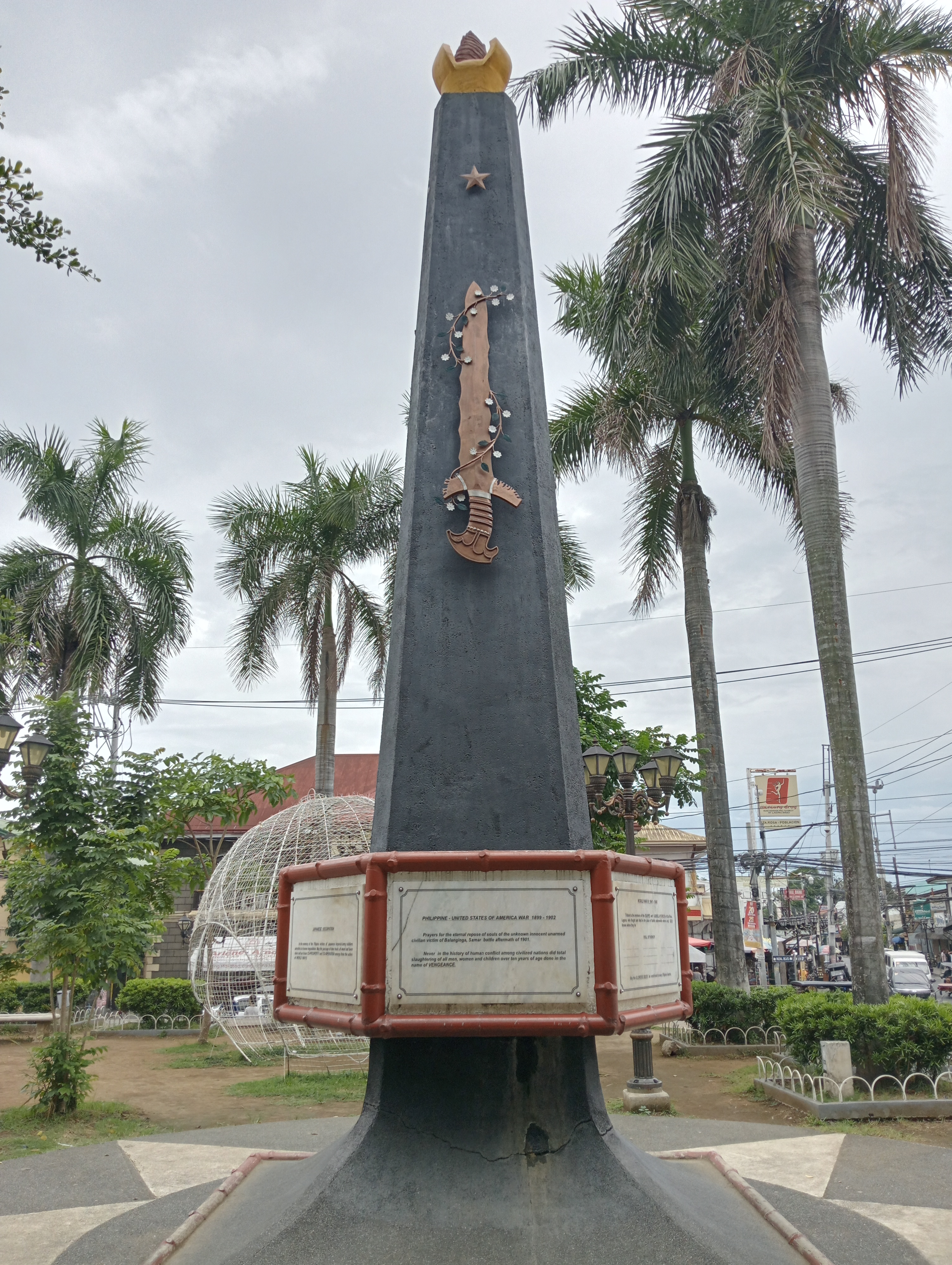
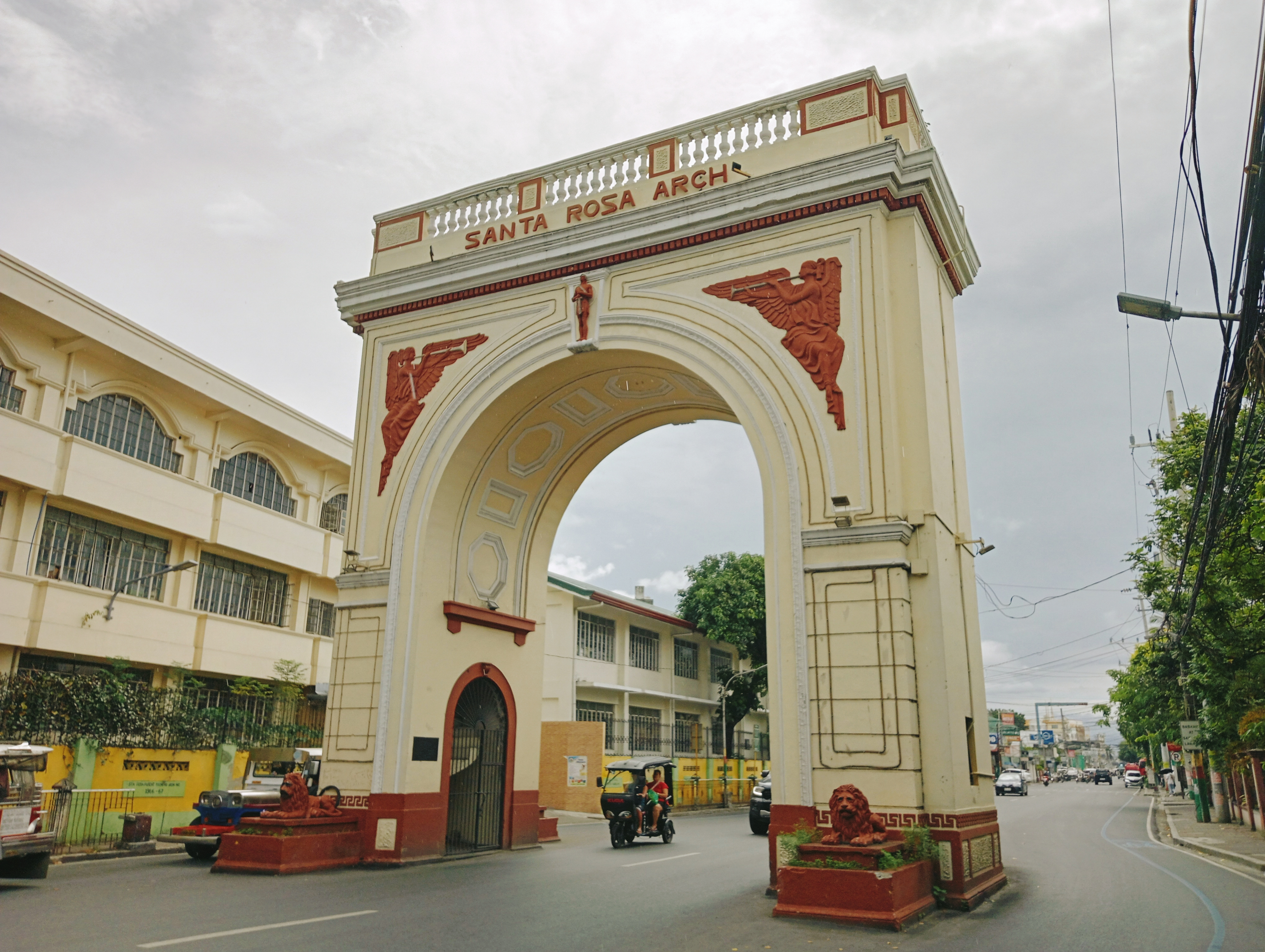
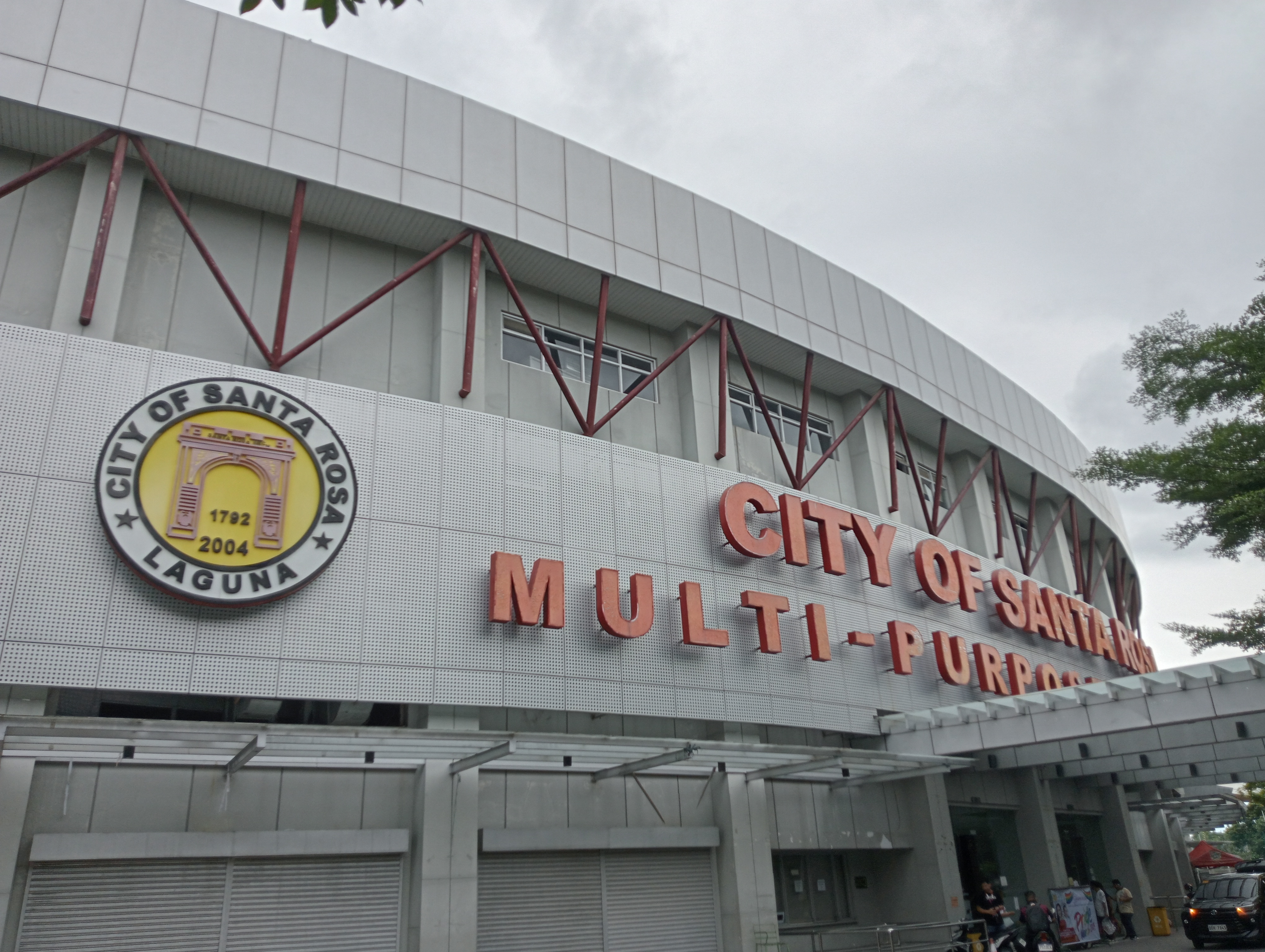
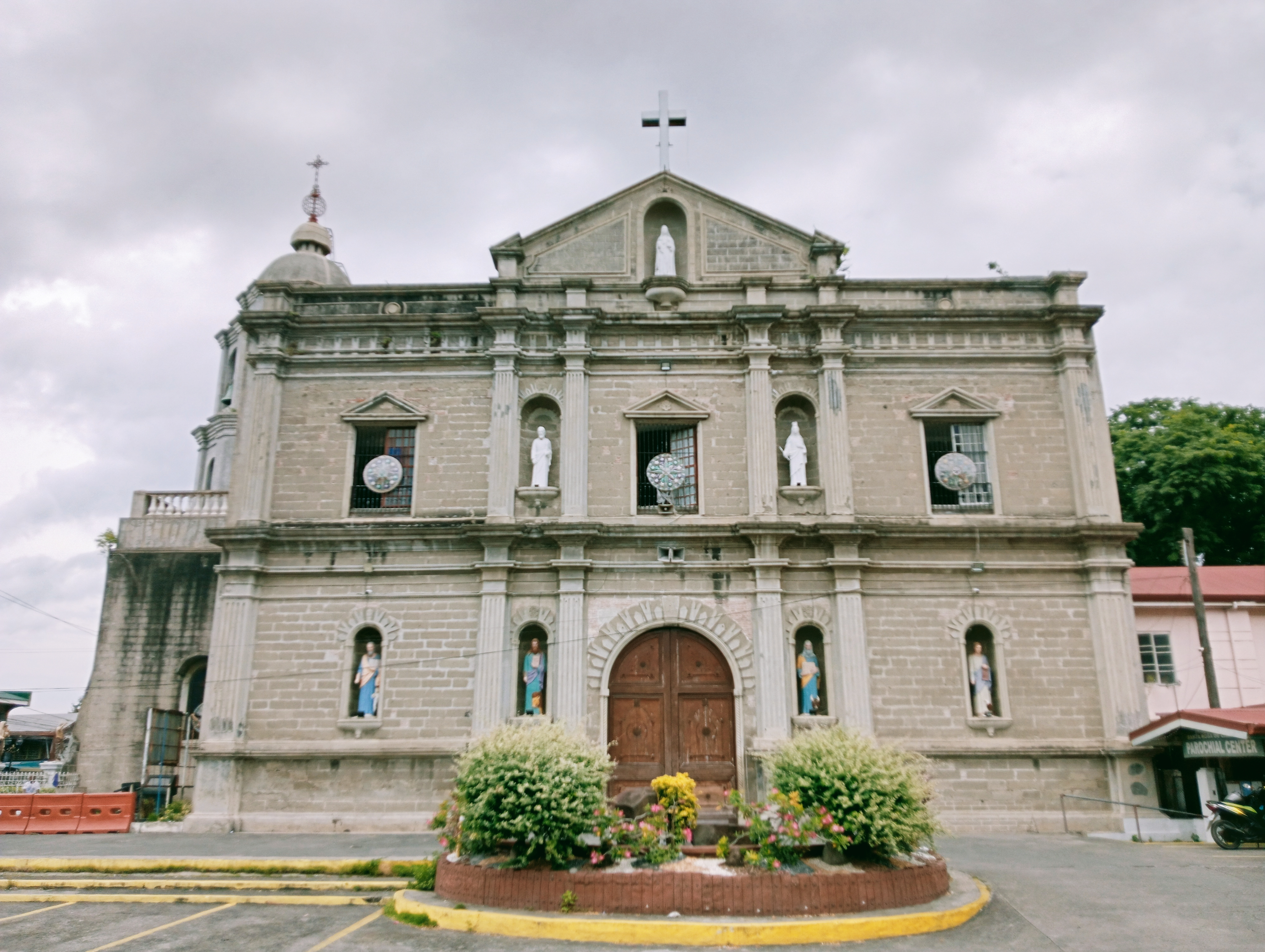
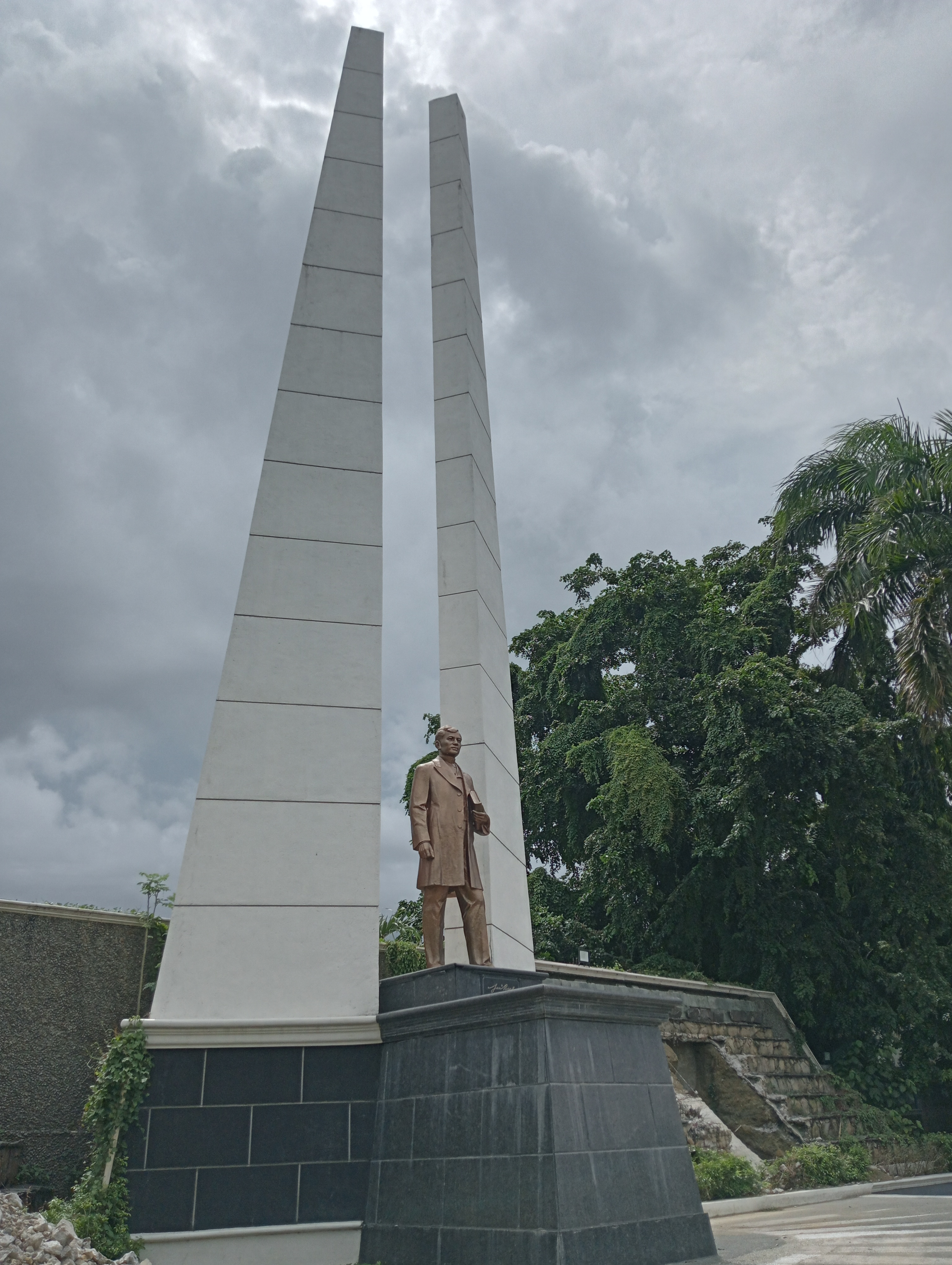
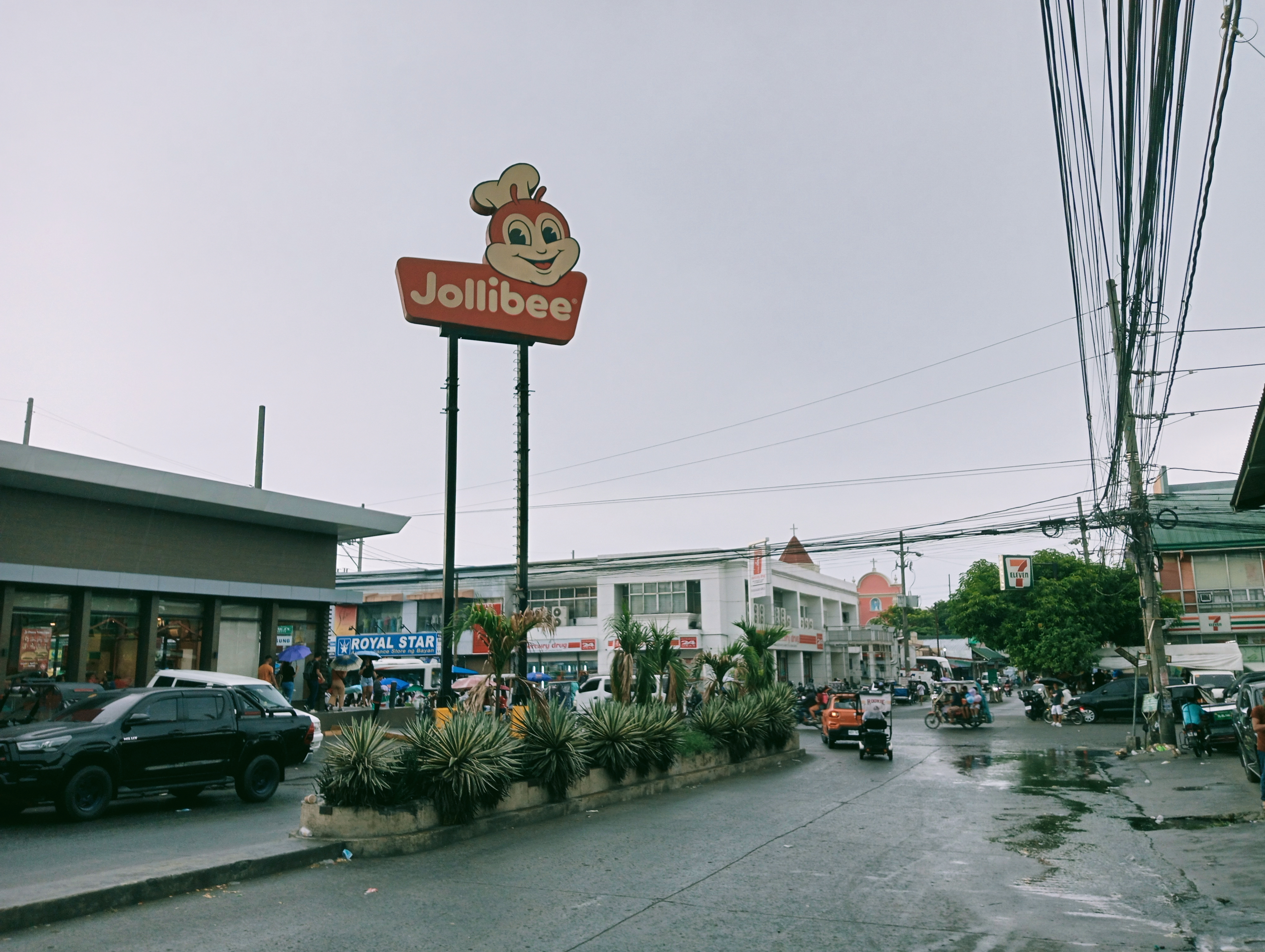
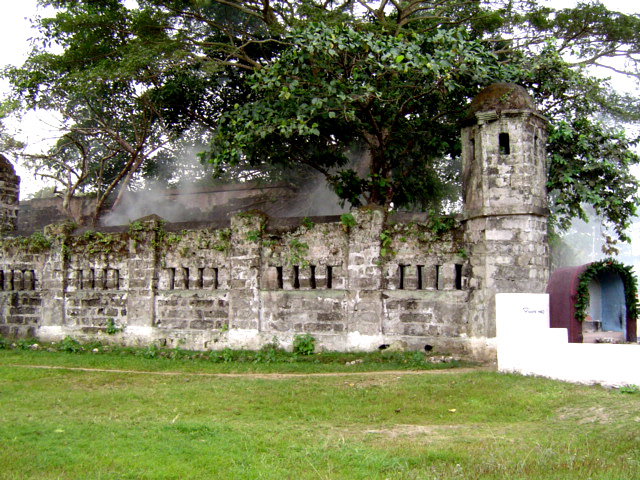
- WW2 VFP Monument Santa Rosa Arch Multi-Purpose Complex Santa Rosa de Lima Parish Church Rizal Monument Santa Rosa Commercial Complex Cuartel de Santo Domingo Enchanted Kingdom

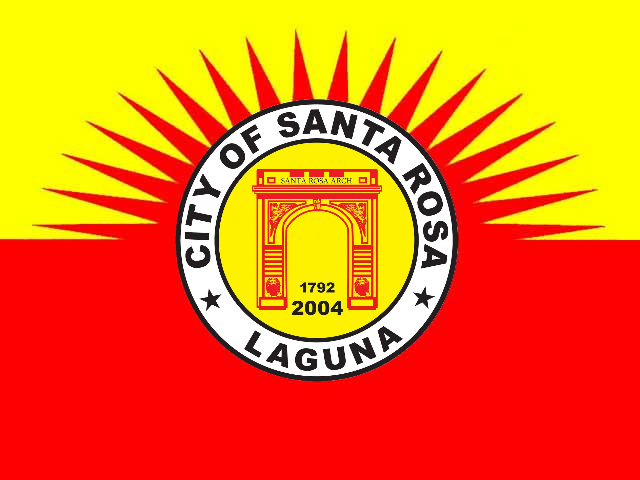
- Flag Seal

- Map of Laguna with Santa Rosa highlighted
- Interactive map of Santa Rosa
- Location within the Philippines
- Coordinates: 14°19′N 121°07′E
- Country: Philippines
- Region: Calabarzon
- Province: Laguna
- District: Lone district
- Founded: January 18, 1792
- Cityhood: July 10, 2004
- Named for: Rose of Lima
- Barangays: 18 (see Barangays)

Government
  - Type: Sangguniang Panlungsod
  - Mayor: Arlene B. Arcillas (Lakas–CMD)
  - Vice Mayor: Arnold B. Arcillas (Lakas–CMD)
  - Representative: Roy Gonzales (PFP)
  - City Council: Members: Ma. Janine Cydner R. Aala; Ma. Theresa C. Aala; Luisito B. Algabre; Manuel G. Alipon; Eusebio C. Batitis Jr.; Laudemer A. Carta; Jose B. Catindig Jr.; Mythor C. Cendaña; Carmela Rosa G. Colmenar; Petronio C. Factoriza; Antonia T. Laserna; Niño Marco R. Villanueva; Liga ng mga Barangay President; Godofredo Z. Dela Rosa; Sangguniang Kabataan President; Patrick A. De Guzman
  - Electorate: 231,659 voters (2025)

Area
  - Total: 54.84 km^{2} (21.17 sq mi)
- Elevation: 70 m (230 ft)
- Highest elevation: 392 m (1,286 ft)
- Lowest elevation: 2 m (6.6 ft)

Population (2024 census)
  - Total: 430,920
  - Rank: 2 out of 30 (in Laguna)
  - Density: 7,858/km^{2} (20,350/sq mi)
  - Households: 122,458

Economy
  - Income class: 1st city income class
  - Poverty incidence: 2.9% (2023)
  - Revenue: ₱ 6,251 million (2024)
  - Assets: ₱ 19,616 million (2024)
  - Expenditure: ₱ 358 million (2024)
  - Liabilities: ₱ 4,381 million (2024)

Service provider
  - Electricity: Manila Electric Company (Meralco)
- Time zone: UTC+8 (PST)
- ZIP code: 4026; 4034 (Laguna Technopark)
- PSGC: 043428000
- IDD : area code: +63 (0)49
- Native languages: Tagalog
- Website: www.santarosacity.gov.ph

Santa Rosa, officially the City of Santa Rosa (Filipino: Lungsod ng Santa Rosa), is a component city in the province of Laguna, Philippines. According to the 2024 census, it has a population of 430,920 people.

It is the second largest local government unit in Laguna after Calamba. Located 40 kilometers (25 mi) south of Manila, it was rapidly developed into an urban area as a result of the growing congestion and conurbation of the Manila metropolitan area which is collectively known as the Greater Manila Area

Santa Rosa's name is derived from Saint Rose of Lima, its patron saint. The town was initially known for the Coca-Cola, RC Cola, and Toyota manufacturing plants in its industrial estates. It later became popular as the site of the Enchanted Kingdom, the first and only world-class theme park in the country, and several housing and commercial developments.

== History ==
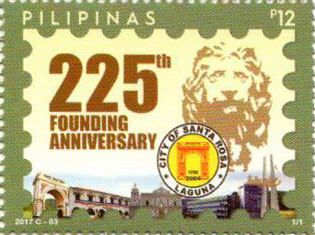
2017 stamp of the Philippines dedicated to the 225th anniversary of Santa Rosa

In 1571, Spanish conquistador Juan de Salcedo, the grandson of Miguel López de Legazpi, founded the town of Biñan which was annexed as a barrio to Tabuco (now Cabuyao) while exploring the region of Laguna de Bay.

In 1688, Biñan, together with Barrio Bukol, separated from Cabuyao. After a series of renaming and separating barrios to become independent towns, Barrio Bukol was politically emancipated as the municipality of Santa Rosa, founded on January 18, 1792.

During the revolutionary period in 1898, the town was instrumental in the proclamation of Philippine independence from Spain when the country signed the Act of Independence on June 12, 1898. Later on, the town's local revolutionaries fought alongside the forces of Pío del Pilar during the Philippine–American War.

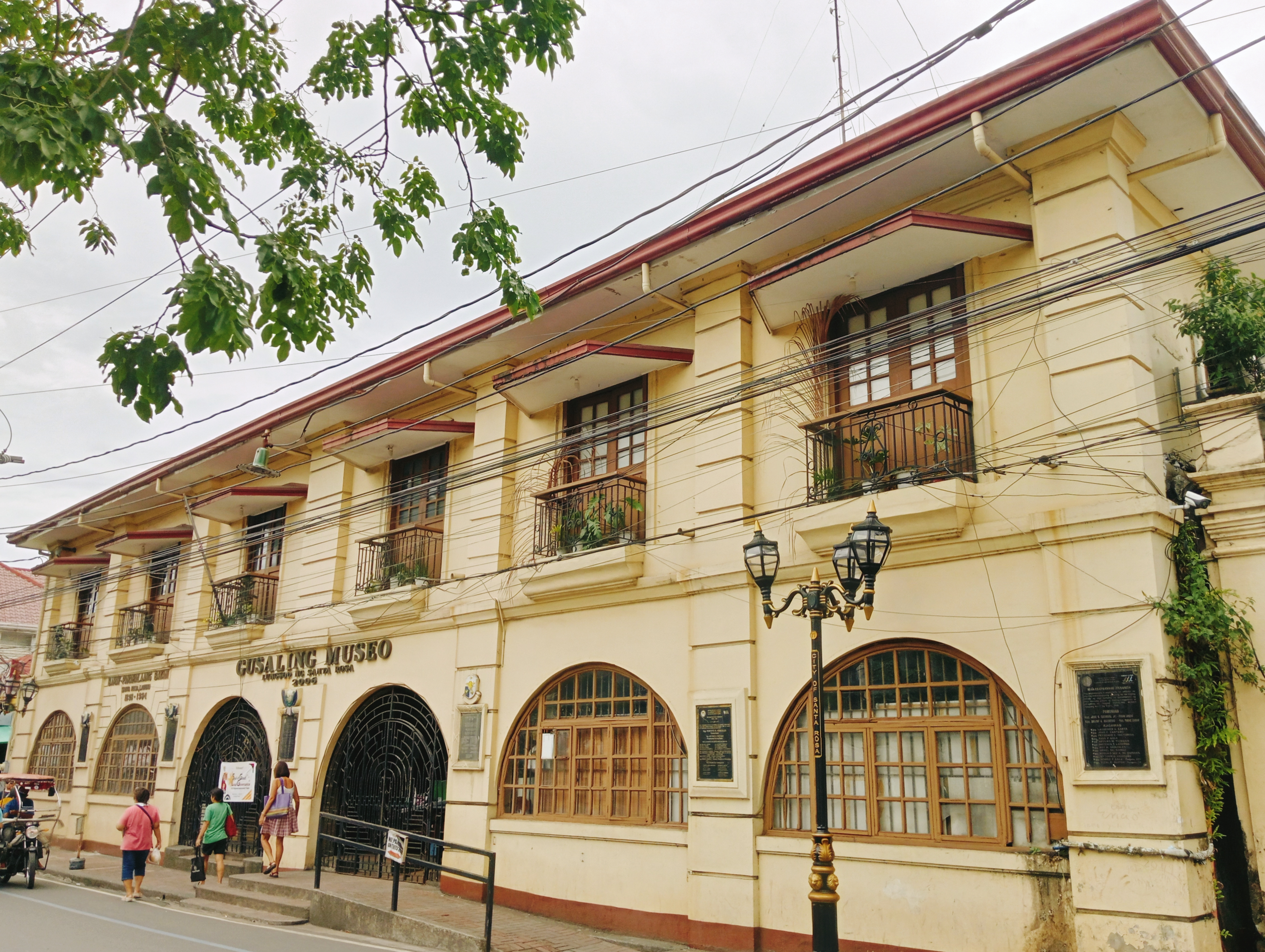
The present-day Gusaling Museo served as the municipal hall of Santa Rosa from 1828 to 1954.

On February 5, 1945, the town was abandoned by Japanese soldiers when the local guerrilla resistance movement, with support from the American and Filipino military contingent, entered the town.

During the postwar era up until the 1970s, the townspeople primarily depended on basic agriculture and family-owned enterprises for their livelihood. The influence of industrialization grew in the 1980s with the entry of local and foreign investors who were responsible for the fast-paced economic and social transformation of the town and the province.

=== Cityhood ===
On July 10, 2004, Santa Rosa was converted into a city by Republic Act No. 9264, which was approved by voters in the plebiscite. Leon Arcillas, who began his third and final term ten days before, became its first city mayor.

=== Contemporary ===
Leon Arcillas was assassinated at the old city hall by three assailants. They were convicted and sentenced to life imprisonment in 2013. Jose Catindig Jr., who served as vice mayor, became mayor to serve out the remainder of his term. On May 14, 2007, Catindig, who ran for his full term as mayor, was defeated by Arcillas' daughter Arlene.

On August 28, 2019, President Rodrigo Duterte signed Republic Act No. 11395, which separated the city from the province's first district to be granted its own congressional district to elect a representative in 2022. In 2024, the city gained its own representation in the Laguna Provincial Board to separately elect two members starting in 2025.

== Geography ==
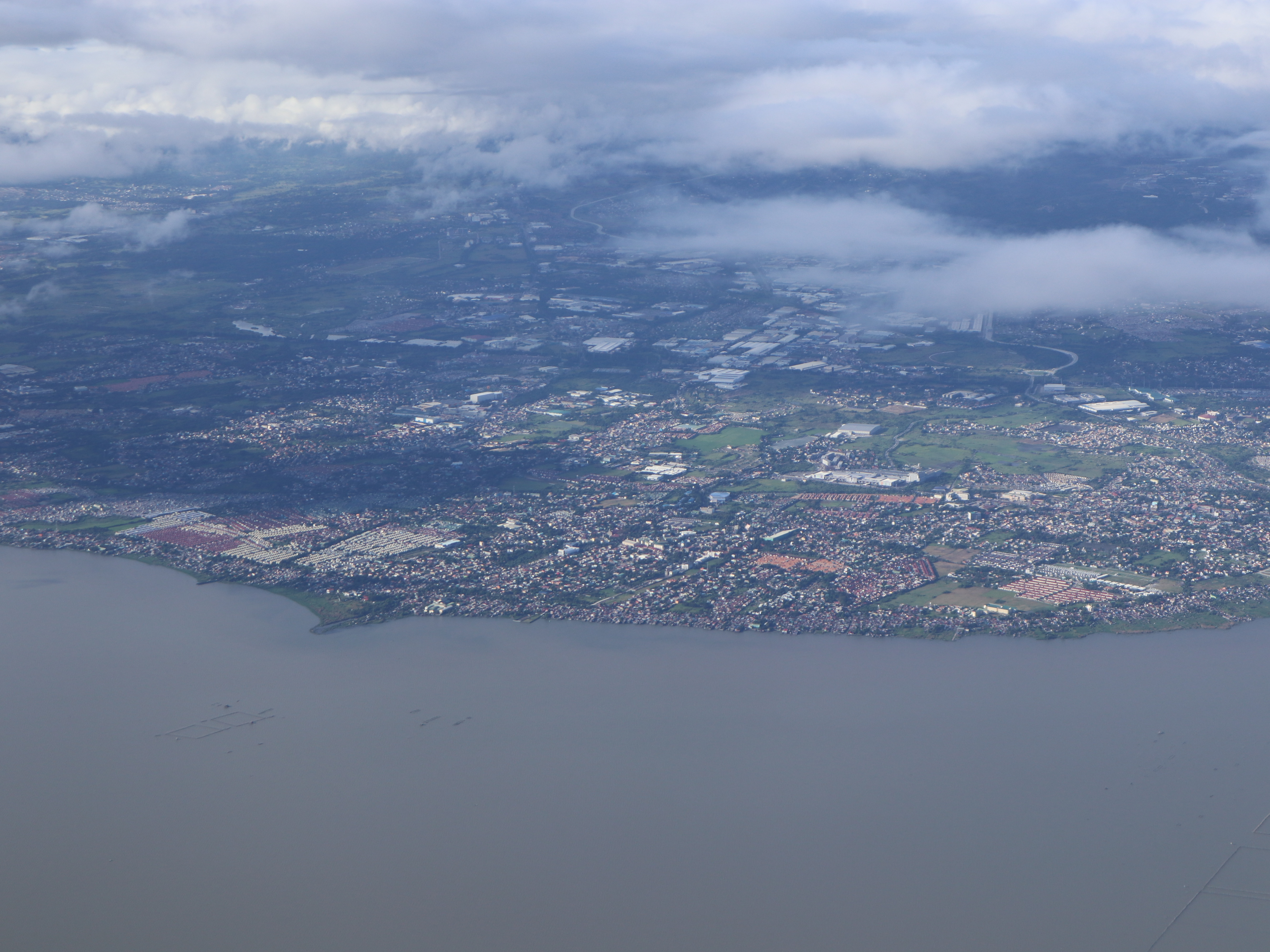
Santa Rosa aerial view

Santa Rosa's land area is approximately 54.13 square kilometers (20.90 sq mi). It is located west of the Laguna de Bay.

The western half of the city occupies the numerous commercial, industrial, and business establishments, while the other is primarily composed of residential areas and subdivisions, schools, industrial zones, and various business establishments.

Santa Rosa is 47 kilometers (29 mi) from Santa Cruz, 40 kilometers (25 mi) from Manila, and 29 kilometers (18 mi) from Tagaytay.

=== Barangays ===
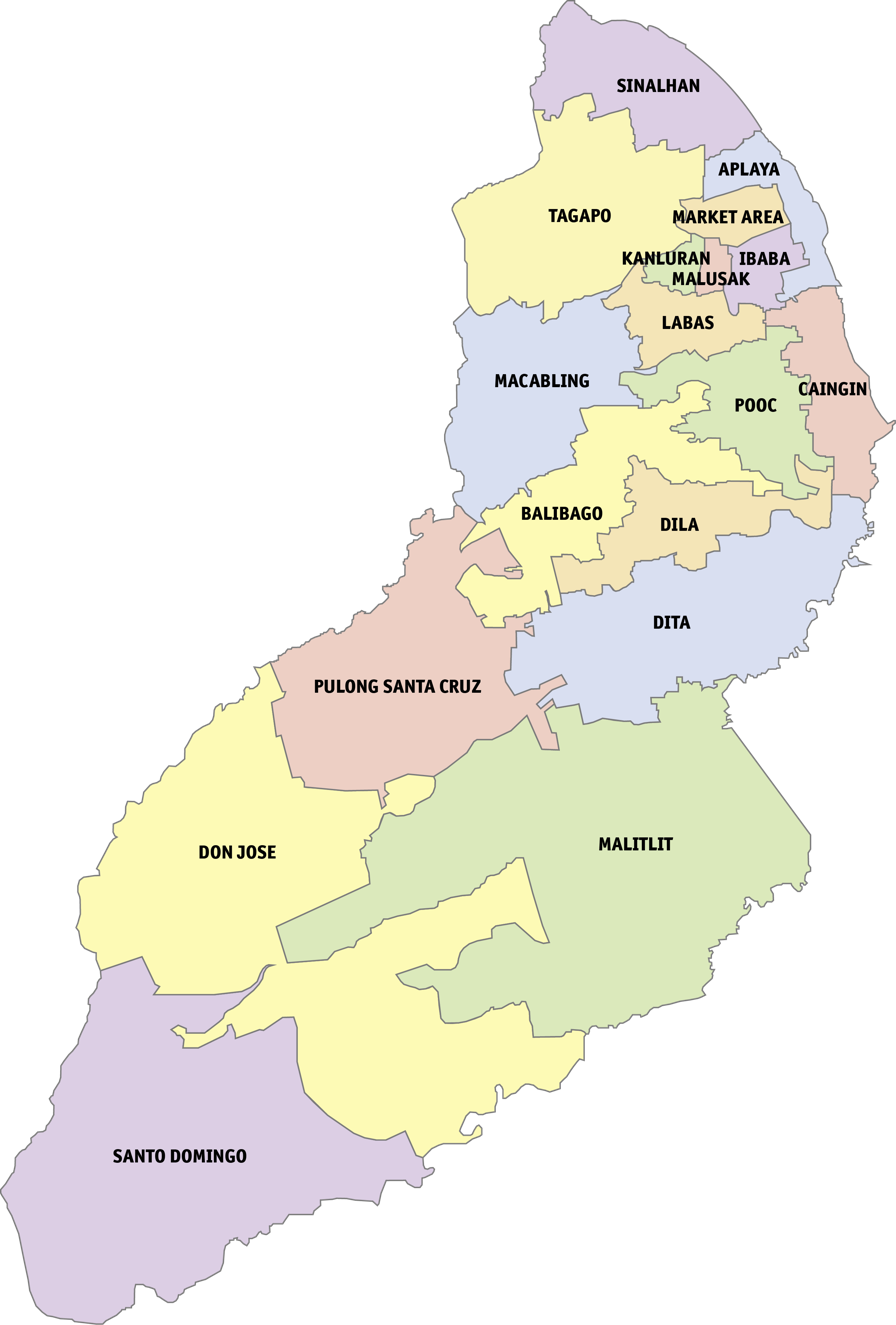
Political map of Santa Rosa, Laguna

Santa Rosa is politically subdivided into 18 barangays, as indicated below. Each barangay consists of puroks and some have sitios.

- Aplaya
- Balibago
- Caingin
- Dila
- Dita
- Don Jose
- Ibaba
- Kanluran (Poblacion Uno)
- Labas
- Macabling
- Malitlit
- Malusak (Poblacion Dos)
- Market Area (Poblacion Tres)
- Pooc (Pook)
- Pulong Santa Cruz
- Santo Domingo
- Sinalhan
- Tagapo

=== Climate ===
Climate data for Santa Rosa City, Laguna
Month	Jan	Feb	Mar	Apr	May	Jun	Jul	Aug	Sep	Oct	Nov	Dec	Year
Mean daily maximum °C (°F)	29 (84)	30 (86)	32 (90)	34 (93)	32 (90)	31 (88)	29 (84)	29 (84)	29 (84)	30 (86)	30 (86)	29 (84)	30 (87)
Mean daily minimum °C (°F)	21 (70)	20 (68)	21 (70)	22 (72)	24 (75)	24 (75)	24 (75)	24 (75)	24 (75)	23 (73)	22 (72)	21 (70)	23 (73)
Average precipitation mm (inches)	10 (0.4)	10 (0.4)	12 (0.5)	27 (1.1)	94 (3.7)	153 (6.0)	206 (8.1)	190 (7.5)	179 (7.0)	120 (4.7)	54 (2.1)	39 (1.5)	1,094 (43)
Average rainy days	5.2	4.5	6.4	9.2	19.7	24.3	26.9	25.7	24.4	21.0	12.9	9.1	189.3
Source: Meteoblue

== Demographics ==
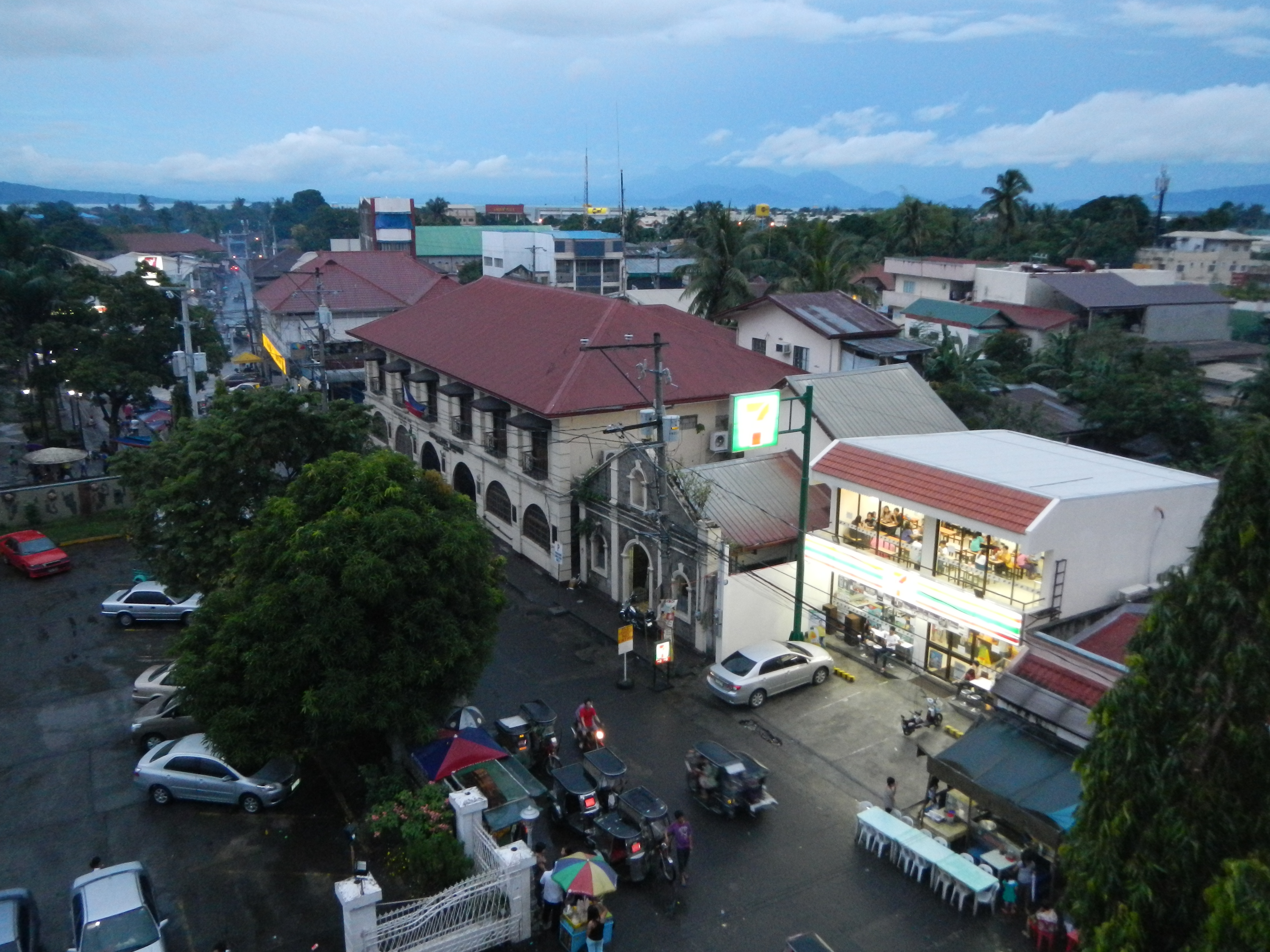
Santa Rosa downtown

The population of Santa Rosa is fast-growing with an intercensal growth rate of 7% from 1990 to 1995 and continuing to increase in subsequent decades.

Population census of Santa Rosa

Year	Pop.	±% p.a.
1903	7,339	—
1918	10,557	+2.45%
1939	15,069	+1.71%
1948	17,259	+1.52%
1960	26,583	+3.66%
1970	41,335	+4.51%
1975	47,639	+2.89%
1980	64,325	+6.19%

Year	Pop.	±% p.a.
1990	94,719	+3.95%
1995	138,257	+7.34%
2000	185,633	+6.52%
2007	266,943	+5.14%
2010	284,670	+2.37%
2015	353,767	+4.23%
2020	414,812	+3.41%
2024	430,920	+0.92%

Source: Philippine Statistics Authority

Population density
Year	Density
1990	1,730/km^{2}
1995	2,520/km^{2}
2000	3,400/km^{2}
2007	4,900/km^{2}
2010	5,200/km^{2}
2015	6,500/km^{2}
2020	7,600/km^{2}
2024	7,900/km^{2}

=== Ethnic groups ===
Like other places in Metro Manila, the original settlers in Santa Rosa are Tagalogs. Throughout the centuries, there has been constant migration of Spaniards, Visayans, Bikolanos, Ilokanos, Chinese, Americans, Japanese, and Koreans.

=== Languages ===
The main language is Filipino, which is based on Tagalog. In addition, due to continuous development of the city, English is used in education, business and information technology.

=== Religion ===
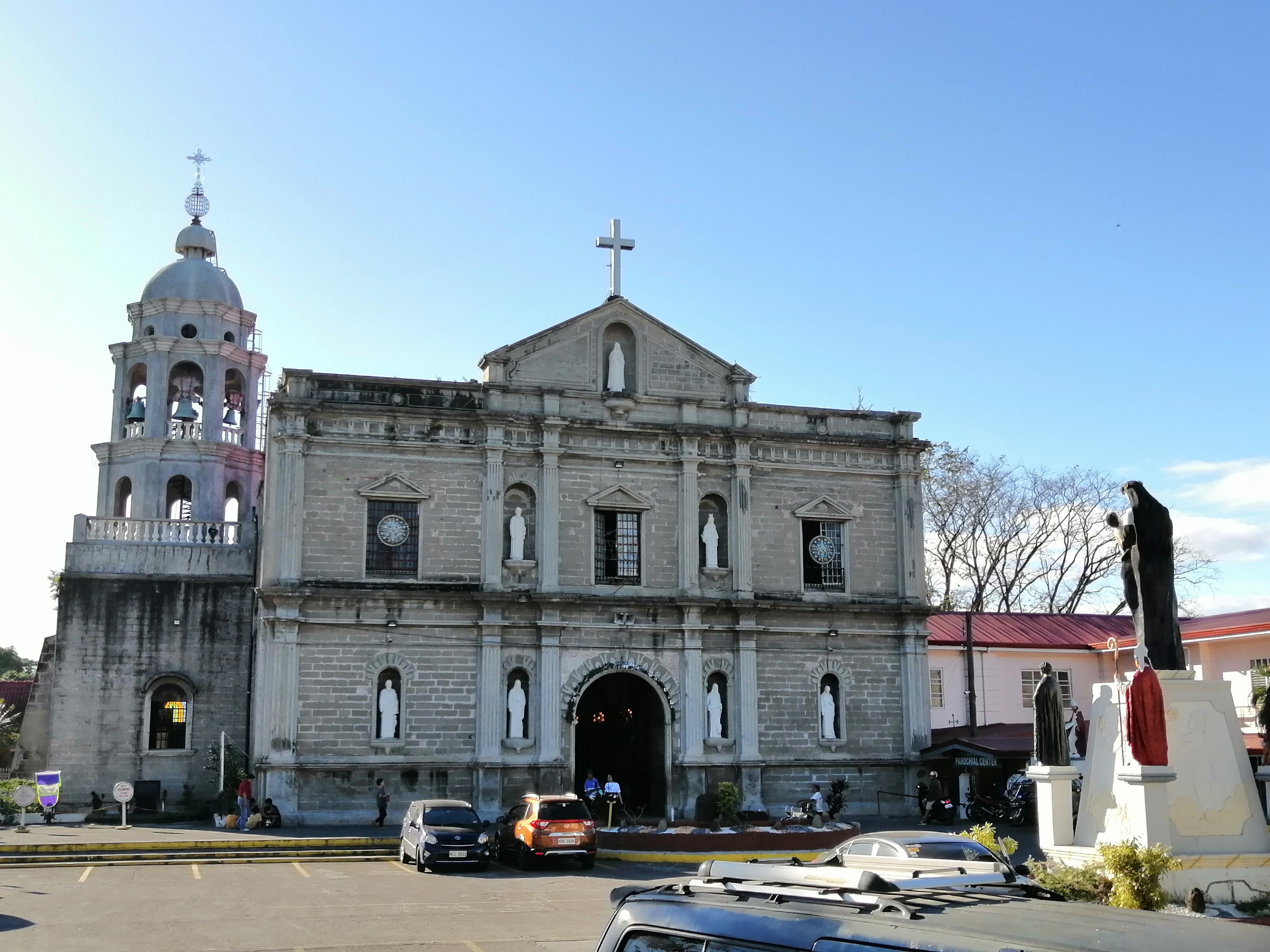
Santa Rosa de Lima Parish Church, located at the city proper

Most people are Catholics. Other religious groups represented include the Aglipayans (members of the Iglesia Filipina Independiente – a breakout group from the Catholic Church in 1902 headed by the Union Obrera Democratica), the Church of God International, the United Church of Christ in the Philippines, Jesus Is Lord Church, Baptist, Jehovah's Witness, Iglesia ni Cristo and Iglesia Evangelica Unida de Cristo (Unida Evangelical Christian Church). In 1994, some migrants and expatriates have formed the Saint Nicholas Orthodox Church (under the canonical jurisdiction of The Orthodox Metropolitanate of Hong Kong/Philippines-Ecumenical Patriarchate) in Golden City Subdivision.

== Economy ==
Poverty incidence of Santa Rosa (%)

Source: Philippine Statistics Authority

Santa Rosa is considered to be the premier city and hub of South Luzon. It serves as the primary economic, commercial, and financial hub of the province making it widely known as the Lion City of South Luzon. In 2022, the city had an income of ₱4.99 billion. It became the richest city in Luzon outside of Metro Manila in terms of annual income generated locally. Tagapo, Don Jose, Santo Domingo, and Pulong Santa Cruz are the four barangays that generate and contribute larger revenues locally due to its massive malls and industrial parks located within the boundaries of these barangays.

Special economic zones and industrial parks in Santa Rosa include:

- Laguna Technopark Inc.
- Greenfield Automotive Park
- Toyota Special Economic Zone
- Lakeside Evozone Nuvali
- Daystar Santa Rosa Industrial Park
- Santa Rosa Commercial Complex
- Meridian Industrial Complex

Townships such as Greenfield City, Nuvali, Eton City, and Sta. Elena City are also located within the city.

=== Retail ===
SM City Santa Rosa

The city hosts various shopping malls, including SM City Santa Rosa, Robinsons Sta. Rosa, Ayala Malls Nuvali (formerly Ayala Malls Solenad), Walter Mart Santa Rosa, Walter Mart Santa Rosa Bel-Air, Victory Mall Santa Rosa, Target Mall, Vista Mall Sta. Rosa, Paseo Outlets (formerly and still commonly known as Paseo de Santa Rosa), and Eton City Square. A new CityMall branch and SM Nuvali are currently under construction.

The city is also the location of the first Dali grocery store, which opened in February 2020.

=== Industries and manufacturing ===
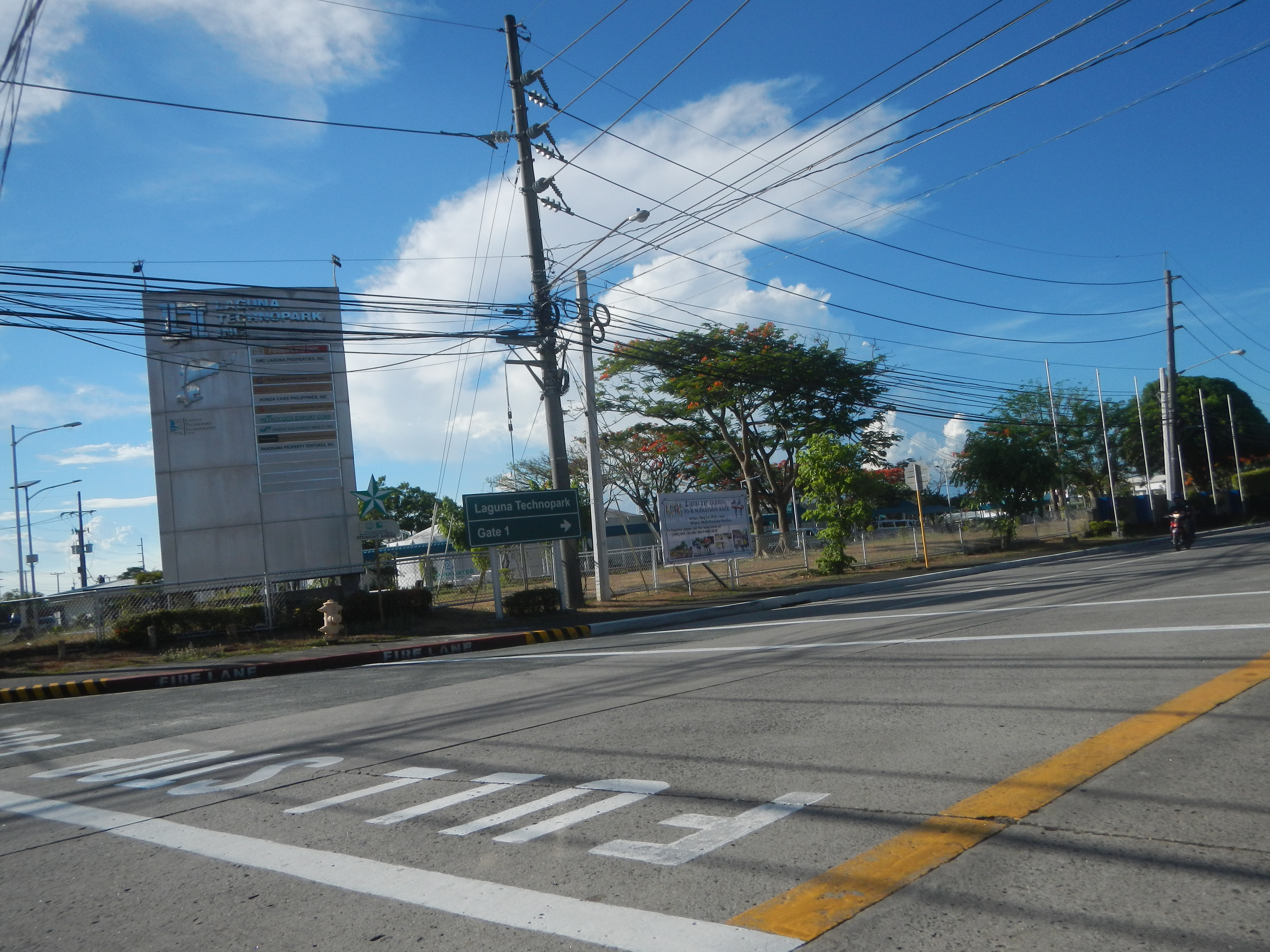
Laguna Technopark Gate 1 in Don Jose

Dubbed as the "Motor City of the Philippines" or "Detroit City of the Philippines", Santa Rosa hosts multinational automotive giants Nissan, Toyota, and Mitsubishi – all contributing 95% of the country's automotive production. It is also the location for the headquarters of Santarosa Motor Works, Inc.

Food conglomerate Monde Nissin Corporation, which manufactures Lucky Me! instant noodles and Monde biscuits, has a 14-hectare (35-acre) manufacturing facility in barangay Balibago. San Miguel Brewery and Magnolia also have a plant in barangay Pulong Santa Cruz. Santa Rosa is also home to the largest plant of The Coca-Cola Company in the Philippines, situated next to the Santa Rosa Exit of South Luzon Expressway. In 2018, Santa Rosa became the new home of HAMBURG Trading Corporation's 7,000-square-meter (75,000 sq ft) facility that houses the company's warehouse, administration office, and state-of-the-art demo kitchen – all in one roof.

=== Information technology ===
Santa Rosa is aiming to be a hub for the BPO industry. It is currently ranked 82nd in the world for its competitiveness in the Information Technology and Business Process Outsourcing services (IT-BPO) by the strategic advisory firm, THOLONS. BPO companies present in Santa Rosa are IQOR, KGB, Teletech, IBM and Concentrix, mostly located in SM City Santa Rosa and Nuvali.

== Education ==
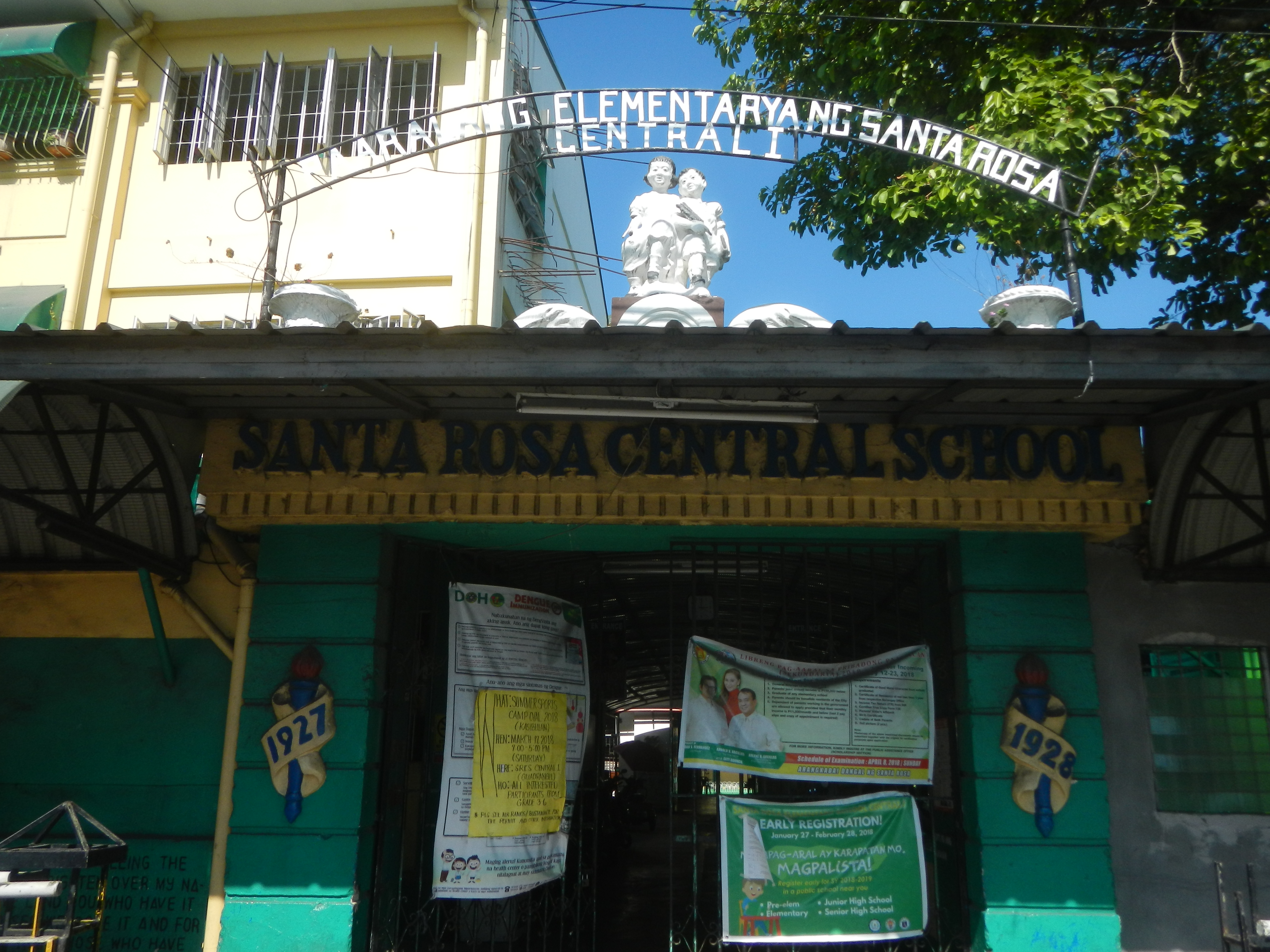
Santa Rosa Elementary School Central I

Santa Rosa holds many schools, facilities and tutorial centers. There are 18 public elementary schools and 10 public high schools in the city, all overseen by the Department of Education - Schools Division Office (SDO) of Santa Rosa City headed by Hereberto Jose D. Miranda, CESO VI, School Division Superintendent, as well as 84 private schools as of 2023. The Canossians built their first Canossian school in the Philippines in Santa Rosa. For 25 years Laguna BelAir School taught students before closing during the COVID-19 pandemic era.

Several higher education institutions headquartered outside the city have established branch or satellite campuses in Santa Rosa. Polytechnic University of the Philippines has one campus in Santa Rosa, as well as STI College, Citi Global College, Ateneo de Manila University (Ateneo Professional Schools), and Our Lady of Fatima University. Under-construction and planned satellite campuses include those of University of Santo Tomas, University of the East, and National University, respectively.

== Transportation ==
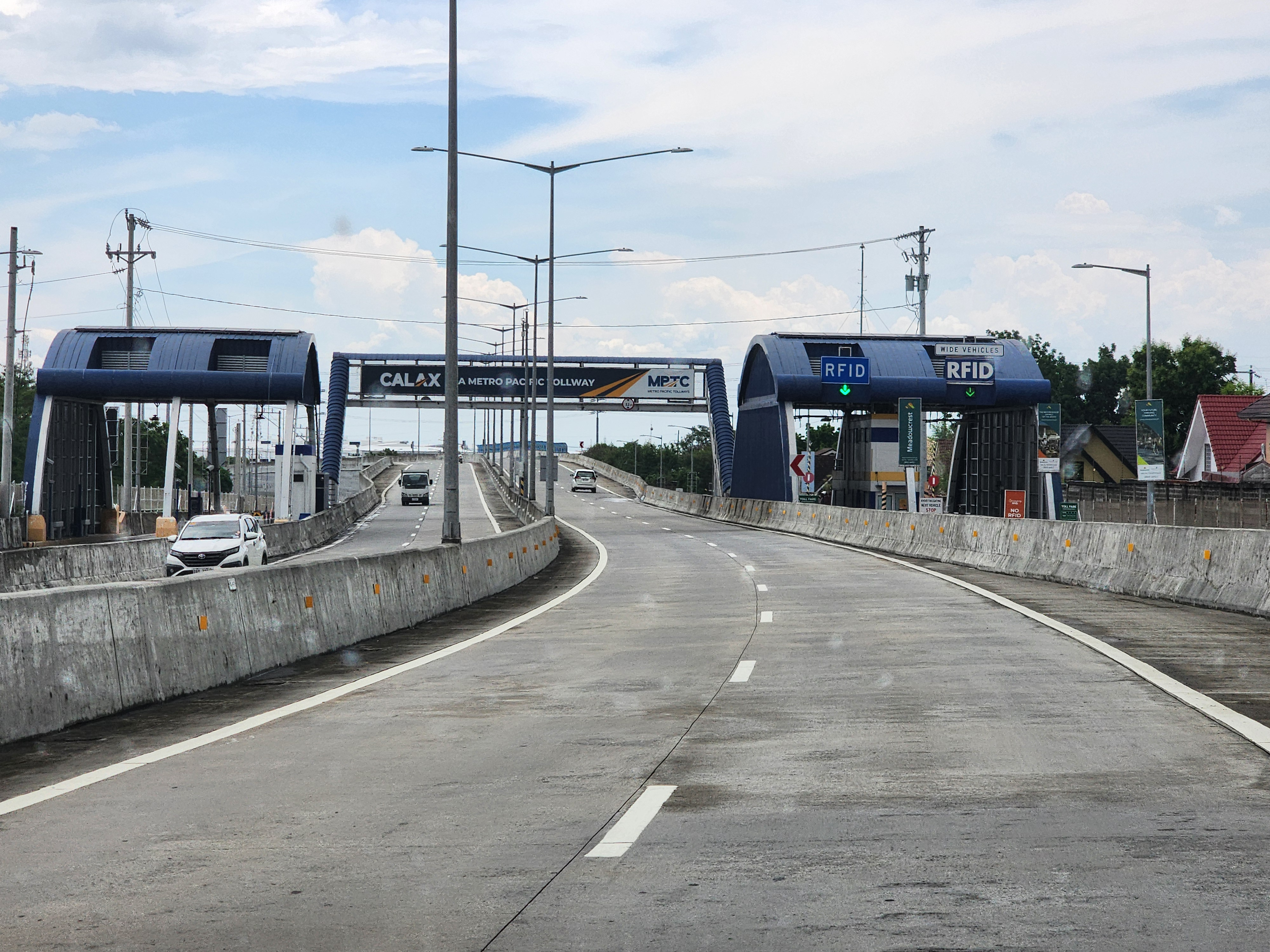
CALAX–Laguna Boulevard interchange in Don Jose

Along with other areas of the Philippines, the city drives on the right side of the road. Santa Rosa is serviced by South Luzon Expressway (SLEX) and Cavite–Laguna Expressway (CALAX). Two exits of SLEX are located in the city: Santa Rosa Exit and Eton City (Malitlit) Exit. The city is also accessible through Greenfield City (Mamplasan) Exit in Biñan, which provides access to CALAX, SM City Santa Rosa, and the Santa Rosa city proper. Two exits of CALAX directly serve the city, namely: Santa Rosa–Tagaytay Exit (located in Barangay Santo Domingo, infront of SM Nuvali) and Laguna Boulevard Exit (located within Barangay Don Jose). The Manila South Road from Alabang, Muntinlupa up to Calamba, Laguna passes through the city. Another road, Santa Rosa–Tagaytay Road, acts as the main route for people going up to Tagaytay from Metro Manila, especially on weekends and vacation periods.

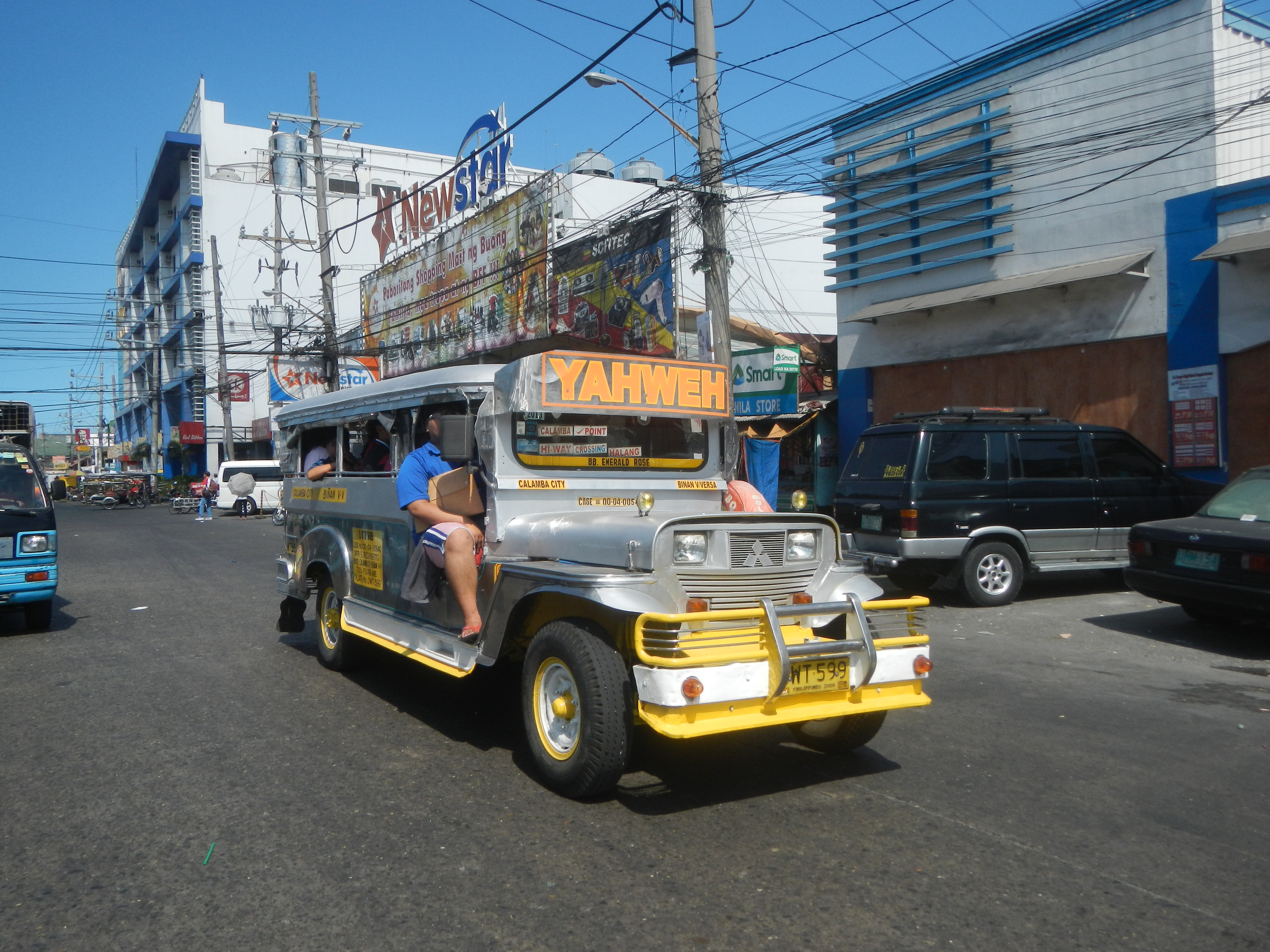
A jeepney plying the Santa Rosa Commercial Complex in Balibago

Public transportation within the city, like in most of the urban areas in the Philippines, is facilitated mostly using traditional jeepneys. Tricycles are also used for short distances. Most gated residential villages, like Laguna BelAir, relies on their own transportation within their village premises. The Santa Rosa railway station of the Philippine National Railways in the city proper, which will be replaced by the under-construction North–South Commuter Railway station near SM City Santa Rosa, serve the city. The city is also the location of the Santa Rosa Commercial Complex, a well-known intermodal transport and commercial hub in Barangay Balibago, and the Santa Rosa Integrated Terminal, a provincial bus station at SM City Santa Rosa in Barangay Tagapo serving Metro Manila and eventually other parts south of Metro Manila. Point-to-point (P2P) bus terminals are also located at Nuvali Transport Terminal in barangay Santo Domingo for buses bound for Makati and the Ninoy Aquino International Airport (NAIA), respectively, and in front of Robinsons Santa Rosa in Barangay Tagapo for buses bound for the NAIA. The city relies heavily to NAIA for air transport due to its proximity and it is the closest aviation hub in the South. Grab, which is Southeast Asia's Uber, is also available in the city.

== Infrastructure ==
=== Utilities and communication ===
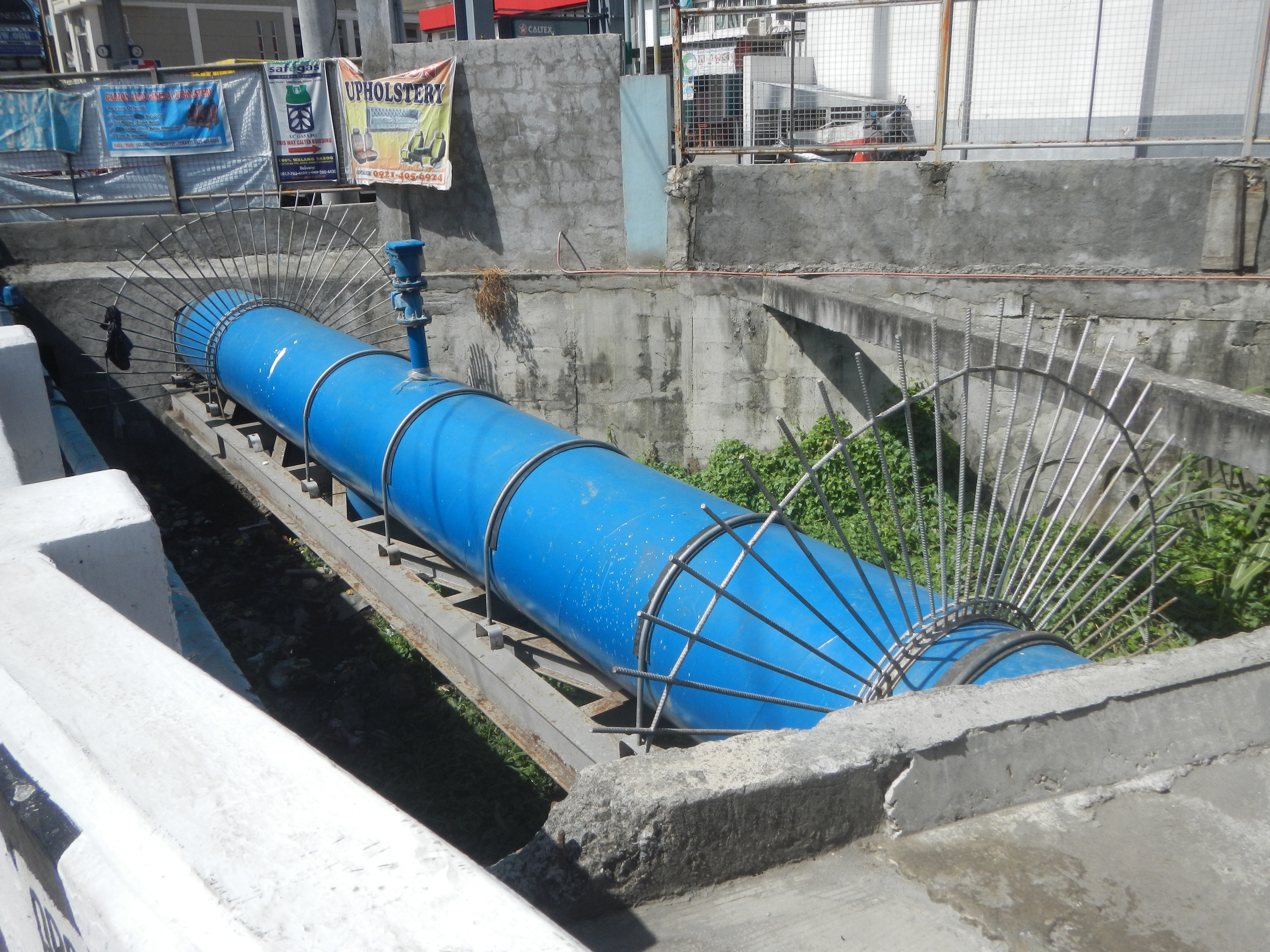
An aqueduct in Pulong Santa Cruz

Santa Rosa's source of electricity is partly from Meralco. Its water supply is provided by the Laguna Water Inc., except for Vista Land Developments (including Sta. Elena City), which is provided by its former sister company, Hiraya Water Corporation (formerly PrimeWater). Santa Rosa's communication system is powered by Philippine Long Distance Telephone (PLDT) and Globe Telecom, and the cellular network in the Philippines, particularly in metropolitan areas, is increasing due to the low cost of calls and text messaging. Globe Telecom, Smart Communications (PLDT), and Dito Telecommunity provide cellular networks in Santa Rosa. Cable and satellite television access is provided by SkyCable, G Sat, Cignal Digital TV, and Royal Cable. Internet Digital Subscriber Line or DSL coverage is provided by PLDT, cable internet is serviced by SkyCable's ZPDee and Global Destiny. Fiber Internet Wireless broadband is provided by Globelines Broadband and Smart Communications.

=== Health ===
The Santa Rosa Community Hospital is the primary public hospital of Santa Rosa. The city also hosts at least seven other private hospitals: New Sinai MDI Hospital and Medical Center, Marian Hospital, Balibago Polyclinic and Hospital, St. James Hospital in Dita, Sta. Rosa Hospital and Medical Center along RSBS Boulevard in Balibago, The Medical City South Luzon in Greenfield City, and Healthway QualiMed Hospital – Sta. Rosa in Nuvali.

== Government ==
=== Local government ===
Santa Rosa City Hall

Santa Rosa is governed primarily by the city mayor, the vice mayor, and the city councilors. The mayor acts as the chief executive of the city while the city councilors act as its legislative body. The vice mayor, besides taking on mayoral responsibilities in case of a temporary vacancy, acts as the presiding officer of the city legislature. The legislative body is composed of 12 regular members and representatives from the barangay and the youth council. Additionally, the city elects a member to the House of Representatives and two members to the Laguna Provincial Board for its lone legislative district.

The city government is based at the Santa Rosa City Hall in the old city proper, alongside other local government offices. In 2025, Ayala Land and the Santa Rosa City Government signed a memorandum of understanding for a planned Santa Rosa Civic Complex to be located in Nuvali, which covers Barangay Santo Domingo.

=== Elected officials ===
Santa Rosa city officials (2025–2028)
Name	Party
House of Representatives
Roy Gonzales	PFP
City Mayor
Arlene B. Arcillas	Lakas
City Vice Mayor
Arnold B. Arcillas	Lakas
City Councilors
Jose B. Catindig Jr.	Lakas
Carmela Rosa Gonzales-Colmenar	Lakas
Luisito B. Algabre	Lakas
Mythor C. Cendaña	Lakas
Ma. Theresa C. Aala	Lakas
Niño Marco R. Villanueva	Lakas
Antonia T. Laserna	Lakas
Laudemer A. Carta	Lakas
Eusebio C. Batitis Jr.	Independent
Ma. Janine Cydner R. Aala	Lakas
Petronio C. Factoriza	Lakas
Manuel G. Alipon	Lakas
Ex Officio City Council Members
ABC President	Godofredo Z. Dela Rosa (Dita)
SK President	Patrick A. De Guzman (Macabling)

=== List of chief executives ===
The following is the list of chief executives (capitan municipal / municipal president / mayor) of Santa Rosa.

1. Francisco Arambulo (1890–1894)
2. Basilio B. Gonzales (1899–1900)
3. Pedro Teaño Perlas (1900–1901)
4. Pablo Monsod Manguerra Sr. (1900–1901)
5. Celerino Castillo Tiongco (1905–1907)
6. Feliciano Arambulo Gomez (1908–1911)
7. Honorio Tiongco (1912–1916)
8. Lorenzo Cartagena Tatlonghari (1916–1922)
9. Jose Vallejo Zavalla (1922–1925)
10. Aquilino Carballo (1925–1926)
11. Felixberto Castro Tiongco (1926–1928)
12. Benito Lijauco delos Reyes (1928–1931)
13. Hermenegildo Regalado delos Reyes (1931–1937)
14. Celso Gonzaga Carteciano (1938–1940)
15. Valentin Regalado delos Reyes (1941–1942)
16. Jose Alumno Alinsod (1942 – August 1943)
17. Valentin Regalado delos Reyes (August–December 1943)
18. Eduardo de Leon Marcelo (1944)
19. Angel Z. Tiongco (1944 – March 6, 1945)
20. Jose Alumno Alinsod (March 7, 1945)
21. Francisco Gomez Arambulo Jr. (1946–1947)
22. Felimon delos Trinos de Guzman (1948–1951)
23. Gervacio Almira de Guzman (1952–1955)
24. Angel Z. Tiongco (1960–1978)
25. Cesar E. Nepomuceno (February 3, 1978 – December 3, 1987)
26. Zosimo B. Cartaño (February 3 – December 3, 1987)
27. Leo T. Bustamante (OIC, December 3, 1987 – February 2, 1988)
28. Roberto R. Gonzales (1988 – June 30, 1998)
29. Leon C. Arcillas (June 30, 1998 – May 10, 2005)
30. Jose B. Catindig, Jr. (May 11, 2005 – June 30, 2007)
31. Arlene B. Arcillas (June 30, 2007 – June 30, 2016)
32. Danilo Ramon S. Fernandez (June 30, 2016 – June 30, 2019)
33. Arlene B. Arcillas (June 30, 2019 – present)

=== List of vice-mayors ===
1. Antonio B. Dictado (June 30, 1988 – June 30, 1995)
2. Jose B. Catindig, Jr. (June 30, 1995 – June 30, 1998)
3. Octavio Ramon L. Lijauco (June 30, 1998 – June 30, 2001)
4. Jose B. Catindig, Jr. (June 30, 2001 – May 11, 2005)
5. Arlene B. Arcillas (May 11, 2005 – June 30, 2007)
6. Manuel G. Alipon (June 30, 2007 – June 30, 2010)
7. Arnel D.C. Gomez (June 30, 2010 – June 30, 2016)
8. Arnold B. Arcillas (June 30, 2016 – June 30, 2019)
9. Arnel D.C. Gomez (June 30, 2019 – June 30, 2022)
10. Arnold B. Arcillas ( June 30, 2022 – present)

== Sports ==
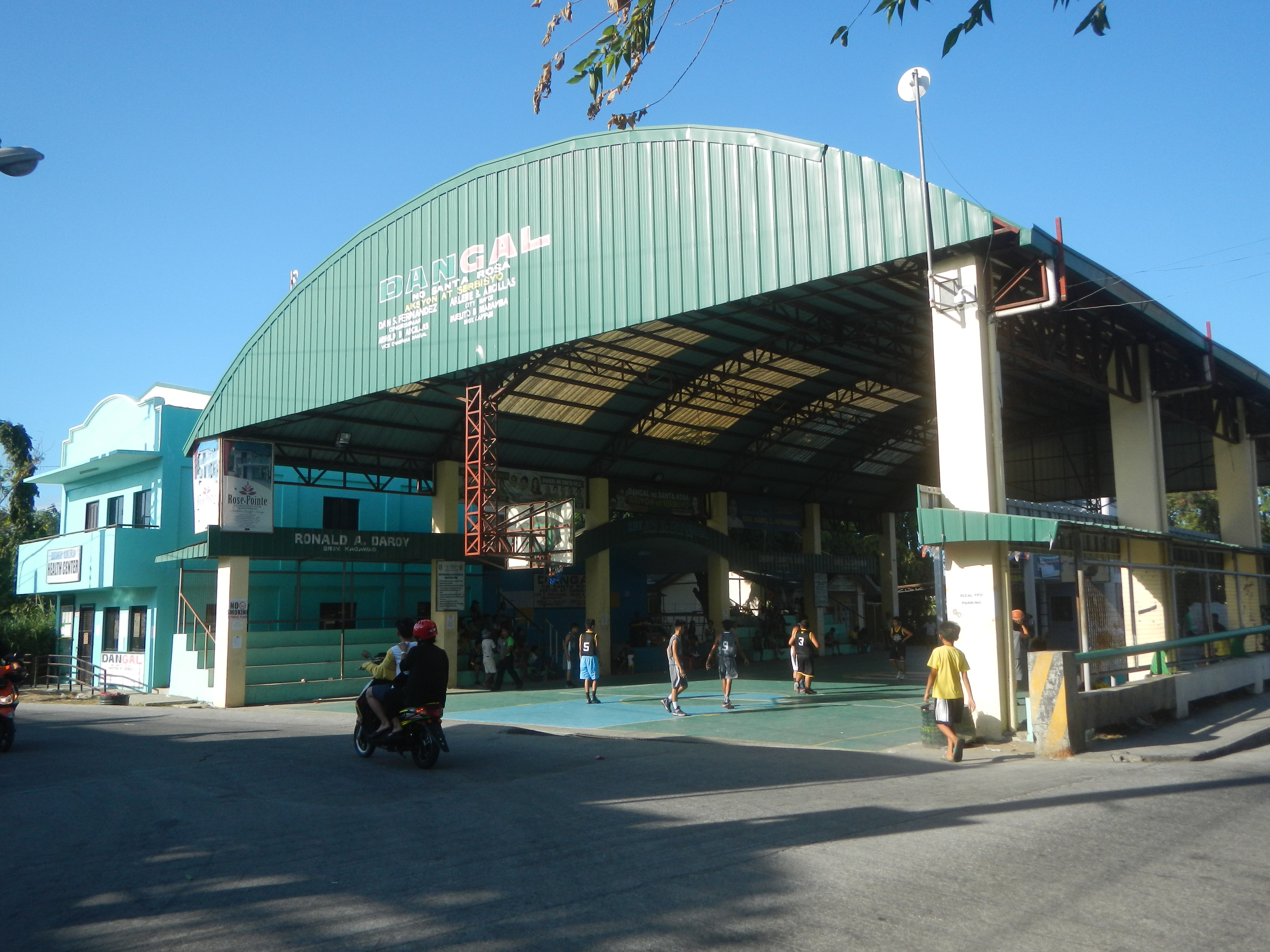
Kanluran Basketball Court

Santa Rosa is home to sports venues such as the City of Santa Rosa Multi-Purpose Complex, Nuvali Sand Courts, Santa Rosa Mega Cockpit, and Winner Badminton Court. The Multi-Purpose Complex, owned by the city government, was once the home of Laguna Krah Asia of the Maharlika Pilipinas Volleyball Association and Maharlika Pilipinas Basketball League, Santa Rosa Laguna Lions of the Pilipinas Super League, and San Miguel Alab Pilipinas of the ASEAN Basketball League. It is currently used as a venue for Philippine Basketball Association and Philippine Super Liga games. It also hosted the sport of netball at the 2019 Southeast Asian Games. The Nuvali Sand Courts in Barangay Santo Domingo is a notable venue for beach volleyball that has hosted the Smart Asian Volleyball Confederation (AVC) Beach Tour Nuvali Open in 2024. The Santa Rosa Mega Cockpit is home to cockfighting events.

Barangays in Santa Rosa have covered basketball courts, while residential villages in the city have sports facilities mostly located at its clubhouses.

== Sister cities ==
- Glendale, California
- Silay City, Negros Occidental

== Notable people ==
- Arlene B. Arcillas, incumbent mayor
- Maria Carpena, stage actress and soprano singer. She was the first recording artist in the Philippine music industry. She was also dubbed as the country's "Nightingale of Zarzuela".
- Danilo Fernandez, actor, former mayor, and incumbent representative
- Jason Fernandez, former vocalist of Rivermaya, singer
- Jef Gaitan, actress
- Mark Herras, actor
- Koreen Medina, actress and model
- Alden Richards, actor
- Nadine Samonte, actress
- Jodi Sta. Maria, actress
- Juancho Triviño, actor and host
- Alyssa Solomon, volleyball player and member of NU Lady Bulldogs
- Trisha Genesis, PVL player
