= Laguna BelAir School =

Private school in Laguna, Philippines

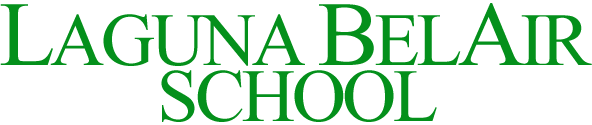

Location
- BelAir Drive; Laguna BelAir Subdivision; Santa Rosa City, Laguna; Philippines
- Coordinates: 14°15′58″N 121°04′19″E

Information
- Type: Private, Nonsectarian, Special Science and Mathematics
- Motto: I'm Aware, I Care, I Act, I'm A Steward
- Established: 1997
- Founder: Empire East Land Holdings, Inc.
- Status: Disbanded (2022)
- Closed: 2022
- Principal: Romelino R. Obinario
- Campus Director: Mercedes C. Danenberg
- Grades: K to 12
- Gender: Co-educational
- Campus: Suburb
- Houses: Emerald Team and Gold Team
- Colors: Emerald and Gold

Laguna BelAir Science School (LBASS, or BelAir) was a science and math oriented private school located in Santa Rosa City, Laguna, Philippines. The school's curriculum is patterned after that of the Philippine Science High School System. The school was founded on February 13, 1997, with an emphasis on science and mathematics.

In March 2021 due to the effects of the pandemic, they announced that they will be closing down the school year after 2021-2022. It has been 25 years of service for the school.

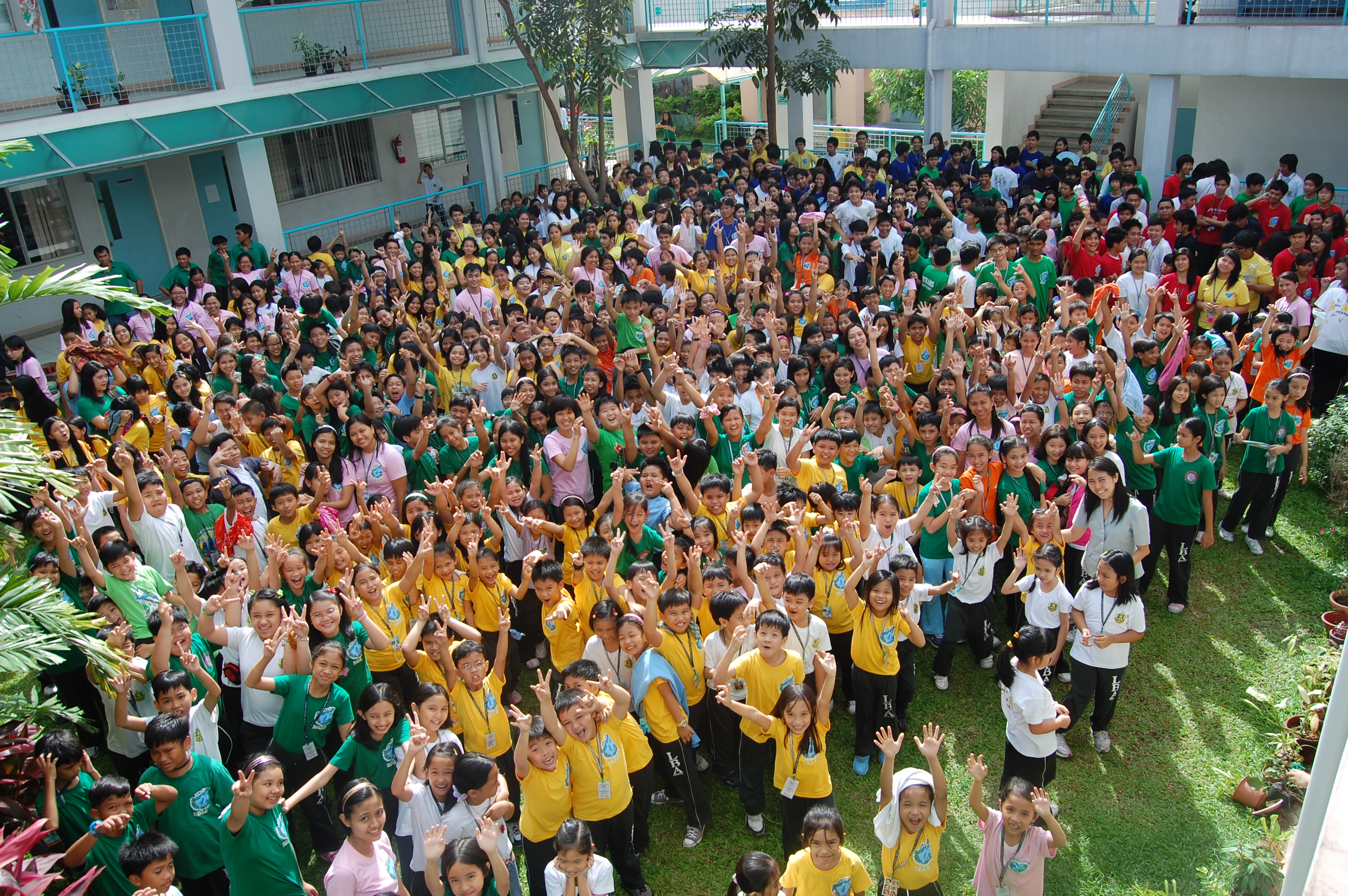
BelAir students at the HS Building quadraters
