= Canossa School of Santa Rosa, Laguna =

School in Laguna, Philippines

Canossa School, City of Santa Rosa, Laguna
- Official Seal of Canossa Sta. Rosa

Location
- Brgy. Kanluran; Santa Rosa, Laguna; Philippines; 14.3118°N 121.1064°E

Information
- Type: Private, Catholic
- Motto: To make Jesus known and loved
- Religious affiliation: Roman Catholic (Canossian Sisters)
- Established: June 14, 1954
- Principal: Grade School: Nemesia M. Paguican; High School: Jovy S. Benavides
- Directress: Jovy S. Benavides
- Enrollment: >2,000
- Colors: Blue and white
- Athletics: Intramurals, Unit Meet, PRISSA Meet, City Meet, One Laguna Provincial Meet, RSC and Palarong Pambansa
- Sports: Basketball, Volleyball, Badminton, Lawn Tennis, Table-Tennis, Swimming, Taekwondo, Karatedo, Chess, Baseball, Softball, Soccer, Futsal, and Athletics
- Nickname: CSSRL, Canossa, CPSGL, Pusong Canossians
- Affiliations: PAASCU
- Website: https://santarosa.canossa.ph/

Canossa School of Santa Rosa, Laguna is the first Canossian School and the first Canossian Sisters community in the Philippines. These Sisters belong to the religious congregation called the Canossian Daughters of Charity, which originated in Verona, Italy and whose members are spread all over the world. They came to the Philippines from the Canossian Province of Hong Kong to open apostolic missions where they were needed. Mother Dalisay Lazaga was a member of the Canossian Daughters of Charity, who is now under the process of sainthood.

== History ==
Responding to the invitation of Bishop Alejandro Olalia, a small group of Italian Missionary Sisters, Canossian Daughters of Charity – daughters of St. Magdalene of Canossa, arrived in Santa Rosa. The legendary Two sisters Mo. Ida Tamburlini and Mo. Marley Sardinha arrived first in the Philippines on February 2, 1954, and was soon joined by the Provincial Superior, Mo. Victoria Garre on March 15. They came to the quiet town of Santa Rosa.

Canossa School opened its door on June 14, 1954, they completed the first group of Canossian Sisters in the Philippines. This first community was composed of: M. Carolina Colombo, the Superior, M. Zita Bereta, M. Teresina Cantu, the Kindergarten teachers and with 4 lay teachers namely: Ms. Ida Tiongco, Ms. Eufrocina Custodio, Salome Sanchez, Dolores Rodriguez, and Mrs. Agulto. The school was named in honor of their foundress St. Magdalene of Canossa.

The 233 pupils did not pay any regular fee.

=== St. Magdalene of Canossa ===
She was born into the family of the Marquises of Canossa in Verona on 1 March 1774 and baptised on the next day. Sensitive to the needs of the poor of her city and guided by a profound religious sense, she discovered, with great difficulty, after many experiences and trials, her charism in the Church: she would choose to live the Gospel radically for God alone not according to the monastic form, but through dedication and service of the poor.

On May 8, 1808, she left definitively the palace of Canossa family and started her work with a few companions, gathering together and educating young girls from St. Zeno district. Later, the Institute of the Daughters of Charity extended to other Italian cities: Venice, Milan, Bergamo, and Trento, while Magdalene widened her contacts with religious and civil authorities so as to obtain support for her own and other charitable initiatives.

With the help of a Venetian priest and two laymen of Bergamo, she started the Congregation of the Sons of Charity on 23 May 1831. In her extensive apostolic activities, she involved numerous people, making them responsible together with her for promoting charity.

She died in Verona on 10 April 1835. She was proclaimed Blessed by Pope Pius XII on 8 December 1941 and canonized by Pope John Paul II on 2 October 1988.

=== St. Josephine Bakhita ===
Born in Olgossa in the Darfur region of southern Sudan, Josephine was kidnapped at the age of seven, sold into slavery and given the name Bakhita, which means fortunate. She was re-sold several times, finally in 1883 to Callisto Legnani, Italian consul in Khartoum, Sudan.

Two years later he took Josephine to Italy and gave her to his friend Augusto Michieli. Bakhita became babysitter to Mimmina Michieli, whom she accompanied to Venice's Institute of the Catechumens, run by the Canossian Sisters. While Mimmina was being instructed, Josephine felt drawn to the Catholic Church. She was baptized and confirmed in 1890, taking the name Josephine.

When the Michielis returned from Africa and wanted to take Mimmina and Josephine back with them, the future saint refused to go. During the ensuing court case, the Canossian sisters and the patriarch of Venice intervened on Josephine's behalf. The judge concluded that since slavery was illegal in Italy, she had actually been free since 1885.

Josephine entered the Institute of St. Magdalene of Canossa in 1893 and made her profession three years later. In 1902, she was transferred to the city of Schio (northeast of Verona), where she assisted her religious community through cooking, sewing, embroidery and welcoming visitors at the door. She soon became well loved by the children attending the sisters' school and the local citizens. She once said, "Be good, love the Lord, pray for those who do not know Him. What a great grace it is to know God!"

The first steps toward her beatification began in 1959. She was beatified in 1992 and canonized eight years later.

=== Other Branches of Canossa Schools in the Philippines ===
1. Canossa College, San Pablo City

2. Canossa Academy - Calamba Laguna, Inc.

3. Canossa Academy - Lipa City, Inc.

4. Canossa Kindergarten and Day Care Center - Cagayan de Oro City (Only for Kindergartens)

All Focusing in Making Jesus Known and Loved
