= Philippine Senate Committee on Higher, Technical and Vocational Education =

Standing committee of the Senate of the Philippines

Committee on Higher, Technical and Vocational Education
- Senate of the Philippines; 20th Congress

History
- New session started: July 28, 2025

Leadership
- Chair: Loren Legarda (NPC)

Structure
- Seats: 15
- Political groups: Majority (9): NPC (3); Nacionalista (2); Akbayan (1); KANP (1); Liberal (1); Independent (1); Minority (6): PDP (2); NPC (1); PMP (1); Independent (2)

The Philippine Senate Committee on Higher, Technical and Vocational Education is a standing committee of the Senate of the Philippines.

This committee, along with the Committee on Basic Education, Arts and Culture, was formed after the Committee on Education, Arts and Culture was split into two on July 31, 2019, pursuant to Senate Resolution No. 6 of the 18th Congress.

== Jurisdiction ==
According to the Rules of the Senate, the committee handles all matters relating to:

- Post-secondary and tertiary education
- Technical education
- Distance education
- Vocational education
- Commission on Higher Education
- Technical Education and Skills Development Authority
- Students and teachers’ welfare
- Centers of excellence
- Scholarships, grants, subsidies and incentives to deserving students

== Members, 20th Congress ==
Based on the Rules of the Senate, the Senate Committee on Higher, Technical and Vocational Education has 15 members.

| Position | Member | Party |
|---|---|---|
| Chairperson | Loren Legarda | NPC |
| Vice Chairpersons | Bam Aquino | KANP |
| Vice Chairpersons | Win Gatchalian | NPC |
| Deputy Majority Leaders | JV Ejercito | NPC |
| Deputy Majority Leaders | Risa Hontiveros | Akbayan |
| Members for the Majority | Pia Cayetano | Nacionalista |
| Members for the Majority | Kiko Pangilinan | Liberal |
| Members for the Majority | Raffy Tulfo | Independent |
| Members for the Majority | Mark Villar | Nacionalista |
| Deputy Minority Leaders | Rodante Marcoleta | Independent |
| Deputy Minority Leaders | Joel Villanueva | Independent |
| Members for the Minority | Ronald dela Rosa | PDP |
| Members for the Minority | Francis Escudero | NPC |
| Members for the Minority | Jinggoy Estrada | PMP |
| Members for the Minority | Bong Go | PDP |

Ex officio members:

- Senate President pro tempore Panfilo Lacson
- Majority Floor Leader Juan Miguel Zubiri
- Minority Floor Leader Alan Peter Cayetano

Committee secretary: Cleah D. Nava

== Historical membership rosters ==
=== 19th Congress ===
| Position | Member | Party |
|---|---|---|
| Chairperson | Alan Peter Cayetano | Independent |
| Vice Chairperson | Win Gatchalian | NPC |
| Members for the Majority | JV Ejercito | NPC |
| Members for the Majority | Mark Villar | Nacionalista |
| Members for the Majority | Nancy Binay | UNA |
| Members for the Majority | Pia Cayetano | Nacionalista |
| Members for the Majority | Ronald dela Rosa | PDP–Laban |
| Members for the Majority | Bong Go | PDP–Laban |
| Members for the Majority | Loren Legarda | NPC |
| Members for the Majority | Imee Marcos | Nacionalista |
| Members for the Majority | Bong Revilla | Lakas |
| Members for the Majority | Raffy Tulfo | Independent |
| Members for the Majority | Joel Villanueva | Independent |
| Members for the Majority | Cynthia Villar | Nacionalista |
| Member for the Minority | Risa Hontiveros | Akbayan |

Committee secretary: Charlyne Claire Fuentes-Olay

=== 18th Congress ===
| Position | Member | Party |
|---|---|---|
| Chairperson | Joel Villanueva | CIBAC |
| Vice Chairperson | Win Gatchalian | NPC |
| Members for the Majority | Nancy Binay | UNA |
| Members for the Majority | Sonny Angara | LDP |
| Members for the Majority | Bong Go | PDP–Laban |
| Members for the Majority | Pia Cayetano | Nacionalista |
| Members for the Majority | Bong Revilla | Lakas |
| Members for the Majority | Grace Poe | Independent |
| Members for the Majority | Panfilo Lacson | Independent |
| Members for the Majority | Cynthia Villar | Nacionalista |
| Members for the Majority | Lito Lapid | NPC |
| Members for the Majority | Richard Gordon | Independent |
| Members for the Minority | Risa Hontiveros | Akbayan |
| Members for the Minority | Leila de Lima | Liberal |
| Members for the Minority | Francis Pangilinan | Liberal |

Committee secretary: Joey M. Tunac

== See also ==
- List of Philippine Senate committees
