= Philippine Senate Committee on Basic Education =

Standing committee of the Senate of the Philippines

Committee on Basic Education
- Senate of the Philippines; 20th Congress

History
- New session started: July 28, 2025

Leadership
- Chair: Bam Aquino, KANP since June 3, 2026
- Seats: 15

The Philippine Senate Committee on Basic Education is a standing committee of the Senate of the Philippines.

This committee was formed after the Committee on Basic Education, Arts and Culture was divided into two in 2022, pursuant to Senate Resolution No. 93 of the 19th Congress.

== Jurisdiction ==
According to the Rules of the Senate, the committee handles all matters relating to:

- Early childhood care and education
- Pre-school, kindergarten, elementary and secondary education
- Science high schools except the Philippine Science High School System
- Sports high schools
- Teachers and students welfare
- Teacher education and competency
- Non-formal, informal, indigenous learning systems,
- Special needs education and community adult education
- Inclusive education, scholarships, grants, subsidies and incentives to deserving students
- The national language
- The establishment and maintenance of libraries

== House Counterpart ==
The jurisdiction of the Senate Committee on Basic Education has a counterpart in the House of Representatives:

- House Committee on Basic Education and Culture

== Members, 20th Congress ==
Based on the Rules of the Senate, the Senate Committee on Basic Education has 15 members. On May 11, 2026, during the ouster of Senate President Tito Sotto, the positions within the Basic Education Committee were declared vacant alongside all other Senate committees.

As of May 18, 2026
Majority	Minority
Loren Legarda (NPC), Chair (Note: Ex officio member as Senate President pro tempore; not counted in the membership.)	Vacant

Ex officio members:

- Acting Majority Floor Leader Vacant
- Minority Floor Leader Vacant

== Historical membership rosters ==
=== 20th Congress ===
July 29, 2025 – May 11, 2026
Majority	Minority
Bam Aquino (KANP), Chair	Rodante Marcoleta (Independent), Deputy Minority Leader
Win Gatchalian (NPC), Vice Chair	Ronald dela Rosa (PDP)
Raffy Tulfo (Independent), Vice Chair	Jinggoy Estrada (PMP)
JV Ejercito (NPC), Deputy Majority Leader	Bong Go (PDP)
Risa Hontiveros (Akbayan), Deputy Majority Leader	Imee Marcos (Nacionalista)
Pia Cayetano (Nacionalista)	Robin Padilla (PDP)
Lito Lapid (NPC)	
Loren Legarda (NPC)	
Kiko Pangilinan (Liberal)	

Ex officio members:

- Senate President pro tempore Panfilo Lacson
- Majority Floor Leader Juan Miguel Zubiri
- Minority Floor Leader Alan Peter Cayetano

Committee secretary: Beatrice Anne M. Vidamo

=== 19th Congress ===
until June 30, 2025
Majority	Minority
Win Gatchalian (NPC), Chair	Risa Hontiveros (Akbayan), Deputy Minority Leader
JV Ejercito (NPC), Deputy Majority Leader	
Mark Villar (Nacionalista), Deputy Majority Leader	
Nancy Binay (UNA)	
Pia Cayetano (Nacionalista)	
Ronald dela Rosa (PDP)	
Bong Go (PDP)	
Loren Legarda (NPC)	
Imee Marcos (Nacionalista)	
Robin Padilla (PDP)	
Grace Poe (Independent)	
Raffy Tulfo (Independent)	
Joel Villanueva (Independent)	
Juan Miguel Zubiri (Independent)	

Ex officio members:

- Senate President pro tempore Loren Legarda (July 25, 2022 – May 20, 2024)
- Senate President pro tempore Jinggoy Estrada (May 20, 2024 – June 30, 2025)
- Majority Floor Leader Joel Villanueva (July 25, 2022 – May 20, 2024)
- Majority Floor Leader Francis Tolentino (May 20, 2024 – June 30, 2025)
- Minority Floor Leader Koko Pimentel

Committee secretary: Hazel Ross P. Villarba

== See also ==
- List of Philippine Senate committees
