= Philippine Senate Committee on Culture and the Arts =

Standing committee of the Senate of the Philippines

Committee on Culture and the Arts
- Senate of the Philippines; 20th Congress

History
- New session started: July 28, 2025

Leadership
- Chair: Loren Legarda (NPC) since July 30, 2025

The Philippine Senate Committee on Culture and the Arts is a standing committee of the Senate of the Philippines.

This committee was formed after the Committee on Basic Education, Arts and Culture was divided into two in 2022, pursuant to Senate Resolution No. 93 of the 19th Congress.

== Jurisdiction ==
According to the Rules of the Senate, the committee handles all matters relating to:

- The establishment and maintenance of museums, shrines, monuments, and other historical sites and edifices
- Initiatives in fostering artistic practices and innovations in a range of platforms for presentation
- Support for scholarship, curatorship and dissemination of knowledge in arts and culture
- Training programs and cultural and artistic programs of international institutions and organizations operating in the Philippines, such as the UNESCO
- The preservation, enrichment and evolution of Filipino arts and culture, built and intangible, and in both traditional and contemporary forms

== House Counterpart ==
The jurisdiction of the Senate Committee on Culture and the Arts has a counterpart in the House of Representatives:

- House Committee on Basic Education and Culture

== Members, 20th Congress ==
Based on the Rules of the Senate, the Senate Committee on Culture and the Arts has 9 members.

Position	Member	Party
Chairperson	Loren Legarda	NPC
Vice Chairperson	Juan Miguel Zubiri (Note: Ex officio member as Senate majority leader; not counted in the membership.)	Independent
Deputy Majority Leaders	JV Ejercito	NPC
Deputy Majority Leaders	Risa Hontiveros	Akbayan
Members for the Majority	Bam Aquino	KANP
Members for the Majority	Pia Cayetano	Nacionalista
Members for the Majority	Win Gatchalian	NPC
Deputy Minority Leaders	Rodante Marcoleta	Independent
Deputy Minority Leaders	Joel Villanueva	Independent
Member for the Minority	Robin Padilla	PDP

Ex officio members:

- Senate President pro tempore Panfilo Lacson
- Minority Floor Leader Alan Peter Cayetano

Committee secretary: Lyka Ranelle Dela Cruz-Yap

== Historical membership rosters ==
=== 19th Congress ===
Position	Member	Party
Chairperson	Loren Legarda	NPC
Vice Chairperson	Nancy Binay	UNA
Members for the Majority	JV Ejercito	NPC
Members for the Majority	Mark Villar	Nacionalista
Members for the Majority	Win Gatchalian	NPC
Members for the Majority	Robin Padilla	PDP
Members for the Majority	Grace Poe	Independent
Members for the Majority	Migz Zubiri	Independent
Member for the Minority	Risa Hontiveros	Akbayan

Committee secretary: Joey M. Tunac

== See also ==
- List of Philippine Senate committees
