= Philippine Senate Committee on Basic Education, Arts and Culture =

Former standing committee of the Senate of the Philippines

Committee on Basic Education, Arts and Culture

History
- Disbanded: 2022
- Succeeded by: Committee on Basic Education; Committee on Culture and the Arts

The Philippine Senate Committee on Basic Education, Arts and Culture was a standing committee of the Senate of the Philippines until it was disbanded during the 19th Congress of the Philippines.

This committee, along with the Committee on Higher, Technical and Vocational Education, was formed after the Committee on Education, Arts and Culture was split into two on July 31, 2019, pursuant to Senate Resolution No. 6 of the 18th Congress. The committee was then divided during the 19th Congress into the Committee on Basic Education and Committee on Arts and Culture (later renamed Culture and the Arts).

== Jurisdiction ==
According to the Rules of the Senate, the committee handled all matters relating to:

- Early childhood care and education, pre-school, kindergarten, primary and secondary education
- Science high schools except the Philippine Science High School System
- Teachers' and students' welfare, teacher education and competency
- Non-formal, informal, indigenous learning systems, special education and community adult education
- Inclusive education, scholarships, grants, subsidies and incentives to deserving students
- The national language
- The Department of Education
- Establishment and maintenance of libraries, museums, shrines, monuments, and other historical sites and edifices
- Training programs and cultural and artistic programs of international institutions and organizations operating in the Philippines, such as the UNESCO
- Preservation, enrichment and evolution of Filipino arts and culture

== Historical membership rosters ==
=== 18th Congress ===
| Position | Member | Party |
|---|---|---|
| Chairperson | Win Gatchalian | NPC |
| Vice Chairperson | Joel Villanueva | CIBAC |
| Members for the Majority | Nancy Binay | UNA |
| Members for the Majority | Pia Cayetano | Nacionalista |
| Members for the Majority | Bong Go | PDP–Laban |
| Members for the Majority | Panfilo Lacson | Independent |
| Members for the Majority | Lito Lapid | NPC |
| Members for the Majority | Imee Marcos | Nacionalista |
| Members for the Majority | Koko Pimentel | PDP–Laban |
| Members for the Majority | Grace Poe | Independent |
| Members for the Majority | Bong Revilla | Lakas |
| Members for the Majority | Richard Gordon | Independent |
| Members for the Minority | Leila de Lima | Liberal |
| Members for the Minority | Risa Hontiveros | Akbayan |
| Members for the Minority | Francis Pangilinan | Liberal |

Committee secretary: Joey M. Tunac

=== 17th Congress ===
| Position | Member | Party |
|---|---|---|
| Chairperson | Francis Escudero | NPC |
| Vice Chairperson | Win Gatchalian | NPC |

==== Chairperson ====
- Bam Aquino (Note: Removed on February 27, 2017.) (Liberal)

=== 16th Congress ===
| Position | Member | Party |
|---|---|---|
| Chairperson | Pia Cayetano | Nacionalista |
| Vice Chairperson | Serge Osmeña | Independent |

=== 15th Congress ===
| Position | Member | Party |
|---|---|---|
| Chairperson | Edgardo Angara | LDP |

=== 14th Congress ===
| Position | Member | Party |
|---|---|---|
| Chairperson | Alan Peter Cayetano | Nacionalista |

=== 13th Congress ===
| Position | Member | Party |
|---|---|---|
| Chairperson | Juan Flavier | Lakas |

=== 12th Congress ===
| Position | Member | Party |
|---|---|---|
| Acting Chairperson | Kiko Pangilinan | Liberal |

==== Chairperson ====
- Rene Cayetano (Note: Died on June 25, 2003.) (Lakas–NUCD–UMDP)

=== 11th Congress ===
| Position | Member | Party |
|---|---|---|
| Chairperson | Tessie Aquino-Oreta | LDP |

=== 10th Congress ===
| Position | Member | Party |
|---|---|---|
| Chairperson | Blas Ople | LDP |

=== 9th Congress ===
| Position | Member | Party |
|---|---|---|
| Chairperson | Leticia Ramos-Shahani | Lakas |
| Vice Chairperson | Raul S. Roco | LDP |

== See also ==
- List of Philippine Senate committees
