= Philippine Senate Committee on Foreign Relations =

Standing committee of the Senate of the Philippines

Committee on Foreign Relations
- Senate of the Philippines; 20th Congress

History
- New session started: July 28, 2025

Leadership
- Chair: Erwin Tulfo (Lakas) since February 2, 2026

Structure
- Seats: 17
- Political groups: Majority (11): NPC (4); Nacionalista (3); Akbayan (1); KANP (1); Lakas (1); Independent (1); Minority (6): PDP (3); NPC (1); PMP (1); Independent (1)

The Philippine Senate Committee on Foreign Relations is a standing committee of the Senate of the Philippines.

== Jurisdiction ==
According to the Rules of the Senate, the committee handles all matters relating to:

- Relations of the Philippines with other nations generally
- Diplomatic and consular services
- The Association of Southeast Asian Nations (ASEAN)
- The United Nations Organization and its agencies
- Multi-lateral organizations
- All international agreements, obligations and contracts of the Philippines
- Overseas Filipinos

== Members, 20th Congress ==
Based on the Rules of the Senate, the Senate Committee on Foreign Relations has 17 members.

Position	Member	Party
Chairperson	Erwin Tulfo	Lakas
Vice Chairperson	Loren Legarda	NPC
Deputy Majority Leaders	JV Ejercito	NPC
Deputy Majority Leaders	Risa Hontiveros	Akbayan
Members for the Majority	Bam Aquino	KANP
Members for the Majority	Pia Cayetano	Nacionalista
Members for the Majority	Win Gatchalian	NPC
Members for the Majority	Lito Lapid	NPC
Members for the Majority	Raffy Tulfo	Independent
Members for the Majority	Camille Villar	Nacionalista
Members for the Majority	Mark Villar	Nacionalista
Deputy Minority Leader	Joel Villanueva	Independent
Members for the Minority	Ronald dela Rosa	PDP
Members for the Minority	Francis Escudero	NPC
Members for the Minority	Jinggoy Estrada	PMP
Members for the Minority	Bong Go	PDP
Members for the Minority	Robin Padilla	PDP

Ex officio members:

- Senate President pro tempore Panfilo Lacson
- Majority Floor Leader Juan Miguel Zubiri
- Minority Floor Leader Alan Peter Cayetano

Committee secretary: Dir. Putli Suharni S. Candao

== Historical membership rosters ==
=== 19th Congress ===
Position	Member	Party
Chairperson	Imee Marcos	Nacionalista
Vice Chairperson	None	
Members for the Majority	JV Ejercito	NPC
Members for the Majority	Mark Villar	Nacionalista
Members for the Majority	Nancy Binay	UNA
Members for the Majority	Alan Peter Cayetano	Independent
Members for the Majority	Pia Cayetano	Nacionalista
Members for the Majority	Ronald dela Rosa	PDP–Laban
Members for the Majority	Win Gatchalian	NPC
Members for the Majority	Bong Go	PDP–Laban
Members for the Majority	Lito Lapid	NPC
Members for the Majority	Loren Legarda	NPC
Members for the Majority	Robin Padilla	PDP–Laban
Members for the Majority	Grace Poe	Independent
Members for the Majority	Bong Revilla	Lakas
Members for the Majority	Cynthia Villar	Nacionalista
Members for the Majority	Juan Miguel Zubiri	Independent
Member for the Minority	Risa Hontiveros	Akbayan

Committee secretary: Dana Paula B. Mendiola-Alberto

=== 18th Congress ===
Position	Member	Party
Chairperson	Koko Pimentel	PDP–Laban
Vice Chairpersons	Richard Gordon	Independent
Vice Chairpersons	Francis Tolentino	PDP–Laban
Vice Chairpersons	Ronald dela Rosa	PDP–Laban
Vice Chairpersons	Manny Pacquiao	PDP–Laban
Members for the Majority	Bong Go	PDP–Laban
Members for the Majority	Panfilo Lacson	Independent
Members for the Majority	Lito Lapid	NPC
Members for the Majority	Joel Villanueva	CIBAC
Members for the Majority	Bong Revilla	Lakas
Members for the Majority	Grace Poe	Independent
Members for the Majority	Win Gatchalian	NPC
Members for the Minority	Risa Hontiveros	Akbayan
Members for the Minority	Francis Pangilinan	Liberal
Members for the Minority	Leila de Lima	Liberal

Committee secretary: Putli Suharni C. Samanodi-Candao

== See also ==
- List of Philippine Senate committees
