= Cayetano family =

Filipino political family

- Political family
- Country: Philippines
- Current region: Taguig
- Origin: Pangasinan

The Cayetano family is a political family in the Philippines whose patriarch is Rene Cayetano. Most members with political positions hail from Taguig, Metro Manila.

== Background ==
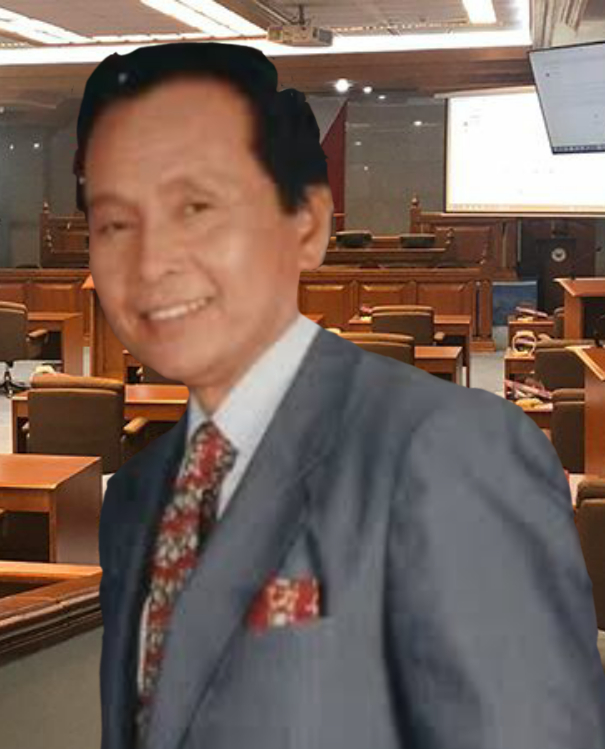
Rene Cayetano (1934–2003).

The Cayetano family can be traced to Pangasinan. This link was established when President Fidel V. Ramos introduced the patriarch Rene Cayetano to Hawaii Governor Ben Cayetano whose' father's hometown is Urdaneta during the visit of the American governor to the Philippines in 1997. According to Alan Peter Cayetano, he has limited family members in the Visayas and Mindanao.

Rene Cayetano was a Senator and had five siblings; three grew up in Pateros before emigrating abroad. In 2016, the Cayetano family organized a reunion event in San Carlos, Pangasinan which was attended by 200 kin residing in the city and the neighboring municipality of Basista.

The Cayetanos established a political presence in Taguig and the Taguig–Pateros congressional districts. The Cayetanos hold the mayoralty of Taguig since 2010 with Alan Peter's wife Lani Cayetano as the family's first Taguig mayor. Siblings Alan Peter and Pia Cayetano serve as senators.
