= Philippine Senate Committee on Sustainable Development Goals, Innovation and Futures Thinking =

Standing committee of the Senate of the Philippines

Committee on Sustainable Development Goals, Innovation and Futures Thinking
- Senate of the Philippines; 20th Congress

History
- New session started: July 28, 2025

Leadership
- Chair: Pia Cayetano (Nacionalista) since July 29, 2025

Structure
- Seats: 9
- Political groups: Majority (6): NPC (3); Nacionalista (2); Akbayan (1); Minority (3): PDP (1); Independent (2)

The Philippine Senate Committee on Sustainable Development Goals, Innovation and Futures Thinking is a standing committee of the Senate of the Philippines.

This committee was created during the 18th Congress on September 3, 2019, through Senate Resolution No. 9.

== Jurisdiction ==
According to the Rules of the Senate, the committee handles all matters relating to the United Nations 2030 Agenda for Sustainable Development and the assessment of the country's performance in attaining these development goals.

== Members, 20th Congress ==
Based on the Rules of the Senate, the Senate Committee on Sustainable Development Goals, Innovation and Futures Thinking has 9 members.

Position	Member	Party
Chairperson	Pia Cayetano	Nacionalista
Vice Chairperson	Camille Villar	Nacionalista
Deputy Majority Leaders	JV Ejercito	NPC
Deputy Majority Leaders	Risa Hontiveros	Akbayan
Members for the Majority	Lito Lapid	NPC
Members for the Majority	Loren Legarda	NPC
Deputy Minority Leaders	Rodante Marcoleta	Independent
Deputy Minority Leaders	Joel Villanueva	Independent
Member for the Minority	Robin Padilla	PDP

Ex officio members:

- Senate President pro tempore Panfilo Lacson
- Majority Floor Leader Juan Miguel Zubiri
- Minority Floor Leader Alan Peter Cayetano

Committee secretary: Charlyne Claire Fuentes-Olay

== Historical membership rosters ==
=== 18th Congress ===
Position	Member	Party
Chairperson	Pia Cayetano	Nacionalista
Vice Chairperson	none	
Members for the Majority	Bong Go	PDP–Laban
Members for the Majority	Joel Villanueva	CIBAC
Members for the Majority	Sonny Angara	LDP
Members for the Majority	Cynthia Villar	Nacionalista
Members for the Majority	Manny Pacquiao	PDP–Laban
Members for the Majority	Lito Lapid	NPC
Members for the Majority	Francis Tolentino	PDP–Laban
Members for the Majority	Nancy Binay	UNA
Members for the Majority	Grace Poe	Independent
Members for the Majority	Ronald dela Rosa	PDP–Laban
Members for the Majority	Bong Revilla	Lakas
Members for the Minority	Risa Hontiveros	Akbayan
Members for the Minority	Leila de Lima	Liberal
Members for the Minority	Francis Pangilinan	Liberal

Committee secretary: Ma. Lourdes A. Juan-Alzate / Eduardo C. Garvida

== See also ==
- List of Philippine Senate committees
