= 2016 Assembly election =

Eight Assembly elections took place in 2016:

== England ==
- 2016 London Assembly election

== India ==
- 2016 Assam Legislative Assembly election
- 2016 West Bengal Legislative Assembly election
- 2016 Kerala Legislative Assembly election
- 2016 Puducherry Legislative Assembly election
- 2016 Tamil Nadu Legislative Assembly election

== Northern Ireland ==
- 2016 Northern Ireland Assembly election

== Wales ==
- 2016 National Assembly for Wales election

== See also ==
- List of elections in 2016
