= Philippine Senate Committee on Ways and Means =

Standing committee of the Senate of the Philippines

Committee on Ways and Means
- Senate of the Philippines; 20th Congress

History
- New session started: July 28, 2025

Leadership
- Chair: Pia Cayetano (Nacionalista) since July 29, 2025

Structure
- Seats: 15
- Political groups: Majority (9): NPC (4); Nacionalista (2); Akbayan (1); KANP (1); Independent (1); Minority (6): Nacionalista (1); NPC (1); PDP (1); PMP (1); Independent (2)

The Philippine Senate Committee on Ways and Means is a standing committee of the Senate of the Philippines.

== Jurisdiction ==
According to the Rules of the Senate, the committee handles all matters relating to:

- Revenue, generally
- Taxes and fees
- Tariffs
- Loans and other sources and forms of revenue

== Members, 20th Congress ==
Based on the Rules of the Senate, the Senate Committee on Ways and Means has 15 members.

Position	Member	Party
Chairperson	Pia Cayetano	Nacionalista
Vice Chairperson	Win Gatchalian	NPC
Deputy Majority Leaders	JV Ejercito	NPC
Deputy Majority Leaders	Risa Hontiveros	Akbayan
Members for the Majority	Bam Aquino	KANP
Members for the Majority	Lito Lapid	NPC
Members for the Majority	Loren Legarda	NPC
Members for the Majority	Raffy Tulfo	Independent
Members for the Majority	Camille Villar	Nacionalista
Deputy Minority Leaders	Rodante Marcoleta	Independent
Deputy Minority Leaders	Joel Villanueva	Independent
Members for the Minority	Francis Escudero	NPC
Members for the Minority	Jinggoy Estrada	PMP
Members for the Minority	Bong Go	PDP
Members for the Minority	Imee Marcos	Nacionalista

Ex officio members:

- Senate President pro tempore Panfilo Lacson
- Majority Floor Leader Juan Miguel Zubiri
- Minority Floor Leader Alan Peter Cayetano

Committee secretary: Atty. Rodelio T. Dascil, MNSA

== Historical membership rosters ==
=== 18th Congress ===
Position	Member	Party
Chairperson	Pia Cayetano	Nacionalista
Vice Chairperson	Sonny Angara	LDP
Members for the Majority	Bong Go	PDP–Laban
Members for the Majority	Panfilo Lacson	Independent
Members for the Majority	Richard Gordon	Independent
Members for the Majority	Win Gatchalian	NPC
Members for the Majority	Lito Lapid	NPC
Members for the Majority	Ronald dela Rosa	PDP–Laban
Members for the Majority	Manny Pacquiao	PDP–Laban
Members for the Majority	Grace Poe	Independent
Members for the Majority	Bong Revilla	Lakas
Members for the Majority	Imee Marcos	Nacionalista
Members for the Minority	Francis Pangilinan	Liberal
Members for the Minority	Risa Hontiveros	Akbayan
Members for the Minority	Leila de Lima	Liberal

Committee secretary: Senate Tax Study and Research Office

== See also ==
- List of Philippine Senate committees
