= Philippine Senate Committee on Banks, Financial Institutions and Currencies =

Standing committee of the Senate of the Philippines

Committee on Banks, Financial Institutions and Currencies
- Senate of the Philippines; 20th Congress

History
- New session started: July 28, 2025

Leadership
- Chair: Mark Villar, Nacionalista Party since May 11, 2026
- Seats: 11

The Philippine Senate Committee on Banks, Financial Institutions and Currencies is a standing committee of the Senate of the Philippines.

== Jurisdiction ==
According to the Rules of the Senate, the committee handles all matters relating to:

- Banks
- Financial institutions
- Government and private currencies
- Capital markets
- Mutual funds
- Securitization
- Coinage
- Circulation of money

== Members, 20th Congress ==
Based on the Rules of the Senate, the Senate Committee on Banks, Financial Institutions and Currencies has 11 members.

As of May 11, 2026
Majority	Minority
To be determined

Ex officio members:

- Senate President pro tempore Tito Sotto
- Majority Floor Leader Migz Zubiri
- Minority Floor Leader Alan Peter Cayetano

Committee secretary: Paolo Dominic G. Macariola

== Historical membership rosters ==
=== 20th Congress ===
September 15, 2025 – May 11, 2026
Majority	Minority
JV Ejercito (NPC), Deputy Majority Leader	Joel Villanueva (Independent), Chair
Risa Hontiveros (Akbayan), Deputy Majority Leader	Alan Peter Cayetano (Independent), Vice Chair (Note: Ex officio member as Senate minority floor leader; not counted in the membership.)
Win Gatchalian (NPC)	Rodante Marcoleta (Independent), Deputy Minority Leader
Loren Legarda (NPC)	Francis Escudero (NPC)
Kiko Pangilinan (Liberal)	Bong Go (PDP)
Camille Villar (Nacionalista)	
Mark Villar (Nacionalista)	

Ex officio members:

- Senate President pro tempore Panfilo Lacson
- Majority Floor Leader Juan Miguel Zubiri

Committee secretary: Paolo Dominic G. Macariola

=== 19th Congress ===
August 2, 2022 – June 30, 2025
Majority	Minority
Mark Villar (Nacionalista), Chair	Risa Hontiveros (Akbayan), Deputy Minority Leader
Win Gatchalian (NPC), Vice Chair	
JV Ejercito (NPC), Deputy Majority Leader	
Alan Peter Cayetano (Independent)	
Lito Lapid (NPC)	
Loren Legarda (NPC)	
Imee Marcos (Nacionalista)	
Robin Padilla (PDP)	
Grace Poe (Independent)	
Cynthia Villar (Nacionalista)	

Ex officio members:

- Senate President pro tempore Loren Legarda (July 25, 2022 – May 20, 2024)
- Senate President pro tempore Jinggoy Estrada (May 20, 2024 – June 30, 2025)
- Majority Floor Leader Joel Villanueva (July 25, 2022 – May 20, 2024)
- Majority Floor Leader Francis Tolentino (May 20, 2024 – June 30, 2025)
- Minority Floor Leader Koko Pimentel

Committee secretary: Mary Ann T. Salada

=== 18th Congress ===
July 24, 2019 – June 30, 2022
Majority	Minority
Grace Poe (Independent), Chair	Risa Hontiveros (Akbayan)
Sonny Angara (LDP), Vice Chair	Kiko Pangilinan (Liberal)
Win Gatchalian (NPC), Vice Chair	
Panfilo Lacson (Independent)	
Bong Go (PDP–Laban)	
Nancy Binay (UNA)	
Lito Lapid (NPC)	

Ex officio members:

- Senate President pro tempore Ralph Recto
- Majority Floor Leader Juan Miguel Zubiri
- Minority Floor Leader Franklin Drilon

Committee secretary: Harold Ian V. Bartolome

== See also ==
- List of Philippine Senate committees
