= Taguig–Pateros's at-large congressional district =

Congressional district of the Philippines

Taguig–Pateros's at-large congressional district was a congressional district for the combined independent local government units of Pateros and Taguig in the Philippines. It was represented in the House of Representatives from 1987 up to its division in 2007. The district was apportioned in 1987, pursuant to the constitution ratified that year, giving the two municipalities their own joint district after having been grouped with Muntinlupa from 1984 to 1986. The district was first represented by Dante Tiñga, followed by its last representative Alan Peter Cayetano. The district was divided into two districts following Taguig's conversion into a highly urbanized city on December 8, 2004. Electing separate representatives was later administered in 2007.

== Representation history ==
#	Image	Member	Term of office		Congress	Party	Electoral history
#	Image	Member	Start	End	Congress	Party	Electoral history
=== Taguig–Pateros's at-large district for the House of Representatives of the Philippines ===
District created February 2, 1987 from Taguig–Pateros–Muntinlupa district.
1		Dante O. Tiñga	June 30, 1987	June 30, 1998	8th	PDP-Laban (Lakas ng Bansa)	Elected in 1987.
1		Dante O. Tiñga	June 30, 1987	June 30, 1998	9th	LDP	Re-elected in 1992.
1		Dante O. Tiñga	June 30, 1987	June 30, 1998	10th	Lakas	Re-elected in 1995.
2		Alan Peter Cayetano	June 30, 1998	June 30, 2007	11th	Liberal	Elected in 1998.
2		Alan Peter Cayetano	June 30, 1998	June 30, 2007	12th	Lakas	Re-elected in 2001.
2		Alan Peter Cayetano	June 30, 1998	June 30, 2007	13th	Nacionalista	Re-elected in 2004.
District dissolved into Taguig–Pateros's 1st and 2nd districts.

== See also ==
- Legislative districts of Pateros–Taguig
