= Cayetano in Action with Boy Abunda =

Philippine television talk show

- Title card
- Genre: Public affairs; Late-night talk show
- Presented by: Alan Peter Cayetano; Pia Cayetano; Boy Abunda
- Country of origin: Philippines
- Original language: Tagalog

Production
- Camera setup: Multiple-camera setup
- Running time: 45–60 minutes
- Production company: Infinite Monkeys

Original release
- Network: GMA Network
- Release: February 5, 2023 – January 11, 2026

Cayetano in Action with Boy Abunda is a Philippine television public affairs talk show broadcast by GMA Network. It is hosted by Alan Peter Cayetano, Pia Cayetano and Boy Abunda. It premiered on February 5, 2023, on the network's Sunday Grande sa Gabi line up.

The show is streaming online on YouTube.

== Premise ==
Inspired by the radio and television show Compañero y Compañera – Alan Peter Cayetano, Pia Cayetano and Boy Abunda will give legal counsel to people in their own perspectives. It is filmed with a live studio audience.

== Hosts ==
Hosts

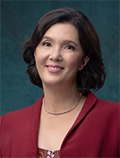
Pia Cayetano

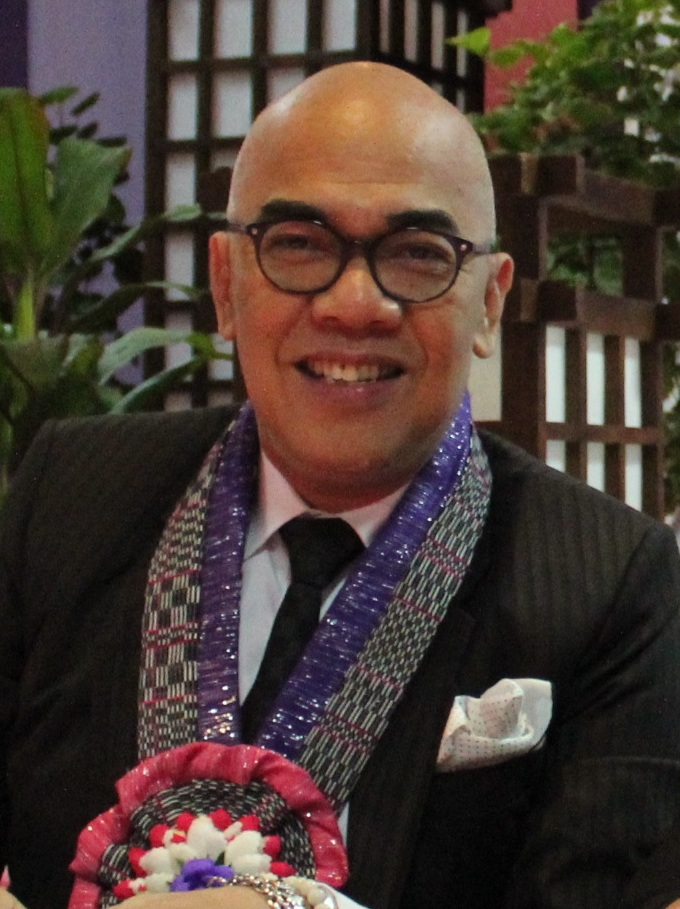
Boy Abunda

- Alan Peter Cayetano
- Pia Cayetano
- Boy Abunda

== Segments ==
- Alan, Pia, Pik
- Case 2 Face
- Mari-Team
- Pachinko
- Payong Kapatid
- Salamat

== Accolades ==
Accolades received by Cayetano in Action with Boy Abunda
| Year | Award | Category | Recipient | Result | Ref. |
|---|---|---|---|---|---|
| 2023 | 45th Catholic Mass Media Awards | Best Talk Show | Cayetano in Action with Boy Abunda | Nominated | |
| 2025 | 38th PMPC Star Awards for Television | Best Public Affairs Program | Cayetano in Action with Boy Abunda | Won | |
| 2025 | 38th PMPC Star Awards for Television | Best Public Affairs Program Host | Alan Peter Cayetano Pia Cayetano Boy Abunda | Won | |
| 2025 | 37th PMPC Star Awards for Television | Best Public Affairs Program | Cayetano in Action with Boy Abunda | Won | |
| 2025 | 37th PMPC Star Awards for Television | Best Public Affairs Program Host | Alan Peter Cayetano Pia Cayetano Boy Abunda | Won | |
