= Philippine House Committee on Basic Education and Culture =

Standing committee of the House of Representatives of the Philippines

Committee on Basic Education and Culture
- 20th Congress

History
- New session started: July 28, 2025

Leadership
- Chair: Roman Romulo, NPC since July 30, 2025
- Minority Leader: Vacant since June 30, 2025

Website
- Committee on Basic Education and Culture

The Philippine House Committee on Basic Education and Culture (or House Basic Education and Culture Committee) is a standing committee of the Philippine House of Representatives.

== Jurisdiction ==
As prescribed by House Rules, the committee's jurisdiction includes the following:

- Alternative learning systems and community adult education
- Libraries and museums
- National language
- Pre-school, elementary and secondary education
- Preservation and enrichment of Filipino culture
- Science high schools except the Philippine Science High School System
- Teachers' and students' welfare

== Senate Counterparts ==
The jurisdiction of the House Committee on Basic Education and Culture has counterparts in the Senate:

- Senate Committee on Basic Education
- Senate Committee on Culture and the Arts

== Members, 20th Congress ==
Position	Member	Constituency	Party
Chairperson	Roman Romulo	Pasig at-large	NPC
Vice Chairpersons	Vacant		
Members for the Majority	Vacant		
Members for the Minority	Vacant		

== Historical membership rosters ==
=== 19th Congress ===
Position	Members	Party	Province/City	District
Chairperson	Roman Romulo	Aksyon	Pasig	Lone
Vice Chairpersons	Maria Fe Abunda	Lakas–CMD	Eastern Samar	At-large
Vice Chairpersons	Jose Aquino II	Lakas–CMD	Agusan del Norte	1st
Vice Chairpersons	Carl Cari	Lakas–CMD	Leyte	5th
Vice Chairpersons	Marie Bernadette G. Escudero	NPC	Sorsogon	1st
Vice Chairpersons	Mohamad P. Paglas	Lakas–CMD	Maguindanao del Sur	At-large
Vice Chairpersons	Rosemarie C. Panotes	Lakas–CMD	Camarines Norte	2nd
Vice Chairpersons	Crispin Diego Remulla	NUP	Cavite	7th
Vice Chairpersons	Irene Gay Saulog	Kalinga	Party-list	
Members for the Majority	Vincent Garcia	Lakas–CMD	Davao City	2nd
Members for the Majority	Romeo Acop	NUP	Antipolo	2nd
Members for the Majority	Ian Amatong	Liberal	Zamboanga del Norte	3rd
Members for the Majority	Mercedes Alvarez-Lansang	NPC	Negros Occidental	6th
Members for the Majority	Alfel Bascug	NUP	Agusan del Sur	1st
Members for the Majority	Fernando Cabredo	NUP	Albay	3rd
Members for the Majority	Peter John Calderon	NPC	Cebu	7th
Members for the Majority	Cynthia Chan	Lakas–CMD	Lapu-Lapu City	At-large
Members for the Majority	Ma. Victoria Co-Pilar	NUP	Quezon City	6th
Members for the Majority	Jaime Cojuangco	NPC	Tarlac	1st
Members for the Majority	Maria Theresa Collantes	NPC	Batangas	3rd
Members for the Majority	Dale Corvera	Lakas–CMD	Agusan del Norte	2nd
Members for the Majority	Luisa Cuaresma	UNA	Nueva Vizcaya	At-large
Members for the Majority	Maximo Dalog Jr.	Nacionalista	Mountain Province	At-large
Members for the Majority	Christopher de Venecia	Lakas–CMD	Pangasinan	4th
Members for the Majority	Rachel del Mar	NPC	Cebu City	1st
Members for the Majority	Sittie Aminah Dimaporo	Lakas–CMD	Lanao del Norte	2nd
Members for the Majority	Michael John Duavit	NPC	Rizal	1st
Members for the Majority	Alan "Alda" Dujali	Lakas–CMD	Davao del Norte	2nd
Members for the Majority	Yevgeny Emano	Nacionalista	Misamis Oriental	2nd
Members for the Majority	Wilfrido Mark Enverga	NPC	Quezon	1st
Members for the Majority	Danilo Fernandez	NUP	Santa Rosa	At-large
Members for the Majority	Jonathan Keith Flores	Lakas–CMD	Bukidnon	2nd
Members for the Majority	Jaime Fresnedi	Liberal	Muntinlupa	At-large
Members for the Majority	Dante S. Garcia	Lakas–CMD	La Union	2nd
Members for the Majority	Ciriaco "Jun" Gato Jr.	NPC	Batanes	At-large
Members for the Majority	Rhea Mae A. Gullas	Lakas–CMD	Cebu	1st
Members for the Majority	Charisse Anne "Cha" Hernandez	Lakas–CMD	Calamba	At-large
Members for the Majority	Doris E. Maniquiz	Lakas–CMD	Zambales	2nd
Members for the Majority	Rodante Marcoleta	SAGIP	Party-list	
Members for the Majority	Ruth Mariano-Hernandez	Lakas–CMD	Laguna	2nd
Members for the Majority	Peter B. Miguel	Lakas–CMD	South Cotabato	2nd
Members for the Majority	Jernie Jett V. Nisay	Pusong Pinoy	Party-list	
Members for the Majority	Khymer Adan T. Olaso	Nacionalista	Zamboanga City	1st
Members for the Majority	Adolph Edward "Eddiebong" Plaza	NUP	Bulacan	6th
Members for the Majority	Salvador Pleyto	Lakas–CMD	Bukidnon	2nd
Members for the Majority	Stella Quimbo	Lakas–CMD	Marikina	2nd
Members for the Majority	Eduardo R. Rama Jr.	Lakas–CMD	Cebu City	2nd
Members for the Majority	Eulogio R. Rodriguez	PFP	Catanduanes	At-large
Members for the Majority	Laarni Roque	Nacionalista	Bukidnon	4th
Members for the Majority	Ron P. Salo	Kabayan	Party-list	
Members for the Majority	Steve Solon	Lakas–CMD	Sarangani	At-large
Members for the Majority	Josefina Tallado	PDP–Laban	Camarines Norte	1st
Members for the Majority	Keith Micah Tan	NPC	Quezon	4th
Members for the Majority	Leody F. Tarriela	PFP	Occidental Mindoro	At-large
Members for the Majority	Maan Teodoro	NUP	Marikina	1st
Members for the Majority	Miguel Luis Villafuerte	NUP	Camarines Sur	5th
Members for the Majority	Joseph Gilbert Violago	NUP	Nueva Ecija	2nd
Members for the Majority	Maricar Zamora	Lakas–CMD	Davao de Oro	1st
Members for the Minority	Gabriel Bordado	Liberal	Camarines Sur	3rd
Members for the Minority	Bonifacio Bosita	1-Rider	Party-list	
Members for the Minority	Marissa "Del Mar" Magsino	OFW	Party-list	
Members for the Minority	Raoul Manuel	Kabataan	Party-list	
Members for the Minority	Harris Christopher M. Ongchuan	NUP	Northern Samar	2nd
Members for the Minority	Jose Gay Padiernos	GP	Party-list	
Members for the Minority	Reynolds Michael Tan	Lakas–CMD	Samar	2nd

=== 18th Congress ===
Position	Members	Party	Province/City	District
Chairperson	Roman Romulo	Aksyon	Pasig	Lone
Vice Chairpersons	Leo Rafael Cueva	NUP	Negros Occidental	2nd
Vice Chairpersons	Eric Olivarez	PDP–Laban	Parañaque	1st
Vice Chairpersons	Rosanna Vergara	PDP–Laban	Nueva Ecija	3rd
Vice Chairpersons	Jocelyn Fortuno	Nacionalista	Camarines Sur	5th
Vice Chairpersons	Allan Benedict Reyes	PFP	Quezon City	3rd
Vice Chairpersons	Yasser Balindong	Lakas	Lanao del Sur	2nd
Members for the Majority	Narciso Bravo Jr.	NUP	Masbate	1st
Members for the Majority	Alfel Bascug	NUP	Agusan del Sur	1st
Members for the Majority	Luisa Lloren Cuaresma	NUP	Nueva Vizcaya	Lone
Members for the Majority	Wilfredo Caminero	NUP	Cebu	2nd
Members for the Majority	Vicente Veloso III	NUP	Leyte	3rd
Members for the Majority	Micaela Violago	NUP	Nueva Ecija	2nd
Members for the Majority	Juliette Uy	NUP	Misamis Oriental	2nd
Members for the Majority	Elpidio Barzaga Jr.	NUP	Cavite	4th
Members for the Majority	Janice Salimbangon	NUP	Cebu	4th
Members for the Majority	Fernando Cabredo	PDP–Laban	Albay	3rd
Members for the Majority	Carl Nicolas Cari	PFP	Leyte	5th
Members for the Majority	Junie Cua	PDP–Laban	Quirino	Lone
Members for the Majority	Emmarie Ouano-Dizon	PDP–Laban	Cebu	6th
Members for the Majority	Cyrille "Beng" Abueg-Zaldivar	PPP	Palawan	2nd
Members for the Majority	Florida Robes	NUP	San Jose del Monte	Lone
Members for the Majority	Ma. Angelica Amante-Matba	PDP–Laban	Agusan del Norte	2nd
Members for the Majority	Sandra Eriguel	NUP	La Union	2nd
Members for the Majority	Gerardo Espina Jr.	Lakas	Biliran	Lone
Members for the Majority	Maria Fe Abunda	PDP–Laban	Eastern Samar	Lone
Members for the Majority	Henry Villarica	PDP–Laban	Bulacan	4th
Members for the Majority	Carmelo Lazatin II	PDP–Laban	Pampanga	1st
Members for the Majority	Jumel Anthony Espino	PDP–Laban	Pangasinan	2nd
Members for the Majority	Ramon Guico III	Lakas	Pangasinan	5th
Members for the Majority	Jose Tejada	Nacionalista	Cotabato	3rd
Members for the Majority	Kristine Alexie Besas-Tutor	Nacionalista	Bohol	3rd
Members for the Majority	Maximo Dalog Jr.	Nacionalista	Mountain Province	Lone
Members for the Majority	Eugenio Angelo Barba	Nacionalista	Ilocos Norte	2nd
Members for the Majority	Ma. Lourdes Acosta-Alba	Bukidnon Paglaum	Bukidnon	1st
Members for the Majority	Rogelio Neil Roque	Nacionalista	Bukidnon	4th
Members for the Majority	Joseph Sto. Niño Bernos	Nacionalista	Abra	Lone
Members for the Majority	Mark Go	Nacionalista	Baguio	Lone
Members for the Majority	Braeden John Biron	Nacionalista	Iloilo	4th
Members for the Majority	Abdullah Dimaporo	NPC	Lanao del Norte	2nd
Members for the Majority	Elias Bulut Jr.	NPC	Apayao	Lone
Members for the Majority	Victor Yap	NPC	Tarlac	2nd
Members for the Majority	Lorna Bautista-Bandigan	NPC	Davao Occidental	Lone
Members for the Majority	Peter John Calderon	NPC	Cebu	7th
Members for the Majority	Precious Castelo	NPC	Quezon City	2nd
Members for the Majority	Faustino Michael Carlos Dy III	PFP	Isabela	5th
Members for the Majority	John Reynald Tiangco	Partido Navoteño	Navotas	Lone
Members for the Majority	Vincent Franco Frasco	Lakas	Cebu	5th
Members for the Majority	Ramon Nolasco Jr.	NUP	Cagayan	1st
Members for the Majority	Ruth Mariano-Hernandez	Independent	Laguna	2nd
Members for the Majority	Princess Rihan Sakaluran	NUP	Sultan Kudarat	1st
Members for the Majority	Dahlia Loyola	NPC	Cavite	5th
Members for the Majority	Elizaldy Co	Ako Bicol	Party-list	
Members for the Majority	Virgilio Lacson	MANILA TEACHERS	Party-list	
Members for the Majority	Shirlyn Bañas-Nograles	PDP–Laban	South Cotabato	1st
Members for the Majority	Macnell Lusotan	MARINO	Party-list	
Members for the Minority	Ma. Victoria Umali	A TEACHER	Party-list	
Members for the Minority	Irene Gay Saulog	KALINGA	Party-list	
Members for the Minority	Stella Luz Quimbo	Liberal	Marikina	2nd
Members for the Minority	Francisca "France" Castro	ACT TEACHERS	Party-list	
Members for the Minority	Isagani Amatong	Liberal	Zamboanga del Norte	3rd
Members for the Minority	Gabriel Bordado Jr.	Liberal	Camarines Sur	3rd

==== Member for the Majority ====
- Resurreccion Acop (Note: Died on May 28, 2021.) (Antipolo–2nd, NUP)
- Marissa Andaya (Note: Died on July 5, 2020.) (Camarines Sur–1st, NPC)
- Marisol Panotes (Note: Died on April 29, 2022.) (Camarines Norte–2nd, PDP-Laban)

=== 17th Congress ===
Position	Members	Party	Province/City	District
Chairperson	Ramon Durano VI	NPC	Cebu	5th
Vice Chairpersons	Cristal Bagatsing	NUP	Manila	5th
Vice Chairpersons	Cheryl Deloso-Montalla	Liberal Party	Zambales	2nd

==== Chairperson ====
- Evelina Escudero (Note: Removed on March 15, 2017 for voting against a bill restoring the death penalty.) (Sorsogon–2nd, NPC)

=== 16th Congress ===
Position	Members	Party	Province/City	District
Chairperson	Ma. Carmen "Kimi" S. Cojuangco	NPC	Pangasinan	5th

=== 15th Congress ===
Position	Members	Party	Province/City	District
Vice Chairpersons	Rosenda Ann "Sandy" Ocampo (Note: Acting chairperson from August 2012 to June 2013.)	Liberal	Manila	6th
Vice Chairpersons	Wilfrido Mark Enverga	NPC	Quezon	1st
Members for the Majority	Henedina Abad	Liberal	Batanes	At-large
Members for the Majority	Ben Evardone	Liberal	Eastern Samar	At-large

==== Chairperson ====
- Salvador Escudero III (Note: Died on August 13, 2012.) (Sorsogon–1st, Liberal)

=== 14th Congress ===
Position	Members	Party	Province/City	District
Chairperson	Del de Guzman	Lakas–CMD	Marikina	2nd

=== 13th Congress ===
Position	Members	Party	Province/City	District
Chairperson	Edmundo O. Reyes Jr.	Lakas–CMD	Marinduque	At-large

=== 12th Congress ===
Position	Members	Party	Province/City	District
Chairperson	Edmundo O. Reyes Jr.	Lakas–CMD	Marinduque	At-large

=== 11th Congress ===
Position	Members	Party	Province/City	District
Chairperson	Allen S. Quimpo	LAMP	Aklan	At-large

=== 10th Congress ===
Position	Members	Party	Province/City	District
Chairperson	Salvador Escudero III	NPC	Sorsogon	1st

=== 9th Congress ===
Position	Members	Party	Province/City	District
Chairperson	Salvador Escudero III	NPC	Sorsogon	1st

=== 8th Congress ===
Position	Members	Party	Province/City	District
Chairperson	Carlos Padilla	PDP-Laban	Nueva Vizcaya	At-large

=== 6th Congress ===
Position	Members	Party	Province/City	District
Chairperson	Salih Ututalum	Liberal	Sulu	At-large
Vice Chairpersons	Aurora Abad	Liberal	Batanes	At-large
Vice Chairpersons	Alberto Ubay	Liberal	Zamboanga del Norte	At-large
Members	Aguedo Agbayani	Nacionalista	Pangasinan	1st
Members	Josefina B. Duran	Liberal	Albay	3rd
Members	Andres Clemente Jr.	Nacionalista	Masbate	At-large
Members	Manuel S. Enverga	Nacionalista	Quezon	1st
Members	Ramon Felipe Jr.	Liberal	Camarines Sur	1st
Members	Benjamin T. Ligot	Nacionalista	Cagayan	2nd
Members	Lamberto L. Macias	Nacionalista	Negros Oriental	2nd
Members	José D. Moreno	Nacionalista	Romblon	At-large
Members	Juanita Nepomuceno	Liberal	Pampanga	1st
Members	Ma. Salud Vivero Parreño	Nacionalista	Leyte	2nd
Members	Vicente Peralta	Nacionalista	Sorsogon	2nd
Members	Pablo R. Roman	Nacionalista	Bataan	At-large
Members	Jack Laureano Soriano	Nacionalista	Pangasinan	2nd
Members	Gloria Tabiana	Liberal	Iloilo	3rd
Members	Dominador Tan	Liberal	Leyte	4th
Members	Pedro G. Trono	Liberal	Iloilo	1st
Members	Venancio P. Ziga	Liberal	Albay	1st

==== Members ====
- Magnolia Antonino (Note: Resigned as congresswoman in 1967.) (La Union–1st, Independent)
- Emmanuel Pelaez (Note: Resigned as congressman in 1967.) (Misamis Oriental–Lone, Nacionalista)

== See also ==
- House of Representatives of the Philippines
- List of Philippine House of Representatives committees
- Department of Education
- Culture of the Philippines
