= List of elections in 2016 =

== Africa ==
=== Benin Republic ===
- 2016 Beninese presidential election 6 March 2016

=== Cape Verde ===
- 2016 Cape Verdean presidential election 2 October 2016

=== Chad ===
- 2016 Chadian presidential election 10 April 2016

=== Djibouti ===
- 2016 Djiboutian presidential election 8 April 2016

=== Equatorial Guinea ===
- 2016 Equatorial Guinean presidential election 24 April 2016

=== Gambia ===
- 2016 Gambian presidential election 1 December 2016

=== Gabon ===
- 2016 Gabonese presidential election 27 August 2016

=== Ghana ===
- 2016 Ghanaian general election 7 December 2016

=== Morocco ===
- 2016 Moroccan general election 7 October 2016

=== Niger ===
- 2016 Nigerien general election 21 February and 20 March 2016

=== Nigeria ===
- 2016 Edo State gubernatorial election 28 September 2016
- Gubernatorial elections for Ondo State, Bayelsa State, Kogi State

=== Republic of Congo ===
- 2016 Republic of the Congo presidential election 20 March 2016

=== São Tomé and Príncipe ===
- 2016 São Tomé and Príncipe presidential election 17 July and 7 August 2016

=== Senegal ===
- 2016 Senegalese constitutional referendum 20 March 2016

=== Seychelles ===
- 2016 Seychellois parliamentary election 8–10 September 2016

=== South Africa ===
- 2016 South African municipal election 3 August 2016

=== Somalia ===
- 2016 Somali parliamentary election 23 October and 10 November 2016

=== Uganda ===
- 2016 Ugandan general election 18 February 2016

=== Zambia ===
- 2016 Zambian general election 11 August 2016
- 2016 Zambian constitutional referendum 11 August 2016

== Asia ==
=== Japan ===
- 2016 Japanese House of Councillors election 10 July 2016

=== Hong Kong ===
- 2016 Hong Kong legislative election 4 September 2016

=== India ===
- 2016 Assam Legislative Assembly election 4 and 11 April 2016
- 2016 West Bengal Legislative Assembly election 4 and 11 April 2016
- 2016 Kerala Legislative Assembly election 16 May 2016
- 2016 Puducherry Legislative Assembly election 16 May 2016
- 2016 Tamil Nadu Legislative Assembly election 16 May 2016

=== Iran ===
- 2016 Iranian legislative election 26 February 2016

=== Kazakhstan ===
- 2016 Kazakhstani legislative election 20 March 2016

=== Kuwait ===
- 2016 Kuwaiti general election 26 November 2016

=== Mongolia ===
- 2016 Mongolian legislative election 29 June 2016

=== Philippines ===
- 2016 Philippine general election (May 9, 2016)
  - 2016 Philippine presidential election
  - 2016 Philippine Senate election
  - 2016 Philippine House of Representatives elections
  - 2016 Autonomous Region in Muslim Mindanao general election
  - 2016 Philippine gubernatorial elections
- 2016 Philippine barangay and Sangguniang Kabataan elections (October 2016)

=== South Korea ===
- 2016 South Korean legislative election 13 April 2016

=== Syria ===
- 2016 Syrian parliamentary election 13 April 2016

=== Republic of China (Taiwan) ===
- 2016 Republic of China legislative election 16 January 2016
- 2016 Republic of China presidential election 16 January 2016

=== Vietnam ===
- 2016 Vietnamese legislative election 22 May 2016

=== Uzbekistan ===
- 2016 Uzbekistani presidential election 4 December 2016

== Europe ==
=== Austria ===
- 2016 Austrian presidential election 24 April and 22 May 2016

=== Bulgaria ===
- 2016 Bulgarian presidential election 6 and 13 November 2016

=== Czech Republic ===
- 2016 Czech Senate election 7-8 and 14–15 October 2016
- 2016 Czech regional elections 7–8 October 2016

=== Croatia ===
- 2016 Croatian parliamentary election 11 September 2016

=== Georgia ===
- 2016 Georgian parliamentary election 8 October 2016

=== Germany ===
- 2016 Baden-Württemberg state election 13 March 2016
- 2016 Rhineland-Palatinate state election 13 March 2016
- 2016 Saxony-Anhalt state election 13 March 2016
- 2016 Mecklenburg-Vorpommern state election 4 September 2016
- 2016 Berlin state election 18 September 2016

=== Hungary ===
- 2016 Hungarian migrant quota referendum 2 October 2016

=== Iceland ===
- 2016 Icelandic presidential election 25 June 2016
- 2016 Icelandic parliamentary election 29 October 2016

=== Ireland ===
- 2016 Irish general election 26 February 2016

=== Isle of Man ===
- 2016 Manx general election 22 September 2016

=== Italy ===
- 2016 Italian constitutional referendum 4 December 2016
- 2015 Italian local elections 5 June 2016

=== Lithuania ===
- 2016 Lithuanian parliamentary election 9 and 23 October 2016

=== Macedonia ===
- 2016 Macedonian parliamentary election 11 December 2016

=== Moldova ===
- 2016 Moldovan presidential election 30 October 2016

=== Montenegro ===
- 2016 Montenegrin municipal election 7 April and 16 October 2016
- 2016 Montenegrin parliamentary election 16 October 2016

=== Portugal ===
- 2016 Portuguese presidential election 24 January 2016
- 2016 Azores regional election 16 October 2016

=== Romania ===
- 2016 Romanian local election 5 June 2016
- 2016 Romanian legislative election 11 December 2016

=== Russia ===
- 2016 Russian legislative election 18 September 2016

=== Serbia ===
- 2016 Serbian local elections 24 April 2016
- 2016 Serbian parliamentary election 24 April 2016

=== Slovakia ===
- 2016 Slovak parliamentary election 5 March 2016

=== Spain ===
- 2016 Spanish general election 26 June 2016
- 2016 Basque parliamentary election 25 September 2016
- 2016 Galician parliamentary election 25 September 2016

=== United Kingdom ===
- 2016 National Assembly for Wales election 5 May 2016
- 2016 United Kingdom local elections 5 May 2016
- 2016 London mayoral election 5 May 2016
- 2016 London Assembly election 5 May 2016
- 2016 Bristol mayoral election 5 May 2016
- 2016 England and Wales police and crime commissioner elections 5 May 2016
- 2016 Scottish Parliament election 5 May 2016
- 2016 Northern Ireland Assembly election 5 May 2016
- 2016 United Kingdom European Union membership referendum 23 June 2016

== North America ==
=== Canada ===
- 2016 Manitoba general election 19 April 2016
- 2016 Saskatchewan general election 4 April 2016

=== Dominican Republic ===
- 2016 Dominican Republic general election 15 May 2016

=== Haiti ===
- February 2016 Haitian presidential election 14 February 2016
- November 2016 Haitian presidential election 20 November 2016

=== Jamaica ===
- 2016 Jamaican local elections - November 28, 2016
- 2016 Jamaican general election - February 25, 2016

=== Nicaragua ===
- 2016 Nicaraguan general election 6 November 2016

=== United States ===
- 2016 United States elections:
  - 2016 United States presidential election 8 November 2016
  - 2016 United States Senate elections 8 November 2016
  - 2016 United States House of Representatives elections 8 November 2016
  - 2016 United States gubernatorial elections 8 November 2016

== South America ==
=== Brazil ===
- 2016 Brazilian municipal elections 2 and 30 October 2016

=== Chile ===
- 2016 Chilean municipal election

=== Peru ===
- 2016 Peruvian general election 10 April 2016

== Oceania ==
=== Australia ===
- 2016 Australian Capital Territory election 15 October 2016
- 2016 Australian federal election 2 July 2016
- 2016 Northern Territory general election 27 August 2016

=== Kiribati ===
- 2016 Kiribati presidential election 9 March 2016

=== Nauru ===
- 2016 Nauruan parliamentary election 9 July 2016

=== New Zealand ===
- 2016 New Zealand local elections 8 October 2016

=== Samoa ===
- 2016 Samoan general election 4 March 2016

=== Vanuatu ===
- 2016 Vanuatuan general election 22 January 2016

== See also ==
- Local electoral calendar 2016
- National electoral calendar 2016
- Supranational electoral calendar 2016
