= 2016 supranational electoral calendar =

List of elections

This supranational electoral calendar for the year 2016 lists the supranational elections held in 2016.

== April ==
- 10 April: Andean Parliament, Election of the Peruvian representatives

== May ==
- 15 May: Central American Parliament (Parlacen), Election of the Dominican deputies to the Parlacen

== June ==
- 13 June: United Nations General Assembly, President
- 28 June: United Nations Security Council, Security Council

== July ==
- 21 July–5 October: United Nations, United Nations Secretary-General

== November ==
- 6 November: Central American Parliament (Parlacen), Election of the Nicaraguan deputies to the Parlacen
