= Alan Peter Cayetano =

Filipino politician (born 1970)

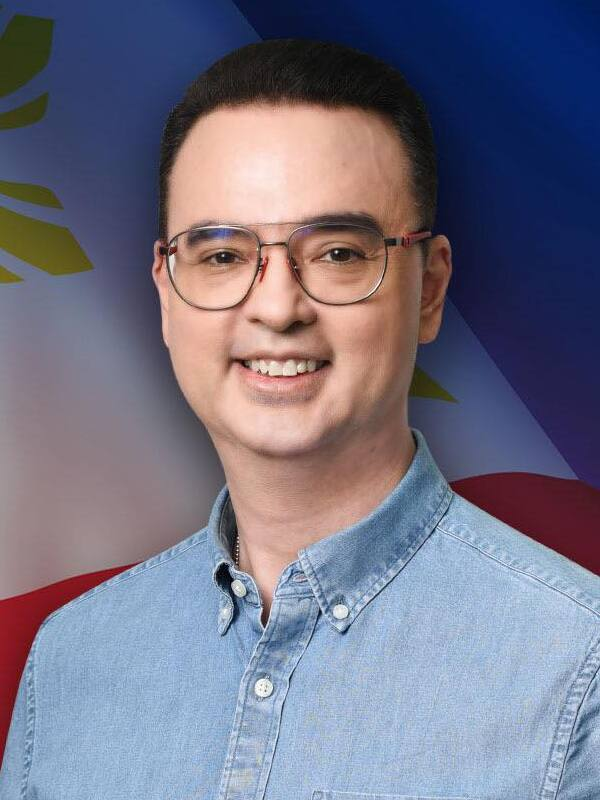
- Official portrait, 2022

33rd President of the Senate of the Philippines
- In office May 11, 2026 – June 3, 2026 (Note: Despite his ouster on June 3, Cayetano continued to claim the Senate presidency until June 17, when he recognized the new majority bloc.)
- Preceded by: Tito Sotto
- Succeeded by: Sherwin Gatchalian

Senate Minority Leader
- Incumbent
- Assumed office June 17, 2026
- Preceded by: Tito Sotto
- In office September 9, 2025 – May 11, 2026
- Preceded by: Tito Sotto
- Succeeded by: Tito Sotto
- In office July 26, 2010 – July 22, 2013
- Preceded by: Nene Pimentel
- Succeeded by: Juan Ponce Enrile

Senate Majority Leader
- In office July 22, 2013 – July 25, 2016
- Preceded by: Gregorio Honasan (acting)
- Succeeded by: Tito Sotto

Senator of the Philippines
- Incumbent
- Assumed office June 30, 2022
- In office June 30, 2007 – May 17, 2017 (Note: Original term until June 30, 2019; resigned on May 17, 2017, to sit as Secretary of Foreign Affairs.)
Committee positions
Chair of the Senate Banks, Financial Institutions and Currencies Committee
In office August 4, 2025 – September 15, 2025
Preceded by	Mark Villar
Succeeded by	Joel Villanueva
Chair of the Senate Justice and Human Rights Committee
In office July 29, 2025 – September 10, 2025
Preceded by	Koko Pimentel
Succeeded by	Kiko Pangilinan
Chair of the Senate Agrarian Reform Committee
In office July 25, 2016 – May 17, 2017
Preceded by	Gregorio Honasan
Succeeded by	Cynthia Villar
Chair of the Senate Foreign Relations Committee
In office July 25, 2016 – May 17, 2017
Preceded by	Miriam Defensor Santiago
Succeeded by	Loren Legarda
Chair of the Senate Blue Ribbon Committee
In office July 23, 2007 – February 2, 2009
Preceded by	Joker Arroyo
Succeeded by	Richard J. Gordon

26th Speaker of the House of Representatives of the Philippines
- In office July 22, 2019 – October 12, 2020
- Deputy: See list: Paolo Duterte; Ferdinand Hernandez; Loren Legarda; Evelina Escudero; Conrado Estrella III; Prospero Pichay Jr.; Roberto Puno; Eddie Villanueva; Aurelio Gonzales Jr.; Johnny Pimentel; Luis Raymund Villafuerte; Raneo Abu; Neptali Gonzales II; Dan Fernandez; Rose Marie Arenas; Rodante Marcoleta; Henry Oaminal; Pablo John Garcia; Vilma Santos-Recto; Deogracias Victor Savellano; Mujiv Hataman; Mikee Romero; Fredenil Castro
- Preceded by: Gloria Macapagal Arroyo
- Succeeded by: Lord Allan Velasco

Member of the Philippine House of Representatives for Taguig–Pateros
- In office June 30, 2019 – June 30, 2022
- Preceded by: Arnel Cerafica
- Succeeded by: Ading Cruz
- Constituency: 1st district
- In office June 30, 1998 – June 30, 2007
- Preceded by: Dante Tiñga
- Succeeded by: Post dissolved
- Constituency: At-large district

26th Secretary of Foreign Affairs
- In office May 18, 2017 – October 17, 2018
- President: Rodrigo Duterte
- Preceded by: Enrique Manalo (acting)
- Succeeded by: Teodoro Locsin Jr.

Vice Mayor of Taguig
- In office June 20, 1998 – June 30, 1998
- Mayor: Isidro Garcia
- Preceded by: Loida Labao-Alzona
- Succeeded by: Loida Labao-Alzona

Member of the Taguig Municipal Council from the 2nd district
- In office July 6, 1992 – June 30, 1995

Chairman of the Philippine SEA Games Organizing Committee
- In office November 30, 2019 – December 11, 2019

Personal details
- Born: Alan Peter Schramm Cayetano; October 28, 1970 (age 56) Mandaluyong, Rizal, Philippines
- Citizenship: Philippines (disputed); United States (until 1999)
- Party: Independent (since 2021)
- Other political affiliations: Nacionalista (2005–2021); Lakas (2001–2005); Liberal (1998–2001)
- Spouse: Laarni Lopez (m. 2004)
- Parent: Rene Cayetano (father)
- Relatives: Cayetano family
- Education: University of the Philippines Diliman (BA); Ateneo de Manila University (JD)
- Occupation: Politician; diplomat
- Profession: Lawyer

Alan Peter Schramm Cayetano (Tagalog: [kajɛˈtano]; born October 28, 1970) is a Filipino politician and lawyer who served as the 33rd president of the Senate for 23 days after being ousted. He is a Senator of the Philippines since 2022 and previously from 2007 to 2017. He was previously a congressman from 1998-2007 and 2019-2022, serving as speaker of the House of Representatives for 15 months and later being ousted and secretary of foreign affairs for 17 months. He unsuccessfully ran for vice president in the 2016 elections as the running mate of Rodrigo Duterte. Since 2021, Cayetano has been an independent politician after leaving the Nacionalista Party.

Various controversies have hounded Cayetano throughout his political career. In 2012, he and his sister Pia, were the largest spenders of pork barrel during the height of the pork barrel scandal. In 2019, he became the chairperson of the organizing committee for the controversial 2019 SEA Games, where P9.5 billion in taxpayer money was used to construct the overpriced main sports venue. He was also appointed chairperson of the Defeat COVID-19 Ad Hoc Committee during the early months of the COVID-19 pandemic in the Philippines, during which the country's response to the pandemic was ranked as among the worst in the world. He is criticized as a Tsinador (Chinese senator) for his long list of pro-China positions, such as when he voted against a resolution condemning China's attacks on the Philippines, and when he downplayed China's war threats against Filipinos. Cayetano has met various high-ranking Chinese officials, and supported controversial Chinese ambassador Jing Quan who threatened the Philippines, while his short House speakership was publicly supported by China.

In 2026, Cayetano staged a Senate leadership coup and assisted Senator Ronald dela Rosa, leading to a three-day standoff after Cayetano prevented an International Criminal Court warrant on dela Rosa for crimes against humanity. Cayetano, who was later ousted, masterminded the fake Senate shooting incident to help fugitive dela Rosa escape from the law. Cayetano is also one of the senators who blocked and refused to sign the Senate Blue Ribbon Committee report on the flood control scandal where his family was allegedly involved in anomalous projects worth billions of pesos. He is also embroiled in a multi-billion corruption scandal in his bailiwick of Taguig City concerning illegal reclamation activities in Laguna de Bay. He was also named to have at least ₱6.7B in insertions in the 2025 national budget, named the most corrupt budget in Philippine history.

== Early life and education ==
Alan Peter Schramm Cayetano was born in Mandaluyong on October 28, 1970 to Filipino lawyer Renato "Compañero" Cayetano and kindergarten teacher Sandra Schramm, an American of German ethnicity from Michigan. He was raised in Parañaque and moved to Taguig in 1991. Although he inherited United States citizenship by descent, he relinquished his U.S. citizenship in 1998, which was formally granted in 1999.

Cayetano resides with his family in Bagumbayan, Taguig. His wife, Lani, is the incumbent mayor of Taguig and formerly represented the first and second districts of Taguig–Pateros at the House of Representatives of the Philippines. His older sister, Pia, is an incumbent Senator and formerly represented the second district of Taguig at the House of Representatives of the Philippines, where she was also a Deputy Speaker. His youngest brother, Lino, is a film and television director as well as a former congressman and mayor of Taguig, while his other brother Ren is a former councilor of Muntinlupa. The Cayetano family is considered one of the Philippines' political dynasties.

In the 1980s, Cayetano admitted to having nearly been expelled from high school at the De La Salle Santiago Zobel School in Muntinlupa due to him regularly joining his father Rene at the Batasang Pambansa instead of attending class.

In college, he studied political science at the University of the Philippines Diliman and graduated in 1993. He was an elected member of the UP Diliman University Student Council. On September 17, 1990, Cayetano and other UP students attended a rally organized in front of the US Embassy in Ermita, Manila, expressing opposition to the presence of American bases in the Philippines during the visit of American diplomat Richard Armitage. According to eyewitnesses, when the students were violently dispersed with tear gas by the Western Police District and detained, Cayetano's first lines to a police officer was stating that he was the son of politician Rene Cayetano, after which he and fellow councilor Roby Alampay were released from police custody.

He later finished his Juris Doctor degree from the Ateneo de Manila University School of Law in 1997, graduating 2nd Honors (silver medalist). Thereafter, he was admitted to the Philippine bar in 1998.

== Early career ==
=== Councilor of Taguig (1992–1995) ===
Cayetano, then a junior year college student at University of the Philippines, was elected as councilor of the then-municipality of Taguig in 1992. Elected at the age of 21, he was the youngest elected councilor in the country in 1992, and served alongside actor Rene Requiestas and six other councilors. He became Taguig's Majority Floor Leader and held various positions, such as the vice-chairperson of the People's Law Enforcement Board.

From 1992 to 1993, Cayetano concurrently served as the chairman of the National Capital Region Chapter of the National Movement of Young Legislators.

=== Vice mayor of Taguig (1998) ===
Cayetano was elected vice mayor of Taguig in the 1995 local elections, but was only proclaimed on June 20, 1998, ten days before the end of his term, due to contentious electoral disputes with his opponent Loida Labao-Alzona, a former mayoral candidate in 1992. The two eventually reconciled with each other, with Cayetano inviting Labao-Alzona to be godmother at his wedding with Lani in 2004. According to Cayetano's profile in the book Senate Memento 2013, the three-year electoral dispute was when Cayetano "realized that his political detractors would spare nothing to stop him in his advocacy for good governance."

== House of Representatives (1998–2007) ==
Cayetano ran for the House of Representatives of the Philippines in 1998 as the representative of the lone district of Taguig–Pateros under the Liberal Party. He was the youngest elected representative at the 11th Congress at age 27.

In his first term as a neophyte legislator, Cayetano immediately held major roles and functions, such as being voted as the assistant majority leader. He was also chairman of the Oversight Committee on Bases Conversion and Sub-Committee on New Schools (Committee on Education), and the vice-chairman of the Committee on Suffrage and Electoral Reforms.

During his second term in the 12th Congress, Cayetano became deputy majority leader and the vice-chairman of the Committee on Rules.

On his last term in the 13th Congress, he served as the Senior Deputy Minority Leader and an ex officio member of all standing House committees. He also became a fierce critic of then-President Gloria Macapagal Arroyo. In August 2006, he falsely accused First Gentleman Jose Miguel Arroyo of not disclosing the "hundreds of millions of dollars" that he allegedly stashed in the Munich bank HypoVereinsbank, to which he was sued for libel by Arroyo and other family members before the Quezon City Regional Trial Court.

By September 6, 2006, first gentleman Arroyo, his brother Rep. Ignacio Arroyo, and his sons Diosdado and Rep. Mikey Arroyo filed a complaint before the House Ethics Committee seeking Cayetano's expulsion from Congress for fabricating evidence and engaging in "improper conduct". By November 21, 2006, Cayetano issued his own complaint against Reps. Ignacio and Mikey Arroyo that sought their expulsion, accusing them of receiving monthly payola that amounts to "graft and corruption". Although the committee, as chaired by Bohol Rep. Roberto Cajes, found Arroyo's complaint to have "substantial and credible evidence" against Cayetano, the congressman's expulsion did not come to fruition.

== Senate (2007–2017) ==
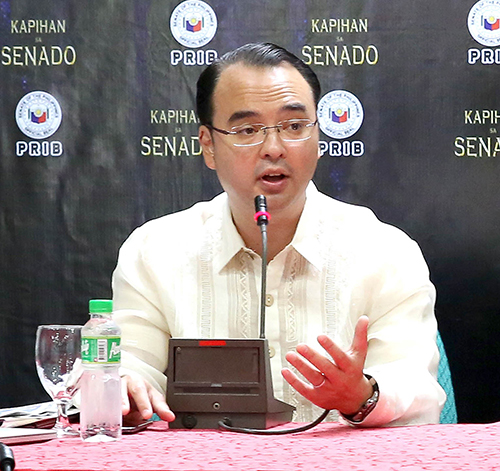
Senate Majority Floor Leader Alan Peter Cayetano at the Kapihan sa Senado forum on March 17, 2016

Cayetano ran for senator in 2007 under the Genuine Opposition coalition and won, placing ninth among of the 12 winning candidates. He was elected Senate Minority Leader for the 15th Congress in 2010.

Cayetano was the second richest among six senators running for reelection in 2013. He and the Nacionalista Party received ₱87.7 million in campaign donations from Manny Villar and family. Cayetano was among the top 10 in ad spending among all candidates, having spent ₱74.49 million for his advertisements. He was re-elected to the Senate in 2013, running under the Team PNoy administration coalition.

At the start of the 16th Congress in 2013, Cayetano was elected as the new Senate Majority Floor Leader and was likewise appointed to chair the Senate Committee on Rules. He had participated in hearings probing the corruption allegations thrown against then-Vice President Jejomar Binay.

=== Pork barrel scam and campaign donations ===
During the height of the pork barrel scam in mid 2013, Janet Lim-Napoles in her affidavit included Cayetano's name in her list of lawmakers whom she worked with. Napoles claimed that the agent who liaised with Cayetano was a certain "Tito Boy" who claims to be an uncle of Cayetano. Napoles however said that the initial payment to Tito Boy was returned since they could not meet Cayetano's higher demand. Cayetano's name also appeared in Sen. Ping Lacson, and Justice Secretary Leila De Lima's List. Napoles claimed meeting Cayetano at his sister's restaurant Slice in Bonifacio Global City in Taguig, where she handed him personally a campaign donation.

Cayetano denied ever meeting Napoles or receiving kickback money from her. He confirmed however knowing "Tito Boy," but said that he was not in the country and was not involved in the pork barrel.

Senators Alan Peter Cayetano and Pia Cayetano channeled a large amount of their pork barrel funds to Taguig City where Alan Peter Cayetano's spouse Lani was serving as mayor. In August 2014, Alan Peter Cayetano was charged with graft over alleged irregularities with the spending of his pork barrel from 2007 to 2009, during which there was an alleged "inordinate increase" in his net worth. In 2011, Alan Peter Cayetano's wealth increased from ₱15.8 million to ₱23.2 million.

Alan Peter Cayetano and Lani Cayetano were also charged with graft for the purchase of 18 allegedly overpriced multicabs, bought at ₱498,000 each.

Alan Peter and Pia Cayetano were the biggest pork spenders in the Senate, having spent ₱256,700,000 and ₱277,006,092 of their pork barrel in 2012.

=== Oplan Stop Nognog 2016 ===
In February 2016, the lawyer of Vice President Jejomar Binay disclosed to the media that Cayetano, along with Senator Antonio Trillanes IV, Caloocan Representative Edgar Erice, Vince Dizon, Ronald Llamas, Hernani Braganza, along with businessmen Enrico Gutierrez of SR Metals, and Salvador Zamora of Nickel Asia were engaging in discreet meetings that aimed to derail his 2016 presidential campaign dubbed as Oplan Stop Nognog. Nognog is a cartoon character popularized during the 1960 and 1970s, and it has become a pejorative towards dark skinned individuals. Trillanes and Cayetano had previously led the 25 hearings of the Blue Ribbon Committee on the wealth and assets of Binay. Binay's camp added that Interior and Local Government Secretary Mar Roxas was the brains behind Oplan Stop Nognog 2016.

Cayetano called the accusation a figment of Binay's imagination.

== 2016 vice presidential campaign ==
In a press event held in Davao City, Senator Cayetano announced that he would seek election for vice president in the 2016 national elections under the Nacionalista Party, but did not mention who would be his presidential running mate. On November 21, 2015, it was made official that Davao City mayor Rodrigo Duterte would be his running mate for the 2016 presidential elections.

Cayetano donated more than ₱71 million to Duterte's campaign, placing him among Duterte's top donors, and spent ₱199,872.42 for his own campaign. Election watchdog Legal Network for Truthful Elections (LENTE) flagged the amount, noting that Cayetano's salary is less than half a million a month.

Although Duterte won the presidency, Cayetano lost to then-congresswoman Leni Robredo, placing third in both unofficial and official vote counts conducted by COMELEC and the Congress, respectively.

=== 2016 election squabble ===
During the launch of the Duterte-Cayetano at Tondo, Manila, Cayetano's staff were accused by the senatoriable candidates of the camp, Sandra Cam, Greco Belgica, Gen. Dionisio Santiago (Ret.), Rafael Alunan III, and Ding Diaz, of blocking their opportunity to go to the platform and hold their own speeches.

== Secretary of foreign affairs (2017–2018) ==
=== Appointment ===
On May 10, 2017, President Rodrigo Duterte announced that he appointed as Cayetano as secretary of foreign affairs, following the expiration of the one-year appointment ban on losing candidates of the 2016 elections. Cayetano replaced acting secretary Enrique Manalo, who assumed the post in March 2017 when the Commission on Appointments's (CA) rejected President Duterte's ad interim appointment of Perfecto Yasay Jr. due to the latter's citizenship concerns.

His appointment to the post by President Duterte was approved by the CA's foreign affairs committee on May 17, 2017. Upon approval of the CA's plenary, he assumed the post as foreign secretary and effectively resigned from his post as senator. On May 18, Cayetano was sworn in by President Duterte at the Malacañang of the South in Davao City.

=== Territorial disputes ===
Cayetano described his approach in resolving the territorial disputes of the Philippines, as "objective-based", describing the process as negotiation through the use of historical facts, such as the Treaty of Paris of 1898 and the United Nations Convention on the Law of the Sea, to defend the Philippines' claims. He also vowed to avoid "microphone diplomacy", which he defined as the continual issuing of public statements instead of privately negotiating the issues with the parties.

In January 2018, Magdalo Party-List Representative Gary Alejano revealed that Cayetano had approved the Chinese Institute of Oceanology of the Chinese Academy of Sciences to perform a scientific survey of the Philippine Rise, while disapproving a French research offer in the Rise. Under the agreement, majority of researchers must be Chinese. On the same month, China told Filipino counterparts that the Philippines has no right in the Philippine Rise. Filipino President Rodrigo Duterte's trusted spokesperson Harry Roque embraced and defended China's statement, causing outrage from various Filipino sectors.

In March 2018, Cayetano reiterated that the West Philippine Sea is "disputed", despite a 2016 decision by an international court backed by the United Nations declaring that the Philippines has the sole legal right on the resources of the West Philippine Sea, and which also deemed the Philippines as the internationally acknowledged country with jurisdiction on the area.

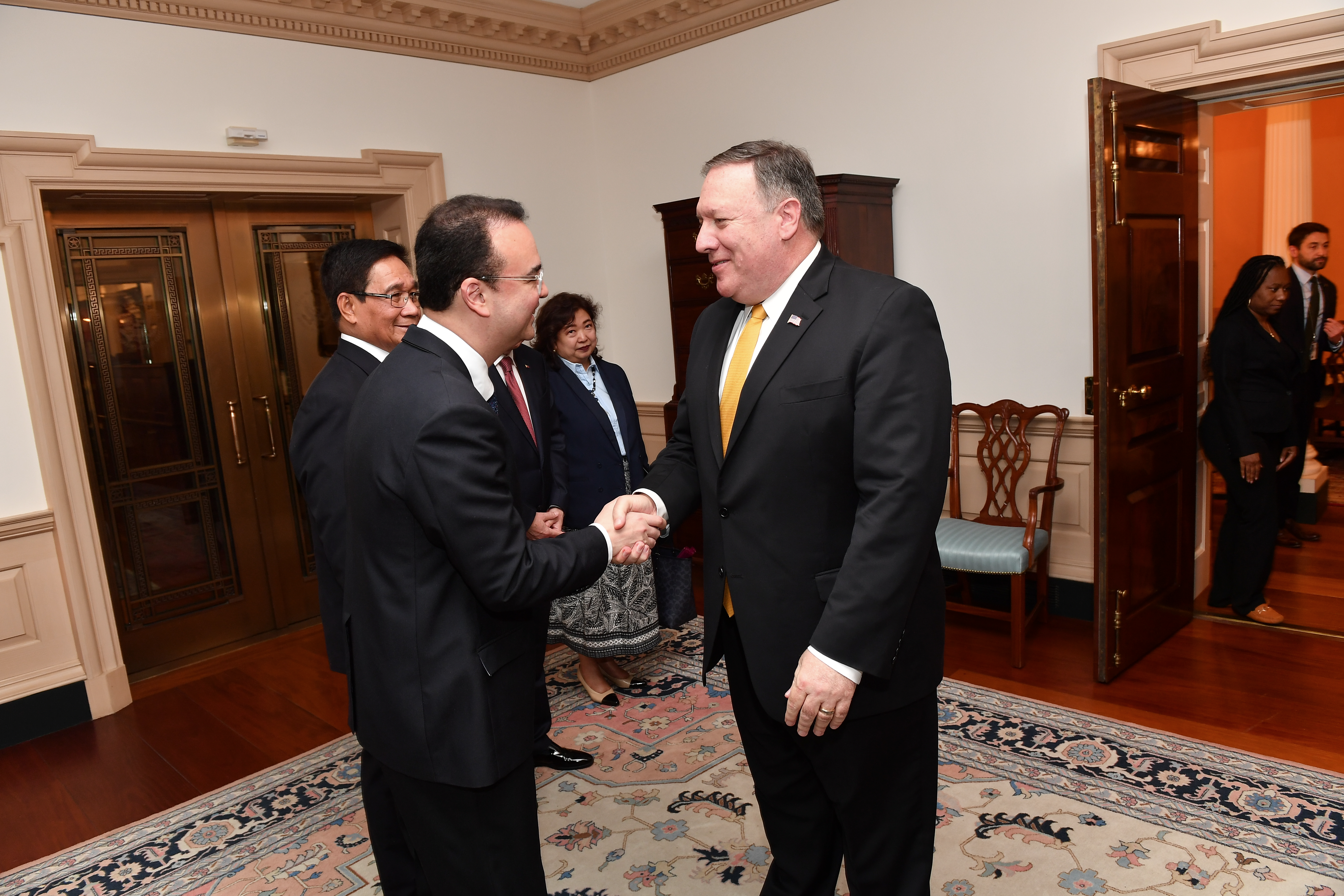
Cayetano meets with U.S. Secretary of State Mike Pompeo during the former's visit to the U.S. State Department in Washington D.C., June 21, 2018

Cayetano cited the continued conflict over territories, specifically islands, which are not covered by the ruling under the United Nations Convention on the Law of the Sea. Cayetano took the stance that acknowledging the dispute was resolved by the 2016 ruling is not equal to giving up Philippine claims on the territory.

=== Drug war ===
In July 2016, Cayetano defended drug war killings in an interview with CNN's Christiane Amanpour.

In August 2016, Cayetano presented statistics meant to show that murder and homicide had dropped during Duterte's drug war. However, his graph was statistically flawed and did not accurately depict comparisons with previous periods. His figures were also inconsistent with those presented by police chief Ronald dela Rosa.

In May 2017, Cayetano defended the drug war before the United Nations Human Rights Council, drawing criticism from human rights workers.

On October 6, 2017, Cayetano was interviewed by British journalist Mehdi Hasan on Al Jazeera. When Hasan asked Cayetano if the 3,800 people killed during police operations were drug pushers, Cayetano answered yes. Mehdi questioned how Cayetano came to that conclusion when the murdered individuals were never given a fair trial. Cayetano responded by claiming police officers responded in self-defense to the alleged drug pushers threatening the officers with guns.

Cayetano on multiple occasions made false claims regarding the definition and origin of the term "extrajudicial killings" and was subject to fact checking by Philippine Star and Vera Files.

Human Rights Watch called Cayetano Duterte's "Denier-in-Chief" as he rejected the report on the Philippines by the United Nations' Universal Periodic Review (UPR) on Duterte administration's human rights record, and the government-sponsored mass killings of its own citizens. Cayetano would call the report "disinformation" and fake news. Cayetano also added that foreign organizations have no right to interfere in Philippine affairs, since the issue tackles Philippine sovereignty.

Cayetano said in 2018 that human rights activists were the "unwitting tools" of drug lords, drawing criticism from Karapatan and other human rights groups. Bayan Muna Representative Carlos Isagani Zarate said that the Duterte government makes pronouncements without evidence, calling out the drug war and the thousands that have been killed.

In 2026, Senate President Alan Peter Cayetano drew criticism from human rights organizations for describing Deterte's drug war as a "pro-life campaign". Karapatan stated how the drug war terrorized poor communities and encouraged extrajudicial killings.

== 2019 midterm elections ==
On October 9, 2018, President Duterte announced that Cayetano had planned to run in the May 2019 elections. He eventually resigned as foreign affairs secretary on October 17, the last day of filing of certificates of candidacies. He was succeeded by former Permanent Representative of the Philippines to the United Nations Teodoro Locsin Jr. as foreign affairs secretary on the same day. Cayetano and his wife, Lani, both filed to run for representative in the first and second districts of Taguig–Pateros, respectively

=== Residency dispute ===
The COMELEC received separate petitions to disqualify the Cayetano couple due to residency issues. Cayetano indicated in his Certificate of Candidacy that his residency is Barangay Bagumbayan, while his wife indicated she was a resident of Barangay Fort Bonifacio. The petitioners argued the information they supplied violated Article 68 and 69 of the Family Code. Petitioner Leonides Buac Jr. claimed that the condominium unit indicated by Lani Cayetano was not owned by her or her husband, but that this was under the name of Lino Cayetano. Incidentally, the said unit in Two Serendra was also listed as the domicile of Pia Cayetano.

The case was later dismissed on May 7, 2019, less than a week before the election. The couple later won election to both of their contested seats.

== Speaker of the House (2019–2020) ==
=== Election ===
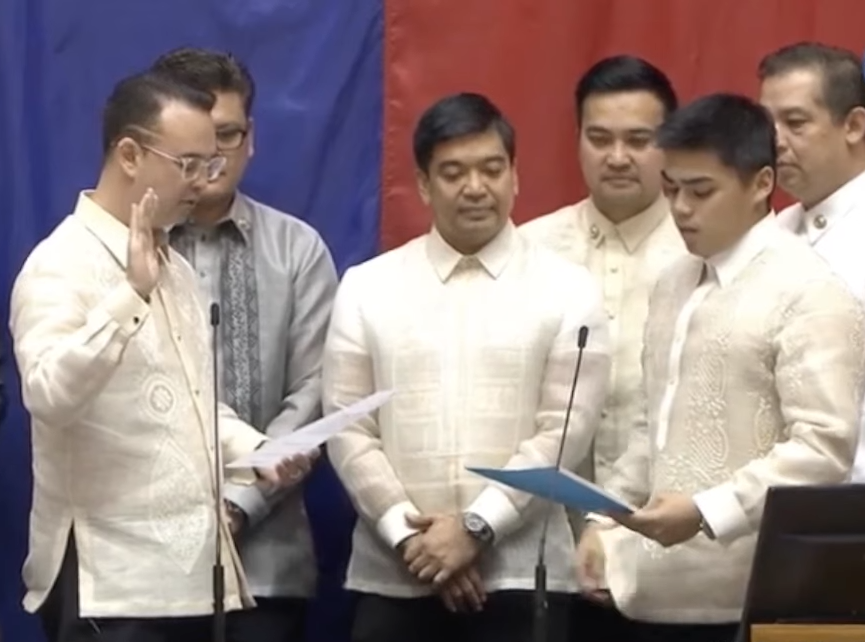
Cayetano taking his oath of office as Speaker on July 21, 2019

On the first day of the 18th Congress of the Philippines, Cayetano was elected House Speaker after gaining 266 votes against Manila Representative Benny Abante, who garnered 28 votes. Cayetano became the 22nd Speaker of the House of Representatives of the Republic of the Philippines on July 22, 2019. He was nominated by Representatives Lord Allan Velasco, Martin Romualdez and presidential son Rep. Paolo Duterte. These three representatives also announced their intention to run for speaker, but President Rodrigo Duterte gave his endorsement to Cayetano.

Cayetano agreed to share his term with Marinduque Representative Lord Allan Velasco, while the Leyte Representative Martin Romualdez, who was among the contenders for the office, agreed to become majority floor leader. The term-sharing agreement was reportedly influenced by President Duterte.

Under the term-sharing agreement, Cayetano served for 15 months and was followed by Velasco in the remaining months of the 18th Congress of the Philippines.

On September 2, the House designated him as the legislative caretaker of Camarines Sur's 1st district after Representative Marissa Andaya died of cancer on July 5. On October 16, four days after he resigned as Speaker, the caretaker position was taken over by Michael John Duavit (Rizal–1st).

=== SEA Games, cauldron controversy, and COVID-19 response ===
With approval from President Duterte, a budget of ₱7.5 billion for hosting the 2019 SEA Games was initially inserted in the proposed budget of the Department of Foreign Affairs under Cayetano, even though sports development was not part of the department's mandate or expertise. The SEA Games fund was reassigned to the Philippine Sports Commission, though it was controlled by Philippine SEA Games Organizing Committee (PHISGOC), a private organization chaired by Cayetano and tasked to organize the 2019 SEA Games. Part of the fund was exempt from government procurement laws and public bidding requirements. Cayetano's chairmanship of PHISGOC was questioned on the basis of constitutionality and delicadeza or sense of propriety.

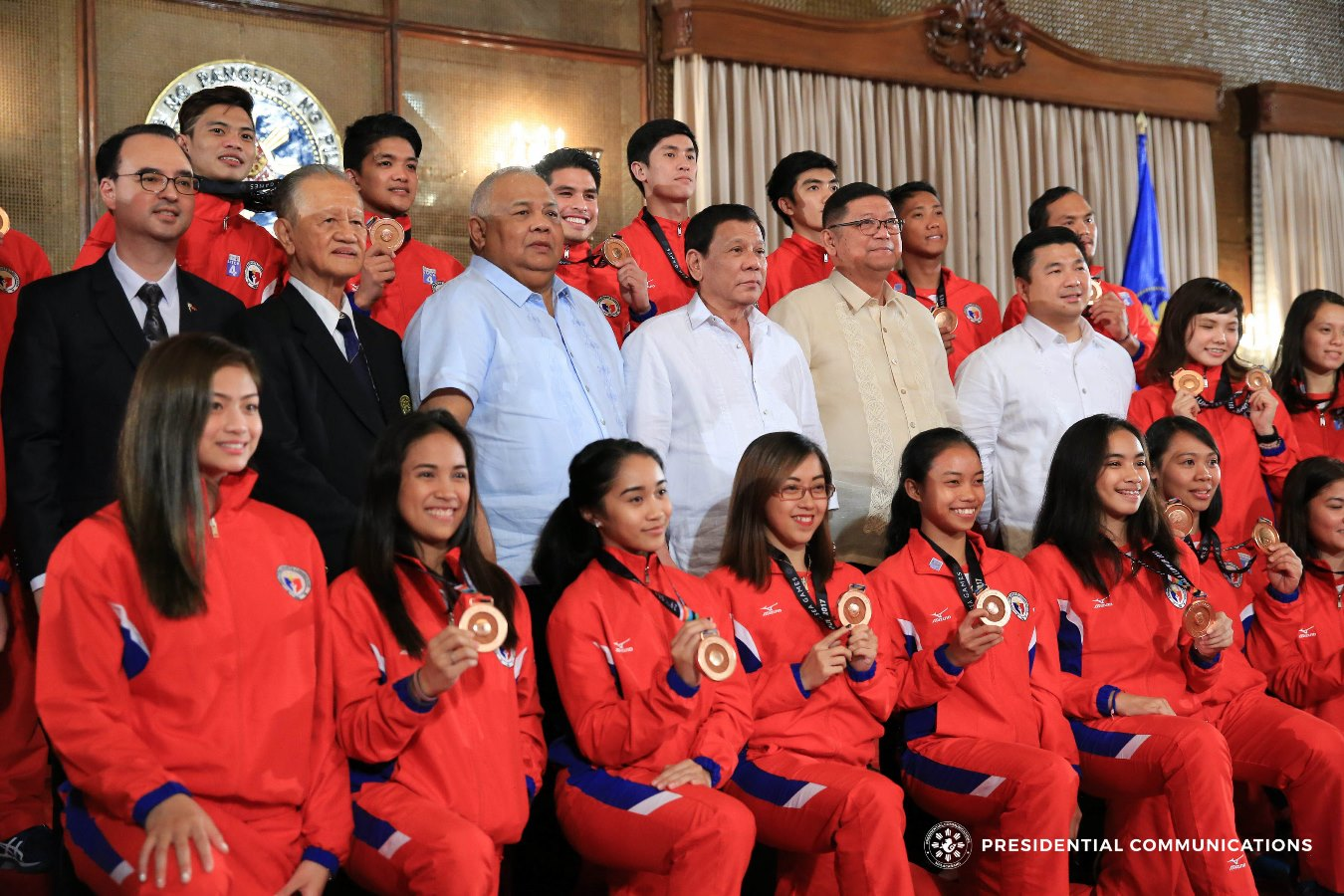
Alan Peter Cayetano with the SEAG medalists.

In November 2019, on the days leading to the 2019 Southeast Asian Games, the construction of the 2019 SEA Games cauldron at the New Clark City Sports Hub was met with public criticism due to its allegedly overpriced cost under the watch of Cayetano, who served as the chairman of PHISGOC. Senator Franklin Drilon pejoratively called the cauldron a kaldero (cooking cauldron, in Filipino) questioning the cost of the structure saying the money spent for it could have been used to build 50 classrooms. Cayetano defended the cauldron as "priceless work of art" and pointed out that the cauldron used in the 2015 Southeast Asian Games in Singapore was more expensive at ₱63 million. President Rodrigo Duterte expressed belief that there was no corruption involved in building the cauldron. In September 2021, Cayetano asserted that the cauldron was wholly funded by the private sector adding that corruption allegations regarding the cauldron caused some sponsors of the games to withdraw.

As of October 2020, PHISGOC chaired by Cayetano had ₱387 million in unpaid obligations to SEA Games suppliers. The Philippine Olympic Committee sued PHISGOC for failing to file audited financial reports on time. President Rodrigo Duterte cleared Cayetano of any wrongdoing before the Presidential Anti-Corruption Commission could begin it investigation. In November 2020, Senator Risa Hontiveros called for a Senate investigation on alleged anomalies in the funding for sports facilities at New Clark City. In 2026, the National Bureau of Investigation launched an investigation about the 2019 SEA Games for alleged irregularities.

After the COVID-19 pandemic began, the SEA Games facilities were quickly converted into quarantine facilities a mere four months after the games concluded. Cayetano was appointed as chairperson of the Defeat COVID-19 Ad Hoc Committee during the early months of the COVID-19 pandemic; during his tenure, the Philippines was ranked last in the Bloomberg Covid Resilience Ranking for September 2021, indicating that the country carried out the worst pandemic government response in the world among the 53 countries ranked.

In 2020, investigations were sought by senator Risa Hontiveros regarding the P9.5 billion in taxpayer money used to construct the main sports venue inside New Clark City, which has been flagged previously, along with a cauldron worth P50 million, by independent media investigations. However, the Senate investigation was blocked by Alan's sister Pia. Later in 2026, the National Bureau of Investigation led a probe for alleged irregularities related to the 2019 SEA Games.

=== ABS-CBN franchise renewal controversy ===
In May 2020, a number of lawmakers blamed Cayetano for the shutdown of ABS-CBN broadcasting due to his inaction on numerous bills seeking to renew the station's franchise. Cayetano pointed to Solicitor General Jose Calida and the National Telecommunications Commission (under the leadership of Gamaliel Cordoba) for ABS-CBN's subsequent closure, stating "the NTC appears to have succumbed to pressure from the Solicitor General and issued a cease and desist order to ABS-CBN." He warned, "as for the sudden flip-flopping of the NTC and the unconstitutional meddling by the Solicitor General in the business of Congress, I promise you, there will be a reckoning." In July 2020, ABS-CBN's attempt to renew the franchise was rejected by the Philippine House Committee on Legislative Franchises of the 18th Congress, which voted 70–11 to deny the application citing political reasons and several issues on the network's franchise. The denial of the ABS-CBN's franchise resulted in a massive retrenchment of its workers, permanent closure of the operations of numerous businesses, and network transfers and resignations by numerous talents, anchors and reporters. Cayetano and his allies were praised by Solicitor General Calida who claimed victory in silencing ABS-CBN.

In September 2020, Cayetano slammed the European Parliament's resolution urging to grant ABS-CBN a broadcast license because of its "outright interference" in Philippine affairs, claiming that the European Parliament criticized the Philippine government without first asking questions or ascertaining facts.

In his interview for "Hard Talk" with Boy Abunda, Cayetano stated that "if it were up to me, ABS-CBN would have been granted a provisional authority valid until October 31, 2020, to give the body more time to deliberate." The provisional authority was based on HB 6732, which Congressman Cayetano filed on May 13, 2020. President Rodrigo Duterte also admitted to using his "presidential powers" to shut down ABS-CBN and deny the renewal of franchise.

=== House leadership crisis and resignation, BTS sa Kongreso ===
Cayetano tendered his irrevocable resignation as House Speaker on October 13, 2020, paving the way for Marinduque representative Lord Allan Velasco to assume his position undisputed.

In January 2021, Cayetano formed a new bloc named "BTS sa Kongreso" — short for Balik sa Tamang Serbisyo sa Kongreso — along with fellow lawmakers Mike Defensor, LRay Villafuerte, Dan Fernandez, Raneo Abu, and Jose Antonio Sy-Alvarado.

In late March 2021, Cayetano launched two early political paid advertisements of himself which aired on all major Philippine television networks. One is on the campaign to approve a bill to give ₱10,000 cash aid to every Filipino family, while the other one portrayed Cayetano as an "ideal public servant."

=== 10K Ayuda Bill and initiative ===
Amid the COVID-19 pandemic, Cayetano and his allies from the BTS bloc filed in February 2021 House Bill 8597 otherwise known as the "10K Ayuda Bill". The measure seeks to provide each Filipino family with a one-time ₱10,000 assistance or ₱1,500 per family member, whichever is higher, which they can use for their daily needs or to start their own businesses as they await the full roll-out of COVID-19 vaccines.

In an attempt to prove that the government has the capacity to provide a ₱10,000 cash assistance to every Filipino family, Cayetano launched the Sampung Libong Pag-asa (SLP) program on his Facebook page in May. Through pooled resources from the BTS members and other private donors, the SLP initiative was held almost daily, reaching out to beneficiaries from different sectors across the country. In its daily program via Facebook live, SLP highlights the stories of beneficiaries who said the amount they received helped them rise up from the hardships they encountered when the country was placed under community quarantine. Four months after launching the program, the SLP reached 10,000 beneficiaries nationwide on September 10, 2021. In October, the number of beneficiaries rose to 12,762.

However, the 10K Ayuda Bill failed to be included in the Bayanihan 3 COVID-19 aid package and is still a legislative proposal yet to be acted upon.

=== Sari-Saring Pag-asa ===
Cayetano introduced the Sari-Saring Pag-asa (SSP) program, which aims to provide struggling sari-sari store owners with a one-time ₱3,500 cash assistance to replenish their supplies amid the pandemic. An advocate of small to medium enterprise empowerment, Cayetano initiated the program to complement the Sampung Libong Pag-asa program which provides select Filipino families with ₱10,000 in cash aid to help them with their basic needs and put up their own small businesses amid the pandemic.

SSP takes off from the Taguig Pateros (TaPat) Sari-Store Program created by Taguig 2nd District Rep. Lani Cayetano to provide financial assistance and livelihood training for sari-sari store owners in Taguig and Pateros. The local initiative was later expanded into the Sari-Sari Store Community, a national program that sought to create a community of sharing and mutual aid among sari-sari store owners from different parts of the country. As of October 27, 2021, the SSP has extended aid to a total of 4,811 sari-sari store owners from different parts of the country.

== Return to the Senate (2022–present) ==
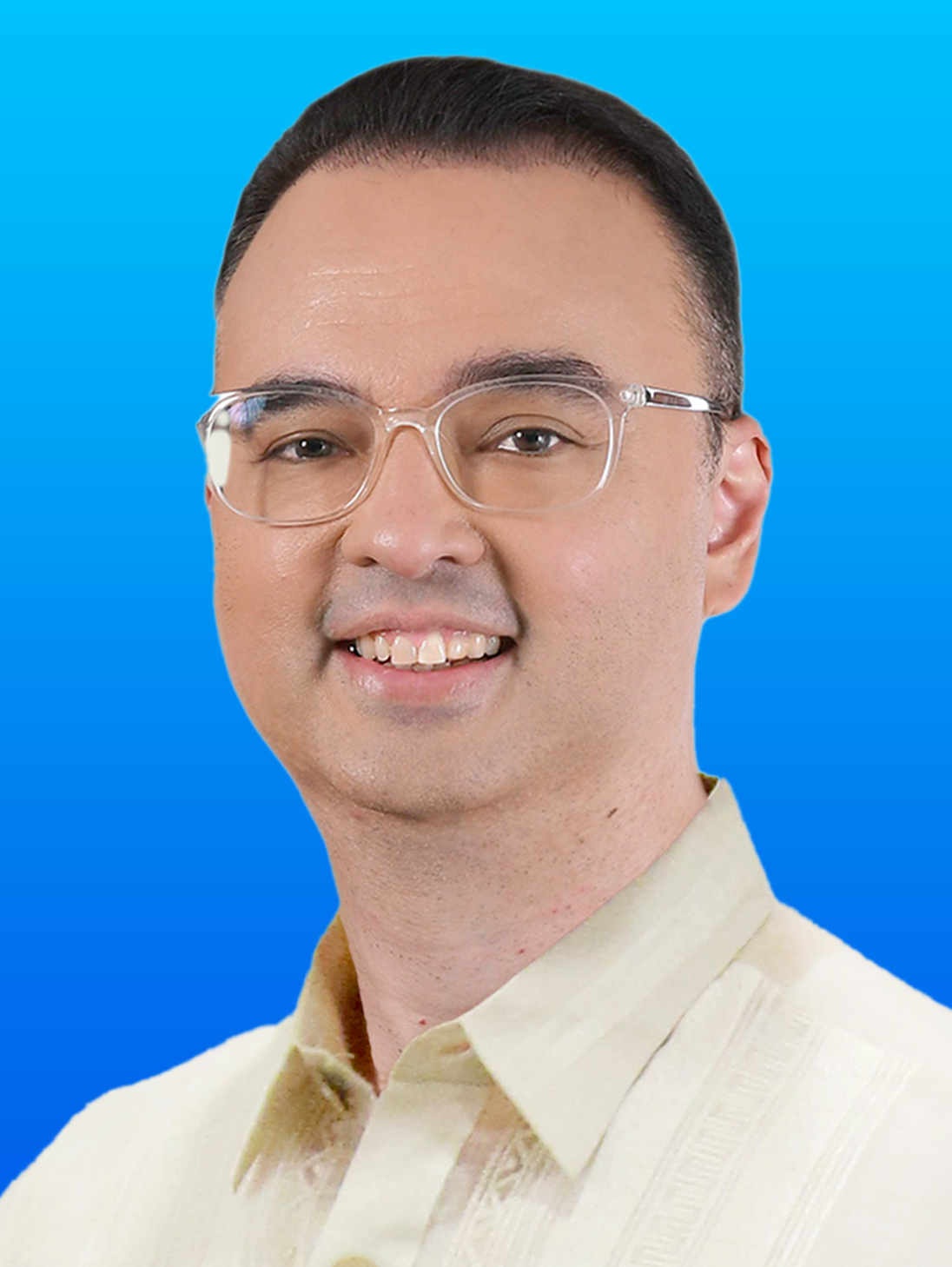
Cayetano's Commission on Appointments portrait for the 19th Congress

Cayetano hinted that he would 'seriously consider' running for President, wherein his focus would be the passage of the "10K Ayuda Bill" he and his allies from the BTS (Balik sa Tamang Serbisyo) sa Kongreso bloc filed in the lower house. The 10K Ayuda Bill seeks to provide each Filipino household a one-time ₱10,000 cash assistance amid the pandemic. He said he intended to draft a five-year economic recovery plan that can be adopted by the presidential candidates. Amid poor showings in presidential surveys, Cayetano was the top spender prior to the official campaign period, having run advertisements worth ₱610.4 million. On October 7, 2021, Cayetano filed his candidacy for senator as an independent candidate.

Cayetano won in the 2022 elections, placing seventh of the 12 winning candidates. Earning his third Senate term, he was the only winning senator not part of any coalitions. In the 19th Congress, he became part of the Senate independent bloc alongside his sister Pia.

In 2023, a Senate resolution to raise the issue of the Philippines' claim to the West Philippine Sea at the United Nations General Assembly was stalled by Cayetano. The resolution's sponsor, Senator Risa Hontiveros, stated that it was not the first time that Cayetano had refused to support the Philippines' claim against China.

=== 20th Congress (July 2025–present) ===
On July 3, 2025, Cayetano filed ten priority bills outlining a legislative agenda focused on strengthening government systems, promoting Filipino values, and supporting families and future generations. Topping the list is the Filipino Values in Identity Act, which aims to institutionalize a national program on values formation through a dedicated Commission on Filipino Values and an Inter-Faith Council.

On September 9, 2025, following leadership changes that saw Tito Sotto replacing Francis Escudero as the Senate President, Cayetano joined the minority bloc and became its floor leader.

Cayetano as a response to the flood control projects controversy proposed the conduct of a snap election and urged President Marcos, Vice President Duterte, and both chambers of the Congress to resign with "no incumbent from the above can run for one election cycle".

=== Tsinador and Pro-China positions ===
Cayetano has been referred as a Tsinador (Chinese senator) by critics for his pro-China political positions. He rejected being branded as Tsinador, yet he voted against a cross-party Senate resolution that condemned China's attacks on the Philippines and Filipino officials.

Cayetano was one of the main proponents and part of the so-called seven Tsinadors that aimed and failed to block the pro-Philippines resolution. The other senators who did not sign the pro-Philippines resolution were Robin Padilla, Pia Cayetano, Bato dela Rosa, Chiz Escudero, Bong Go, Rodante Marcoleta, Imee Marcos, and Joel Villanueva.

Analysts have pointed out how Cayetano questioned the behavior of the Philippine Coast Guard but has not made China accountable for its actions in the West Philippine Sea.

Various political statements from the past have also hounded Cayetano. He previously downplayed concerns after China's war threat against the Philippines. Cayetano personally met with various officials of the Chinese Communist Party, including Chinese president Xi Jinping, Chinese vice president Wang Qishan, and multiple Chinese ambassadors. Back in 2019, China supported and congratulated Cayetano when he was elected as House Speaker.

Cayetano is also supportive of Chinese ambassador Jing Quan, who released statements threatening the Philippines and its rights to the West Philippine Sea, as well spreading fake news against Filipino defense and elected officials.

Cayetano has previously disregarded the South China Sea Arbitration victory of the Philippines against China when he was foreign affairs secretary of former president Duterte, who called the arbitration victory a 'piece of paper' he will throw as trash. Cayetano is supportive of Duterte's daughter, vice president Sara, who is also known for her pro-China statements and has been implicated for receiving through her linked corporation P319 million in remittances from China and another P150 million siphoned as “donation” by the Chinese government to Duterte's Malasakit Foundation as confirmed by the Anti–Money Laundering Council (AMLC). The corporation involved has also been confirmed as linked to the Embassy of China.

=== Senate presidency (2026) ===
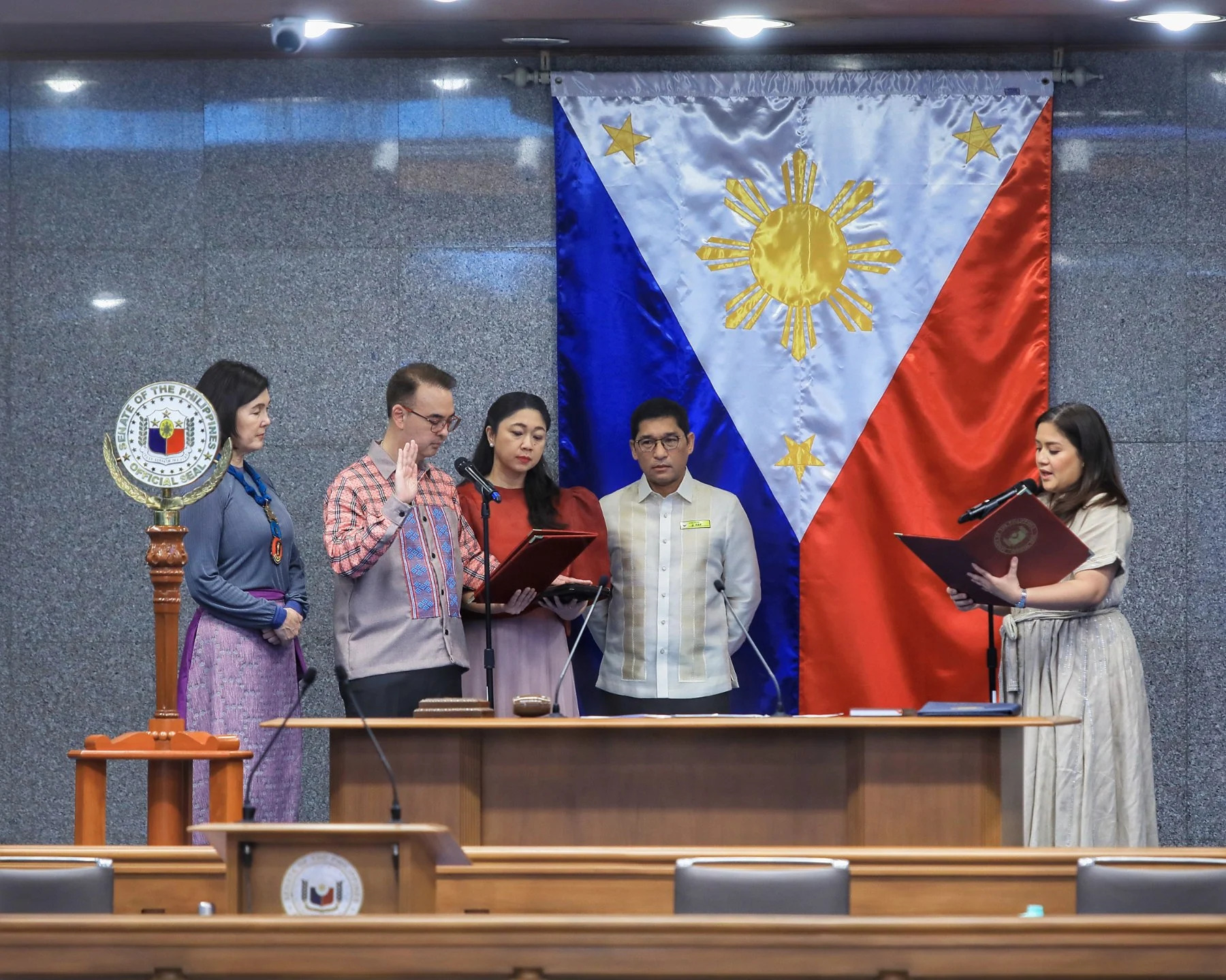
Cayetano takes his oath as the new Senate President on May 11, 2026

==== Election ====
Cayetano was elected as President of the Senate of the Philippines on May 11, 2026, replacing Tito Sotto after his group staged a controversial ouster plot. His election came after the House of Representatives voted to impeach Vice President Sara Duterte for the second time. Political analysts point out that the Cayetano-led Senate ouster was made to allegedly control the upcoming impeachment trial's narrative.

Two days later, his leadership faced a major crisis during the Senate lockdown, in which chaos and gunfire erupted in an attempt to arrest Senator Ronald dela Rosa by virtue of an International Criminal Court arrest warrant. Cayetano strongly condemned the operation, declaring that the Senate was "under attack" after approximately 27 shots were fired inside the complex.

==== 2026 Senate President controversy and shooting ====
The Facebook Live of Alan Peter Cayetano, stating that the Senate was "under attack", streamed on May 13, 2026. Official investigations later exposed that the shooting incident was staged, disproving Cayetano's claims

On May 13, 2026, the Senate attracted international attention for the first ever shooting incident within the premises of a Senate in recent history. Tensions escalated when gunfire was heard in the Senate during the supposed arrest of Senator Ronald dela Rosa. Later reports confirmed that it was the Office of the Sergeant-at-Arms (OSAA), under the control of Senate President Cayetano and led by Senate sergeant-at-arms Mao Aplasca, who first triggered the shooting incident. It was also confirmed that the OSAA was firing at walls and windows. The event has been tagged as a political stunt to divert attention, which later led to the escape of international fugitive and senator Ronald dela Rosa, a member of the Cayetano-led bloc wanted for crimes against humanity by the International Criminal Court.

Prior to the investations, Cayetano initially falsely claimed that the Senate was "under attack" in a Facebook livestream at 20:19 PHT, stating, "We have to turn off the lights dahil may putukan na nangyayari [because there is a shooting happening]." In the same livestream, Cayetano reported that officials were locked in their rooms, but he and other senators in the same room as him agreed not to leave the premises and Dela Rosa. Official investigations later disproved Cayetano's claims, and noted that the Senate was never under attack.

==== Removal from office ====
Following days of impasse, including Cayetano's refusal to go to work and an allegedly staged shooting incident organized by the Cayetano-led majority to help Senator Ronald dela Rosa escape a warrant of arrest from the International Criminal Court, the minority led by Senator Sherwin Gatchalian successfully ousted Cayetano through the Avelino v. Cuenco ruling and other precedence on June 3, leading to Gatchalian's election as Senate president pro tempore and later as Senate president. Cayetano's Senate presidency is the second shortest in Philippine history.

On June 17, weeks after his ouster, Cayetano finally conceded the majority to the Gatchalian-led faction.

=== Post-Senate presidency ===
On July 2026, the National Bureau of Investigation launched a probe on the flood control projects associated with Cayetano, as well as his role during the controversial 2019 SEA Games where billions of pesos were involved. During the investigations, it was revealed that in 2022 alone, Cayetano's flood control projects were given to the top 15 anomalous contractors named during the previous flood control controversy investigations. On the same month, senator Panfilo Lacson exposed that Cayetano was involved in multiple anomalous flood control projects in Taguig City, where many of the projects were given two payments for a single project. The documentary photos used for multiple different projects were also revealed to have been just one project. Among the projects identified were a PHP94-million flood control project in Barangay Lower Bicutan implemented by the Department of Public Works and Highways (DPWH), a PHP49.9-million multipurpose building at the Lakeshore Complex reclamation site, a PHP94-million Laguna Lakeshore improvement project, and two flood mitigation rehabilitation projects worth about PHP141.8 million each at Phases 4 and 5, among others. The evidences gathered by Lacson were afterwards submitted to the Ombudsman. Fisherfolk communities in Taguig and Laguna de Bay have lend their support towards the investigations as the illegal reclamation projects of Cayetano have severely affected their livelihoods. Through a middleman, Cayetano afterwards asked Lacson for a "ceasefire", which Lacson ultimately rejected. Prior to the revelations, Cayetano previously claimed that he wanted to investigate anomalous flood control projects in the country himself.

On August 9, 2026, it was exposed that the two Cayetano siblings, Alan and Pia, had billions of budget insertions in 2025. Alan Cayetano's insertions amounted to at least ₱6.7B while Pia's amounted to at least ₱4.7B. The 2025 budget has been named as the most corrupt national budget in Philippine history.

== Other ventures ==
Cayetano and his sister Pia also served as the titular hosts of public service program Cayetano in Action with Boy Abunda (CIA with BA), which premiered in February 2023 on GMA Network.

== Personal life ==
Cayetano married Maria Laarni "Lani" Lopez in March 2004.

Cayetano is a born-again Christian. During a Senate hearing by the Committee on Foreign Relations investigating the arrest of Rodrigo Duterte in 2025, Cayetano introduced himself by stating, "More than being Alan Cayetano, or a senator, a former secretary of foreign affairs, [...] I believe I am an ambassador of the Lord Jesus Christ", which received criticism.

=== Citizenship ===
On March 8, 2007, former Pateros mayor Jose Capco filed electoral disqualification during the mid-term elections of 2007. Capco presented Cayetano's Alien Certificate of Registration dated March 18, 1976, and a renewed certificate dated January 23, 1985, which Capco claimed Cayetano himself applied for at the Bureau of Immigration. In his complaint, Capco alleged that Cayetano was an American citizen, and that he was disqualified from holding public office in the Philippines. Justice Secretary Raul M. Gonzalez also confirmed that his department records would show Cayetano holding US citizenship.

On April 19, 2007, the Commission on Elections (COMELEC) 2nd Division ruled en banc that Cayetano is a natural-born citizen, as he was born in the Philippines, and that his father is a natural-born Filipino citizen.

Ten years later, on March 16, 2017, Cayetano's citizenship was asked once more by Inquirer columnist and Filipino-American lawyer Rodel Rodis, in response to a Wikipedia list of former US Citizen which included Cayetano and his siblings. Cayetano responded by calling the column a hatchet job, defamation, and fake news. He claimed, "To answer your headline: No I am not an American citizen; I never chose to be an American citizen." A week later Cayetano clarified that he was born Filipino-American holding both citizenship, and he relinquished his American citizenship in 1998.

== Electoral history ==
Electoral history of Alan Peter Cayetano
Year	Office	Party	Votes received				Result
Year	Office	Party	Total	%	P.	Swing	Result
1998	Representative (Taguig–Pateros)	Liberal	104,491	62.33%	1st	—N/a	Won
2001	Representative (Taguig–Pateros)	Lakas	—N/a	—N/a	1st	—N/a	Won
2004	Representative (Taguig–Pateros)	Nacionalista	—N/a	—N/a	1st	—N/a	Won
2019	Representative (Taguig–Pateros–1st)	Nacionalista	91,993	58.75%	1st	—N/a	Won
2007	Senator of the Philippines	Nacionalista	11,787,679	39.96%	9th	—N/a	Won
2013	Senator of the Philippines	Nacionalista	17,580,813	43.79%	3rd	+3.83	Won
2022	Senator of the Philippines	Independent	19,295,314	34.74%	7th	−9.05	Won
2016	Vice President of the Philippines	Independent	5,903,379	14.38%	3rd	—N/a	Lost

== Notes ==
Political offices
Preceded by Daniel Castillo	Vice Mayor of Taguig; 1995-1998	Succeeded by Loida Labao-Alzona
Preceded by Enrique Manalo; Acting	Secretary of Foreign Affairs; 2017-2018	Succeeded by Teodoro Locsin Jr.
House of Representatives of the Philippines
Preceded by Dante Tiñga	Member of the Philippine House of Representatives from Taguig–Pateros; 1998–2007	District dissolved
Preceded by Arnel Cerafica	Member of the Philippine House of Representatives from Taguig–Pateros's 1st district 2019–2022	Succeeded by Ricardo Cruz Jr.
Preceded by Gloria Macapagal Arroyo	Speaker of the House of Representatives of the Philippines; 2019–2020	Succeeded by Lord Allan Velasco
Senate of the Philippines
Preceded by Joker Arroyo	Chair of the Philippine Senate; Blue Ribbon Committee; 2007–2009	Succeeded by Richard J. Gordon
Preceded by Aquilino Pimentel Jr.	Minority Floor Leader of the Senate of the Philippines; 2010–2013	Succeeded by Juan Ponce Enrile
Preceded by Gregorio Honasan; Acting	Majority Floor Leader of the Senate of the Philippines; 2013–2016	Succeeded by Vicente Sotto III
Preceded by Gregorio Honasan	Chair of the Philippine Senate; Agrarian Reform Committee; 2016–2017	Succeeded by Cynthia Villar
Preceded by Miriam Defensor Santiago	Chair of the Philippine Senate; Foreign Relations Committee; 2016–2017	Succeeded by Loren Legarda
Preceded by Koko Pimentel	Chair of the Philippine Senate; Justice and Human Rights; 2025	Succeeded by Kiko Pangilinan
Preceded by Mark Villar	Chair of the Philippine Senate; Banks, Financial Institutions and Currencies; 2025	Succeeded by Joel Villanueva
Preceded by Tito Sotto	Minority Floor Leader of the Senate of the Philippines; 2025–2026	Succeeded by Tito Sotto
Preceded by Tito Sotto	President of the Senate of the Philippines; 2026	Succeeded by Win Gatchalian
