= Pia Cayetano =

Senator of the Philippines since 2019 (born 1966)

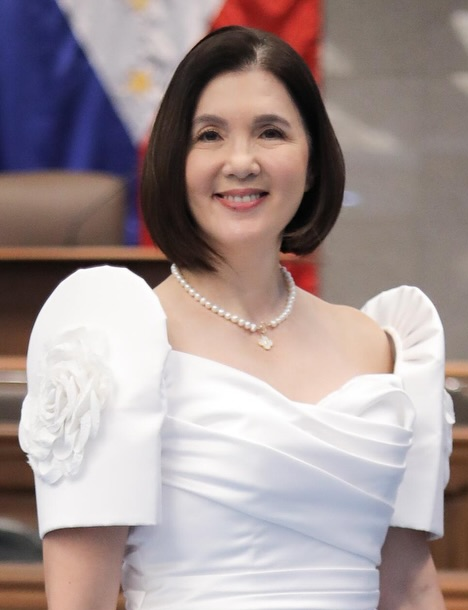
- Cayetano in 2025

Senator of the Philippines
- Incumbent
- Assumed office June 30, 2019
- In office June 30, 2004 – June 30, 2016

Chair of the Senate Sustainable Development Goals, Innovation and Futures Thinking Committee
- Incumbent
- Assumed office September 3, 2019

Chair of the Senate Blue Ribbon Committee
- In office May 20, 2026 – June 3, 2026
- Preceded by: Panfilo Lacson
- Succeeded by: Erwin Tulfo
- In office January 22, 2024 – June 30, 2025
- Preceded by: Francis Tolentino
- Succeeded by: Rodante Marcoleta

Chair of the Senate Ways and Means Committee
- In office July 28, 2025 – June 3, 2026
- Preceded by: Sherwin Gatchalian
- Succeeded by: Panfilo Lacson

Deputy Speaker of the House of Representatives of the Philippines
- In office August 15, 2016 – June 30, 2019
- Speaker: Pantaleon Alvarez; Gloria Macapagal Arroyo

Member of the Philippine House of Representatives from Taguig–Pateros' 2nd congressional district
- In office June 30, 2016 – June 30, 2019
- Preceded by: Lino Cayetano
- Succeeded by: Lani Cayetano

Personal details
- Born: Pilar Juliana Schramm Cayetano; March 22, 1966 (age 60) Ann Arbor, Michigan, U.S.
- Citizenship: Philippines
- Party: Nacionalista (2007–present)
- Other political affiliations: Lakas–CMD (until 2007)
- Children: 4
- Parent: Rene Cayetano (father)
- Relatives: Alan Peter Cayetano (brother); Lino Cayetano (brother); Lani Cayetano (sister-in-law); Fille Cayetano (sister-in-law)
- Education: University of the Philippines Diliman (BA, LL.B)
- Occupation: Politician; businesswoman
- Profession: Lawyer; economist
- Website: Official website

Pilar Juliana "Pia" Schramm Cayetano (Tagalog: [ˈpija kajɛˈtano]; born March 22, 1966), also known as Pia Compañera Cayetano, is a Filipino politician, lawyer, economist, and television host serving as a senator since 2019, a position she previously held from 2004 to 2016. She was also the representative of Taguig's 2nd district from 2016 to 2019 and was one of the deputy speakers. Cayetano is a member of the Nacionalista Party.

Cayetano was born to a political family currently based in Taguig. Her father was the late former senator Rene Cayetano; her younger brother, Alan Peter, is a fellow incumbent senator who formerly represented the Taguig–Pateros district and became Speaker of the House of Representatives of the Philippines during the 18th Congress; another younger brother, Rene Carl, is a former councilor of Muntinlupa; her youngest brother, Lino, was mayor of Taguig; and her sister-in-law, Lani, is the incumbent mayor of Taguig.

Cayetano authored the Expanded Senior Citizens Act, Expanded Breastfeeding Promoting Act, the Responsible Parenthood and Reproductive Health Act of 2012, and the Philippine Offshore Gaming Operators (POGO) Law. She earned her economics (cum laude) and law degrees at the University of the Philippines, where she played volleyball for the UP Lady Maroons team that won the 1983 UAAP title. She has also played for the national women's volleyball team. Cayetano is also a triathlete. She is currently one of the hosts of the GMA public service program Cayetano in Action with Boy Abunda.

== Early life and education ==
Cayetano was born on March 22, 1966 to Filipino lawyer Renato "Compañero" Cayetano, who would later become Senator, and kindergarten teacher Sandra Schramm, an American of German ethnicity from Michigan.

Cayetano took up Bachelor of Arts in economics at the University of the Philippines Diliman, and graduated cum laude in 1985. She then took up Bachelor of Laws at the UP College of Law, graduating in 1991 with academic distinction, #7 in her class. She also became a member of the Honor Society, Order of the Purple Feather.

== Legal career ==
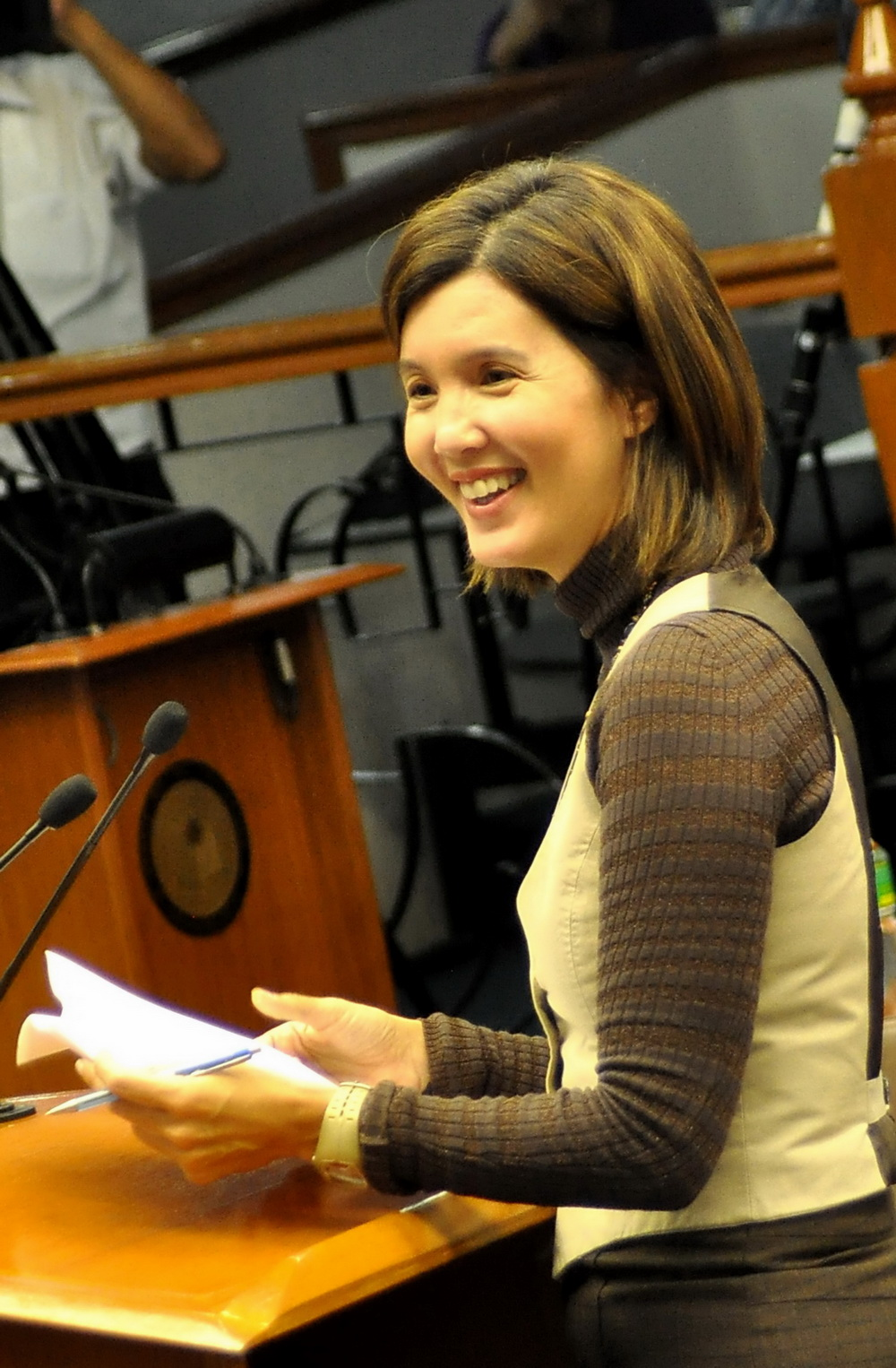
Cayetano at the Senate session in 2010

From 1992 to 1995, Cayetano was an associate lawyer at the Castillo, Laman Tan, and Pantaleon Law Offices, specializing in corporate and intellectual property law. From 1996 to 1999, she was an officer for the legal and corporate affairs of the Belle Corporation and its affiliates, including the gaming conglomerate BW Resources Corp. that was involved in a 1999 price manipulation scandal. In 2000, she was general counsel for the Philweb Corporation. In 2001, she was appointed chairwoman of the Maxi Group of Companies, a retailer and distributor of educational toys, infant apparel and accessories. In 2012, she opened her own cafe, Slice, at Bonifacio High Street in Taguig.

Cayetano and her brother Alan Peter are the titular hosts of public service program Cayetano in Action with Boy Abunda (CIA with BA), which premiered in February 2023 on GMA Network.

== Political career ==
Following the death of her father, Senator Renato Cayetano, due to liver cancer on June 25, 2003, several legislators, including senators, encouraged Pia Cayetano to run for office. As a result, she ran for a Senate seat in the 2004 elections under the support of President Gloria Macapagal Arroyo. Cayetano ran under the pro-Arroyo coalition called Koalisyon ng Katapatan at Karanasan para sa Kinabukasan (K-4). Initially, she was a virtual unknown to the electorate, but with the liberalization of political advertisements, she gained popularity with her TV advertisement as a runner, cyclist, and triathlete and as a new host of her father's TV program Compañero y Compañera for a short stint. She won in the elections, landing in the sixth position.

In 2006, she and her brother Alan had a fallout against President Arroyo and First Gentleman Mike Arroyo who called the Cayetano siblings “ungrateful”. This stemmed from allegations of then Taguig Pateros Rep. Alan that the Arroyos kept a secret multi-million-dollar German bank account. It was later revealed that the Arroyo government helped bankroll the Cayetano siblings' political campaigns, which Pia later admitted.

During the 112th Inter-Parliamentary Union (IPU) Assembly in Manila, Cayetano was elected president of the 10th Meeting of Women Parliamentarians during the sidelines of the annual meeting. On April 17, 2008, she was elected for a two-year term, president of the Committee of Women Parliamentarians of the Inter-Parliamentary Union (IPU) during its 118th General Assembly in Cape Town, South Africa. As the first Filipino and Asian to head it, she ran unopposed and took over from Uruguay's Mónica Xavier. This is the highest position held by any Filipino or Asian in the history of the IPU. In 2009, she criticized President Arroyo for a 1 million-worth dinner in New York City.

In the 2010 presidential elections, Cayetano backed the presidential bid of Manny Villar while she was running for reelection as a guest candidate under the Nacionalista Party. She won, landing in sixth place.

During this period, senators Pia Cayetano and Alan Peter Cayetano channeled a large amount of pork barrel funds to Taguig City where Pia Cayetano's sister-in-law Lani Cayetano was serving as mayor. Pia Cayetano and Alan Peter Cayetano were the biggest pork spenders in the Senate, having spent ₱277,006,092 and ₱256,700,000 of their pork barrel in 2012 as revealed during the pork barrel scandal investigations.

Cayetano pushed for the enactment of the ‘Magna Carta of Women,’ which seeks to end all forms of gender discrimination, and the ‘Expanded Breastfeeding Act,’ which establishes lactation stations in the workplace to encourage nursing mothers to continue breastfeeding even at work.

Cayetano is likewise credited for the passage of the ‘Expanded Senior Citizens Act,’ which allowed the elderly to fully enjoy the 20-percent senior citizens discount by exempting their purchases of medicines and other vital services from the 12-percent Value Added Tax.

She was responsible for passing the ‘Food and Drugs Administration (FDA) Law’ and the ‘Universally Accessible Cheaper and Quality Medicines Law,’ both of which seek to strengthen state mechanisms to ensure safe and affordable quality drugs for all. She also authored or co-authored the Foster Care Act (RA 10165), Mandatory Infants and Children Health Immunization Act (RA 10152), Expanded Breastfeeding Promotion Act (RA 10028), Establishment of Persons with Disability Affairs Office Act (RA 10070), National Anti-Rabies Act (RA 9482), and the Environmental Awareness and Education Act (RA 9512).

Cayetano worked for the passage of two landmark laws, the Reproductive Health Act (RA 10354), for which she was the principal sponsor, and the Sin Tax Reform Act (RA 10351) which sought to fund government health programs from tax proceeds from cigarettes and alcohol products.

In 2016, she backed the presidential bid of Rodrigo Duterte while she was running for congresswoman. Cayetano won as congresswoman of Taguig City's second district. She would later be named one of twelve Deputy Speakers of the House of Representatives under the 17th Congress, while formally allying herself with the pro-Duterte faction of former President and then-congresswoman Gloria Macapagal Arroyo, who she previously criticized for years.

After a series of misogynistic acts and statements from President Duterte, including catcalling a female reporter, boasting about illicit affairs, making derogatory comments about women, making a controversial joke about rape, and commenting on the appearance of Vice President Leni Robredo, among others, Pia Cayetano defended Duterte, stating that foul language was “simply the way he speaks” and that “boys will be boys”. Cayetano also added that “you can’t be a manang [old woman]” if you want to belong to their circle. Various women's groups have slammed Cayetano for enabling misogyny under Duterte, stating “We cannot allow women [such as Pia Cayetano] who pretend to be for women and then enable misogynists in positions of power.”

Analysts have pointed out that during this era, Cayetano promoted a “passive-go-with-the-flow permissiveness” that has “subtly enabled the debasement of women and allows perpetrators (who are not limited to men) to get away with it”. Analysts also magnified the "opportunistic gender politics" of Cayetano, which she uses only to serve her agenda, while sidelining the rights of other women when situations do not benefit her political future.

During the brutal Philippine drug war undertaken by President Duterte, Cayetano was criticized for her silence even after thousands of civilian women and children, many of whom were not involved in drugs, were branded as criminals without due process and slaughtered. Her silence was viewed by many as complicity, damaging her reputation as a self-described “rights advocate.” She was also accused of having the “familiar narcissist egomania of her younger brother [Alan]”.

In 2019, she ran for a comeback to the Senate under the Hugpong ng Pagbabago coalition under President Duterte. She was successful, placing fourth and thus securing her third term. She was named chair of the Senate Sustainable Development Goals, Innovation and Futures Thinking Committee in 2019.

In 2020, Cayetano blocked the Senate probe of senator Risa Hontiveros who sought to investigate irregular deals surrounding the controversial 2019 SEA Games, especially the questionable P9.5 billion in taxpayer money used to construct the overpriced main sports venue inside New Clark City, which has been flagged previously, along with a cauldron worth P50 million, by independent media investigations. The 2019 Sea Games was spearheaded by her brother, then-Taguig representative Alan Peter Cayetano, who would later be investigated in 2026 by the National Bureau of Investigation for alleged irregularities.

In 2021, Cayetano principally sponsored and authored the Philippine Offshore Gaming Operators (POGO) Law, which effectively legalized questionable POGO activities across the country. POGOs have previously been flagged by senator Risa Hontiveros for tax evasion and other illegal activities since 2018. Later investigations by Hontiveros in 2024 found that POGOs legalized by Cayetano's law also indulged in fake citizenships, murders, torture, illegal detentions, drug use, prostitution, slavery, and money laundering, among others. POGOs were later banned in 2025 after the Senate investigations led by Hontiveros.

Cayetano became the first female chair of the Senate Blue Ribbon Committee in 2024. As part of the Senate Blue Ribbon Committee, she, along with Aquilino Pimentel III led a senate hearing on Rodrigo Duterte's war on drugs in October 2024, however, the investigations did not yield results as Duterte is her political ally. In 2024, she defended the Senate Bill No. 2793, or the Philippine Natural Gas Industry Development Act, which aims to develop the Philippine natural gas industry.

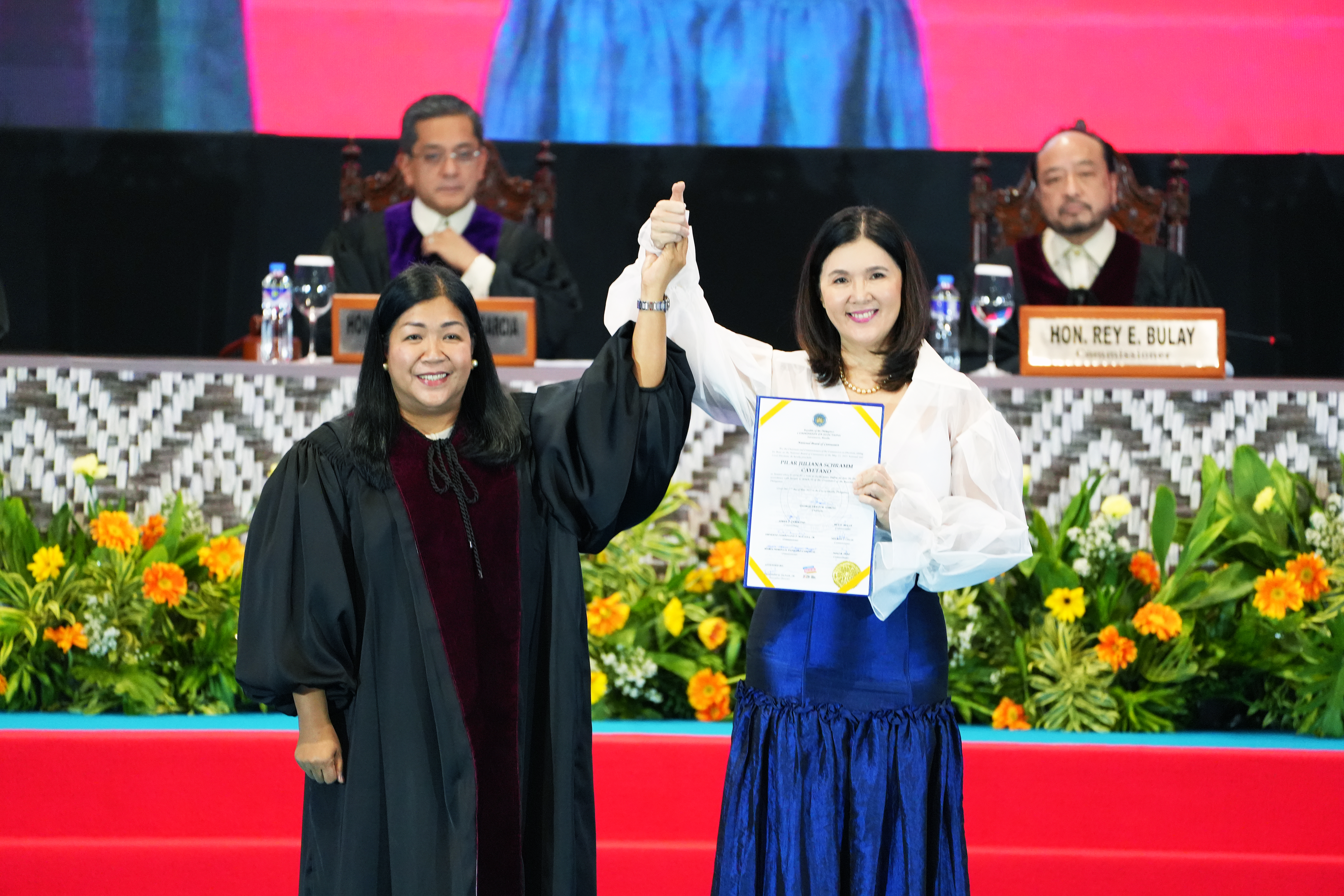
Cayetano being proclaimed as a senator-elect on May 17, 2025

In 2025, Cayetano successfully ran for re-election in the Senate under the Alyansa para sa Bagong Pilipinas slate of President Bongbong Marcos. She was the third highest spender among the senatorial candidates, having spent ₱162 million during the official campaign period, after ranking precariously in pre-election surveys. After the elections, independent media investigations found that some of Cayetano's election campaign contributors were government contractors, which is illegal under Philippine law.

During the flood control scandal probe, the Senate Blue Ribbon Committee finished its flood control report, but multiple senators, including Pia and her brother Alan, refused to sign it, which effectively blocked further investigations in the Senate. Months later, it was exposed that the Cayetanos were involved in multiple ghost and anomalous flood control projects and illegal reclamation projects in Taguig City, amounting to billions of pesos. Prior to the revelations, her brother Alan initially claimed that they wanted to investigate the scandal themselves.

On May 20, 2026, she was re-appointed as a chair of the Senate Blue Ribbon Committee for a few days under the short-lived Senate presidency of her brother Alan Peter Cayetano. During which, she became infamous as the crying lady, after a controversial speech where analysts say comes from her misunderstanding of previous statements from fellow senator Risa Hontiveros. Various laugh memes went viral with the phrase, "Kumusta ka, Pia?" due to her speech.

On June 30, 2026, various civil society groups, including women's groups, filed an ethics complaint against her after she posted a spliced video in Facebook spreading fake news that favored the defense team of Sara Duterte and altered what actually happened during Duterte's impeachment trial. The complete actual footage shows law dean Chel Diokno schooling her of what the law actually states.

On August 9, 2026, it was exposed that the two Cayetano siblings, Pia and Alan, had billions of budget insertions in 2025. Pia Cayetano's insertions amounted to at least ₱4.7B while Alan's amounted to at least ₱6.7B. The 2025 budget was named as the most corrupt budget in Philippine history.

=== Controversies ===
She has been embroiled in various controversies, becoming one of the largest pork barrel spenders during the 2013 pork barrel scandal, a defender of President Duterte's controversial Philippine drug war and his misogynystic remarks against women, the chief architect in the Senate for the legalization of the controversial Philippine offshore gaming operators (POGOs), the main senator to block Senate investigations on the millions of stolen money during the 2019 SEA Games, one of the senators who blocked and refused to sign the Senate Blue Ribbon Committee report on the flood control scandal where her family was allegedly involved in anomalous projects worth billions of pesos, a fake news peddler in Facebook, one of the senators involved in the fake shooting incident in the Senate, and one of the politicians who had insertions, specifically ₱4.7 billion, in the 2025 national budget, the initial ratified version of which had been alleged by economist Cielo Magno as the most corrupt in Philippine history.

== Personal life ==
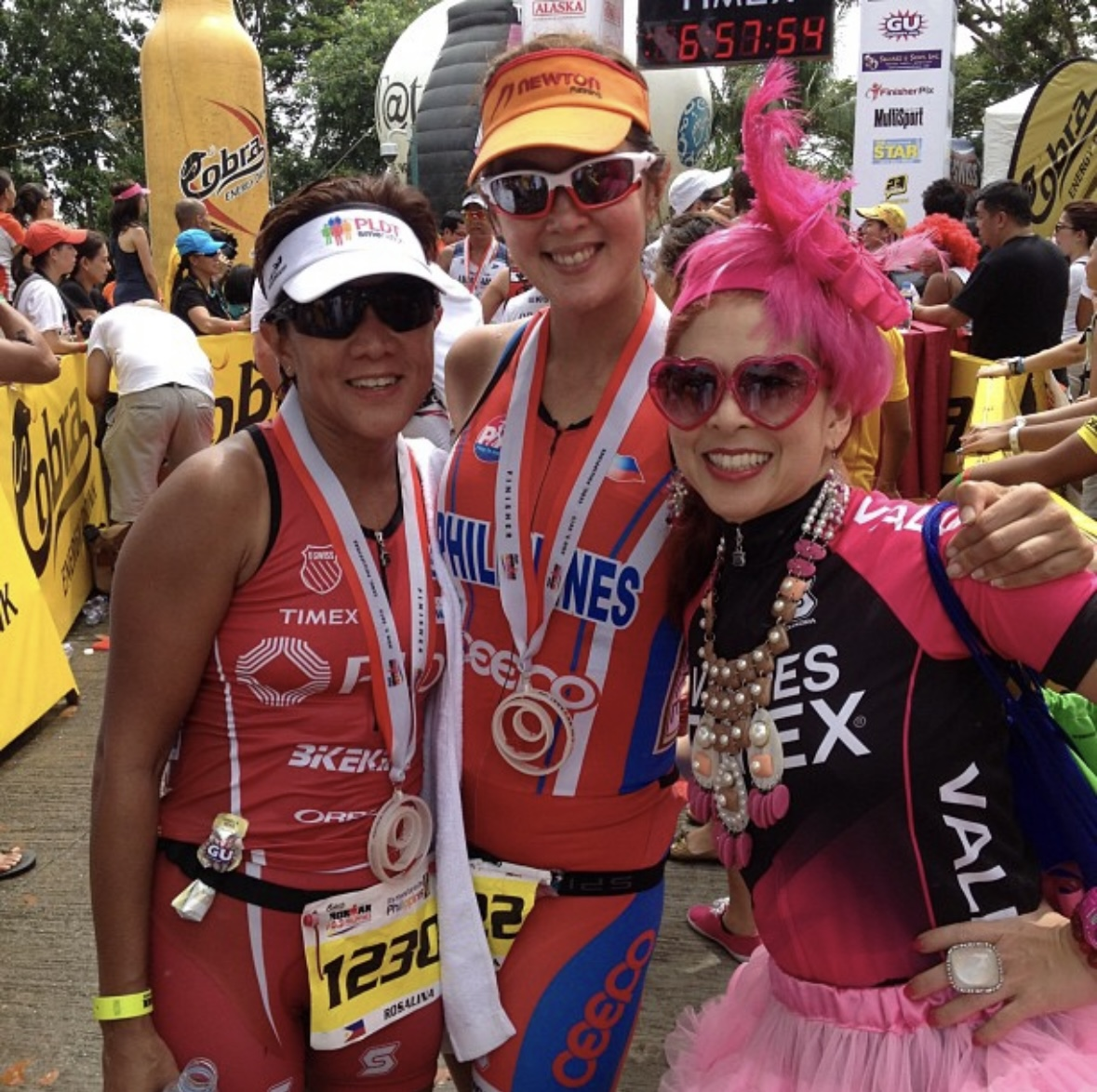
Cayetano (center) with media personality Tessa Prieto-Valdes (right) at the Ironman 70.3 finish line in 2012.

Pia Cayetano is an advocate of sports as part of a holistic youth development program, prevention of diseases, and the need for a healthy and fit lifestyle. She is the founder of Gabriel Symphony Foundation which was established following the death of her son Gabriel, who was diagnosed with multiple congenital anomalies. The foundation helps children with disabilities and life-threatening ailments.

She has three siblings: Alan Peter, an incumbent Senator who formerly served as the Secretary of Foreign Affairs, Speaker of the House of Representatives, and President of the Senate of the Philippines; Rene Carl, a former councilor of Muntinlupa and the owner of the collectible figurine store "Maxicollector"; and Lino Edgardo, a television and film director, former barangay chairman of Barangay Fort Bonifacio in Taguig, former congressional representative of the second district of Taguig, and former Mayor of Taguig. Cayetano is a mother to two daughters, Maxine and Nadine, and a son Gabriel, who died from complications of a rare chromosomal disorder in 2001. She is also a foster parent to Rene Lucas.

She is also the founder of the Compañero Rene Cayetano Foundation in memory of her father, which helps the underprivileged in the areas of health, education, and environment, as well as Pinay In Action (PIA), which promotes health, fitness, and women empowerment.

== Electoral history ==
Electoral history of Pia Cayetano
Year	Office	Party	Votes received				Result
Year	Office	Party	Total	%	P.	Swing	Result
2004	Senator of the Philippines	Lakas–CMD	12,542,054	35.32%	6th	—N/a	Won
2010	Senator of the Philippines	Nacionalista	13,679,511	35.86%	6th	+0.54	Won
2019	Senator of the Philippines	Nacionalista	19,789,019	41.84%	4th	+5.98	Won
2025	Senator of the Philippines	Nacionalista	14,573,430	25.41%	9th	-16.43	Won
2016	Representative (Taguig–2nd)	Nacionalista	93,813	69.38%	1st	—N/a	Won
