= Chairperson of the Metropolitan Manila Development Authority =

Government role in the Philippines

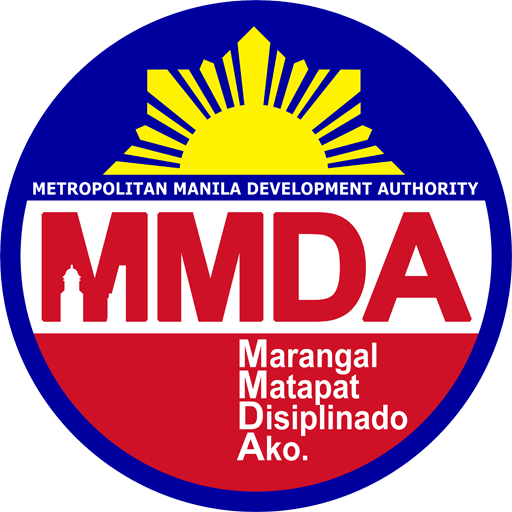

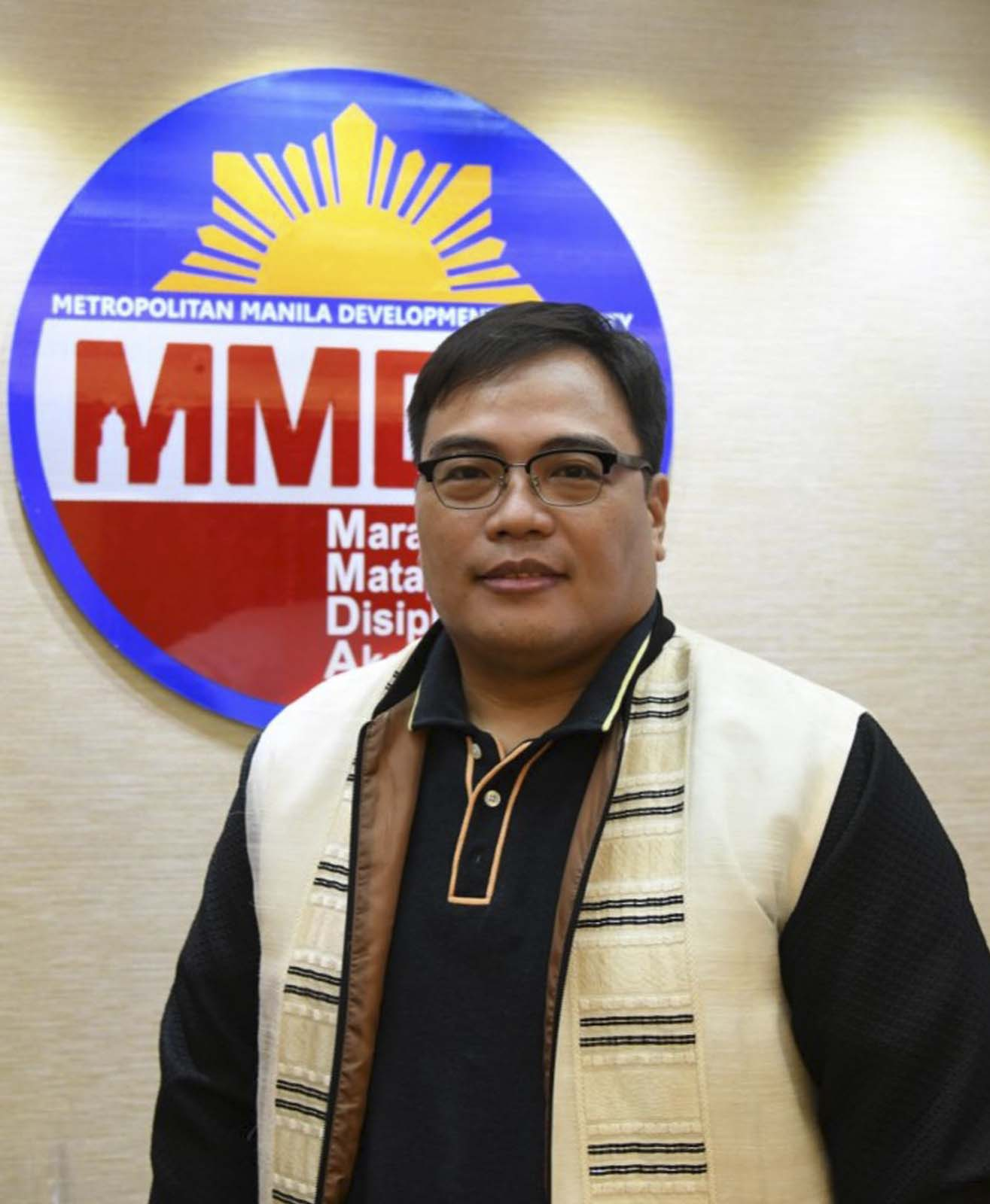
- Incumbent; Atty. Romando S. Artes since November 1, 2022
- Office of the President
- Member of: MMDA Executive Council
- Seat: Pasig, Philippines (since 2022); Makati, Philippines (until 2022)
- Appointer: President of the Philippines
- Term length: At the president's pleasure
- Inaugural holder: Jejomar Binay (Metropolitan Manila Authority); Prospero Oreta (Metropolitan Manila Development Authority)
- Formation: January 9, 1990 (as Chairperson of the Metropolitan Manila Authority); June 30, 1994 (as Chairperson of the Metropolitan Manila Development Authority)
- Website: https://mmda.gov.ph

The chairperson of the Metropolitan Manila Development Authority is the chief executive officer of the Metropolitan Manila Development Authority (MMDA) and the presiding officer of the Metro Manila Council.

== Eligibility ==
The chairperson of the MMDA is appointed by the president of the Philippines. The appointment of the chairperson is subject to the same disqualifications and prohibitions of a member of the Cabinet but not subject for a confirmation from the Commission on Appointments.

== Functions ==
The chairperson of the MMDA is also the presiding officer of the Metro Manila Council. The chairperson is tasked to execute the policies and measures approved by the Metro Manila Council as well as oversee the management and operations of the MMDA.

== List of chairpersons ==
=== Metropolitan Manila Authority ===
#	Portrait	Name	Term	President
1		Jejomar Binay	January 9, 1990 – June 30, 1991 (1 year, 180 days)	Corazon Aquino
2		Ignacio Bunye	June 30, 1991 – June 30, 1992 (1 year, 0 days)	Corazon Aquino
3		Mel Mathay	June 30, 1992 – June 30, 1994 (2 years, 0 days)	Fidel V. Ramos

=== Metropolitan Manila Development Authority ===
#	Portrait	Name	Term	President
1		Prospero Oreta	June 30, 1994 – June 30, 1998 (4 years, 0 days)	Fidel V. Ramos
2		Jejomar Binay	June 30, 1998 – January 20, 2001 (2 years, 204 days)	Joseph Ejercito Estrada
3		Benjamin Abalos	January 20, 2001 – June 10, 2002 (1 year, 141 days)	Gloria Macapagal Arroyo
4		Bayani Fernando	June 18, 2002 – November 25, 2009 (7 years, 7 days)	Gloria Macapagal Arroyo
5		Oscar Inocentes	November 25, 2009 – July 27, 2010 (214 days)	Gloria Macapagal Arroyo
5		Oscar Inocentes	November 25, 2009 – July 27, 2010 (214 days)	Benigno S. Aquino III
6		Francis Tolentino	July 27, 2010 – October 7, 2015 (5 years, 102 days)	Benigno S. Aquino III
Emerson Carlos was Officer-In Charge from October 7 – 30, 2015 (23 days)				Benigno S. Aquino III
7		Emerson Carlos	October 30, 2015 – June 30, 2016 (244 days)	Benigno S. Aquino III
7		Emerson Carlos	July 8, 2016 – August 19, 2016 (42 days)	Rodrigo Duterte
Thomas Orbos was Officer-In Charge from August 22, 2016 – May 21, 2017 (272 days)				Rodrigo Duterte
8		Danilo Lim	May 22, 2017 – January 6, 2021 (3 years, 229 days) (Note: Died in office)	Rodrigo Duterte
9		Benhur Abalos	January 10, 2021 – February 7, 2022 (1 year, 28 days)	Rodrigo Duterte
Romando S. Artes was Officer-In Charge from February 7, 2022 – March 1, 2022 (22 days)				Rodrigo Duterte
10		Romando Artes	March 1, 2022 – June 30, 2022 (121 days)	Rodrigo Duterte
Engr. Baltazar N. Melgar was Officer-In Charge from June 30, 2022 – August 1, 2022 (32 days)				Bongbong Marcos
*		Carlo Dimayuga III (Acting)	August 1, 2022 – October 31, 2022 (91 days)	Bongbong Marcos
*		Romando Artes	November 1, 2022 (acting) – September 24, 2024 (acting) (1 year, 328 days)	Bongbong Marcos
(10)		Romando Artes	September 24, 2024 – present (2 years, 27 days)	Bongbong Marcos

== See also ==
- Governor of Metro Manila
