= Philippine Senate Committee on Urban Planning, Housing and Resettlement =

Standing committee of the Senate of the Philippines

Committee on Urban Planning, Housing and Resettlement
- Senate of the Philippines; 20th Congress

History
- New session started: July 28, 2025

Leadership
- Chairman: Francis Escudero (NPC) since September 15, 2025

Structure
- Seats: 11
- Political groups: Majority (7): Nacionalista (2); NPC (2); Akbayan (1); KANP (1); Independent (1); Minority (4): NPC (1); PDP (1); Independent (2)

The Philippine Senate Committee on Urban Planning, Housing and Resettlement is a standing committee of the Senate of the Philippines.

== Jurisdiction ==
According to the Rules of the Senate, the committee handles all matters relating to urban land reform, planning, housing, resettlement and urban community development.

== Members, 20th Congress ==
Based on the Rules of the Senate, the Senate Committee on Urban Planning, Housing and Resettlement has 11 members.

Position	Member	Party
Chairperson	Francis Escudero	NPC
Vice Chairpersons	JV Ejercito (Note: Also serving as the deputy majority leader alongside Risa Hontiveros (Akbayan).)	NPC
Vice Chairpersons	Bong Go	PDP
Vice Chairpersons	Camille Villar	Nacionalista
Deputy Majority Leader	Risa Hontiveros	Akbayan
Members for the Majority	Bam Aquino	KANP
Members for the Majority	Pia Cayetano	Nacionalista
Members for the Majority	Loren Legarda	NPC
Members for the Majority	Raffy Tulfo	Independent
Deputy Minority Leaders	Rodante Marcoleta	Independent
Deputy Minority Leaders	Joel Villanueva	Independent

Ex officio members:

- Senate President pro tempore Panfilo Lacson
- Majority Floor Leader Juan Miguel Zubiri
- Minority Floor Leader Alan Peter Cayetano

Committee secretary: Himerio Jose Dl. Garcia IV

== Historical membership rosters ==
=== 18th Congress ===
Position	Member	Party
Chairperson	Francis Tolentino	PDP–Laban
Vice Chairpersons	Bong Go	PDP–Laban
Vice Chairpersons	Manny Pacquiao	PDP–Laban
Vice Chairpersons	Lito Lapid	NPC
Members for the Majority	Joel Villanueva	CIBAC
Members for the Majority	Bong Revilla	Lakas
Members for the Majority	Nancy Binay	UNA
Members for the Majority	Cynthia Villar	Nacionalista
Members for the Majority	Panfilo Lacson	Independent
Members for the Minority	Risa Hontiveros	Akbayan
Members for the Minority	Francis Pangilinan	Liberal

Committee secretary: Rachel L. Yuayan
