= Philippine Senate Committee on Games and Amusement =

Standing committee of the Senate of the Philippines

Committee on Games and Amusement
- Senate of the Philippines; 20th Congress

History
- New session started: July 28, 2025

Leadership
- Chair: Erwin Tulfo (Lakas) since July 29, 2025

Structure
- Seats: 11
- Political groups: Majority (7): NPC (2); Akbayan (1); Lakas (1); Liberal (1); Nacionalista (1); Independent (1); Minority (4): PDP (2); PMP (1); Independent (1)

The Philippine Senate Committee on Games and Amusement is a standing committee of the Senate of the Philippines.

This committee, along with the Committee on Sports, was formed after the Committee on Games, Amusement and Sports was split into two on August 1, 2016, pursuant to Senate Resolution No. 3 of the 17th Congress.

== Jurisdiction ==
According to the Rules of the Senate, the committee handles all matters relating to games and amusement, such as, but not limited to, casinos, lotteries, jai-alai and horse-racing.

== Members, 20th Congress ==
Based on the Rules of the Senate, the Senate Committee on Games and Amusement has 11 members.

Position	Member	Party
Chairperson	Erwin Tulfo	Lakas
Vice Chairpersons	Ronald dela Rosa	PDP
Vice Chairpersons	Bong Go	PDP
Deputy Majority Leaders	JV Ejercito	NPC
Deputy Majority Leaders	Risa Hontiveros	Akbayan
Members for the Majority	Lito Lapid	NPC
Members for the Majority	Kiko Pangilinan	Liberal
Members for the Majority	Raffy Tulfo	Independent
Members for the Majority	Mark Villar	Nacionalista
Deputy Minority Leader	Rodante Marcoleta	Independent
Member for the Minority	Jinggoy Estrada	PMP

Ex officio members:

- Senate President pro tempore Panfilo Lacson
- Majority Floor Leader Juan Miguel Zubiri
- Minority Floor Leader Alan Peter Cayetano

Committee secretary: Realyn Cervantes-Garces

== Historical membership rosters ==
=== 19th Congress ===
Position	Member	Party
Chairperson	Mark Villar	Nacionalista
Vice Chairpersons	Bong Go	PDP–Laban
Vice Chairpersons	Raffy Tulfo	Independent
Members for the Majority	JV Ejercito	NPC
Members for the Majority	Ronald dela Rosa	PDP–Laban
Members for the Majority	Lito Lapid	NPC
Members for the Majority	Loren Legarda	NPC
Members for the Majority	Robin Padilla	PDP–Laban
Members for the Majority	Bong Revilla	Lakas
Members for the Majority	Juan Miguel Zubiri	Independent
Member for the Minority	Risa Hontiveros	Akbayan

Committee secretary: Dir. Felipe T. Yadao, Jr.

=== 18th Congress ===
Position	Member	Party
Chairperson	Lito Lapid	NPC
Vice Chairperson	none	
Members for the Majority	Panfilo Lacson	Independent
Members for the Majority	Bong Go	PDP–Laban
Members for the Majority	Manny Pacquiao	PDP–Laban
Members for the Majority	Bong Revilla	Lakas
Members for the Majority	Francis Tolentino	PDP–Laban
Members for the Majority	Imee Marcos	Nacionalista
Members for the Minority	Leila de Lima	Liberal
Members for the Minority	Francis Pangilinan	Liberal

Committee secretary: Felipe T. Yadao, Jr

== See also ==
- List of Philippine Senate committees
