= List of schools in Marikina =

Wikimedia list article

Marikina has a varied educational system with specializations in diverse academic and technical fields and is home to many community schools and colleges, both public and private. It has 2 public tertiary schools, 17 public elementary schools, and 16 public secondary schools.

== Public tertiary education ==
- Marikina Polytechnic College
- Pamantasan ng Lungsod ng Marikina

== Vocational education ==
- Mother Therese Institute of Technology and Assessment Center
- National Technical and Vocational Education and Training (TVET) Trainers Academy
- Philippine Academy for Technical and Professional Skills

== Public secondary education ==
- Barangka National High School
- Concepcion Integrated School (Secondary)
- Fortune High School
- Jesus Dela Peña National High School
- Kalumpang National High School
- Malanday National High School
- Marikina Heights National High School
- Marikina High School
- Marikina Science High School
- Nangka High School
- Parang High School
- San Roque National High School
- SSS Village National High School
- Sta. Elena High School
- Sto. Niño National High School
- Tañong High School

== Public primary education ==
- Barangka Elementary School
- Concepcion Elementary School
- Concepcion Integrated School (Elementary)
- Fortune Elementary School
- H. Bautista Elementary School
- Industrial Valley Elementary School
- Kalumpang Elementary School
- Kapitan Moy Elementary School
- Leodegario Victorino Elementary School
- Malanday Elementary School
- Marikina Elementary School
- Nangka Elementary School
- Parang Elementary School
- San Roque Elementary School
- SSS Village Elementary School
- St. Mary Elementary School
- Sto. Niño Elementary School

== Private schools ==
There are numerous private schools in Marikina that offer different levels of education.

=== Offering tertiary education (or from primary up to tertiary education) ===
- Access Computer College Marikina
- College of Arts and Sciences of Asia and the Pacific
- FEU Roosevelt Marikina
- International Electronics and Technical Institute, Inc. Marikina
- Marist College
- National Christian Life College
- Our Lady of Perpetual Succor College
- STI College Marikina

=== Offering early childhood, primary and/or secondary education ===
- Berean Crosspointe International
- Blessed Hope Christian Academy
- C. A. Santos Learning Center
- Charis School
- Child's Angel Learning Center
- Divine Mercy Child Development of Marikina
- Drawline Wisdom Learning Center
- Excellent Brain School Barangka
- Family Montessori of Marikina
- Good News Community School Inc.
- Holy Trinity School of St. Therese of the Child Jesus
- Infant Jesus Academy
- Ingenium School
- Integrated School for Young Children
- Irvinghall School
- Jehoshua Academy of Marikina
- Jesus Flock Academy Foundation
- King Shepherd Flock Christian Academy
- Links School for Life
- Marikina Catholic School
- Marikina Christian Integration School
- Marikina Greenheights Learning Center
- Midtown Puso Child Development Center
- MJT Young Achievers Learning Center
- Moriah Christian Academy
- Mother Anna Ventura Sacred Heart Child Care Center Foundation
- Mother Goose Playskool Montessori
- Mother of Divine Providence School
- My Kids World Laboratory School
- My Playland Learning Center
- Nativity of Our Lady Parochial School
- Nuestra Señora de Guia Academy of Marikina
- Pathfinder Academy
- Preparatory Education for Early Learners
- PUSO Program Enrichment Center for Early Childhood
- Rainbow Bright School
- Redeemed of Christ School
- San Lorenzo Ruiz de Manila School
- Savant Preparatory Education Center
- Seven S Kiddie School
- Shecaniah Learning Center
- Sisters of Charity of Our Lady Mother of Mercy Day Care and Learning
- Smallville Montesorri
- SMART Eclectic School
- St. John Bosco Academy
- St. Pio Learning Center
- St. Scholastica's Academy
- Sunrays Learning Center
- The Learning House Child Development Center
- The Sophia Child Study Center
- Think de Lumine Academy
- Victory Montessori School
- Victoria School Foundation
- Young Seed Preschool
