= Philippine Senate Committee on Local Government =

Standing committee of the Senate of the Philippines

Committee on Local Government
- Senate of the Philippines; 20th Congress

History
- New session started: July 28, 2025

Leadership
- Chair: Jinggoy Estrada (PMP) since September 15, 2025

Structure
- Seats: 15
- Political groups: Majority (9): NPC (4); Nacionalista (2); Akbayan (1); KANP (1); Independent (1); Minority (6): PDP (3); Nacionalista (1); PMP (1); Independent (1)

The Philippine Senate Committee on Local Government is a standing committee of the Senate of the Philippines.

== Jurisdiction ==
According to the Rules of the Senate, the committee handles all matters relating to local government units in the Philippines, such as autonomous regions, provinces, cities, special metropolitan political subdivisions, municipalities and barangays.

== Members, 20th Congress ==
Based on the Rules of the Senate, the Senate Committee on Local Government has 15 members.

Position	Member	Party
Chairperson	Jinggoy Estrada	PMP
Vice Chairperson	Ronald dela Rosa	PDP
Deputy Majority Leaders	JV Ejercito	NPC
Deputy Majority Leaders	Risa Hontiveros	Akbayan
Members for the Majority	Bam Aquino	KANP
Members for the Majority	Win Gatchalian	NPC
Members for the Majority	Lito Lapid	NPC
Members for the Majority	Loren Legarda	NPC
Members for the Majority	Raffy Tulfo	Independent
Members for the Majority	Camille Villar	Nacionalista
Members for the Majority	Mark Villar	Nacionalista
Deputy Minority Leader	Joel Villanueva	Independent
Members for the Minority	Bong Go	PDP
Members for the Minority	Imee Marcos	Nacionalista
Members for the Minority	Robin Padilla	PDP

Ex officio members:

- Senate President pro tempore Panfilo Lacson
- Majority Floor Leader Juan Miguel Zubiri
- Minority Floor Leader Alan Peter Cayetano

Committee secretary: Jovy Anne V. Querubin-Fernandez

== Historical membership rosters ==
=== 19th Congress ===
Position	Member	Party
Chairperson	JV Ejercito	NPC
Vice Chairperson	Ronald dela Rosa	PDP–Laban
Members for the Majority	Mark Villar	Nacionalista
Members for the Majority	Nancy Binay	UNA
Members for the Majority	Win Gatchalian	NPC
Members for the Majority	Bong Go	PDP–Laban
Members for the Majority	Loren Legarda	NPC
Members for the Majority	Imee Marcos	Nacionalista
Members for the Majority	Robin Padilla	PDP–Laban
Members for the Majority	Bong Revilla	Lakas
Members for the Majority	Raffy Tulfo	Independent
Members for the Majority	Joel Villanueva	Independent
Members for the Majority	Cynthia Villar	Nacionalista
Members for the Majority	Juan Miguel Zubiri	Independent
Member for the Minority	Risa Hontiveros	Akbayan

Committee secretary: Jovy Anne V. Querubin-Fernandez

=== 18th Congress ===
Position	Member	Party
Chairperson	Francis Tolentino	PDP–Laban
Vice Chairperson	Imee Marcos	Nacionalista
Members for the Majority	Ronald dela Rosa	PDP–Laban
Members for the Majority	Bong Go	PDP–Laban
Members for the Majority	Bong Revilla	Lakas
Members for the Majority	Win Gatchalian	NPC
Members for the Majority	Nancy Binay	UNA
Members for the Majority	Cynthia Villar	Nacionalista
Members for the Majority	Panfilo Lacson	Independent
Members for the Majority	Joel Villanueva	CIBAC
Members for the Majority	Koko Pimentel	PDP–Laban
Members for the Minority	Francis Pangilinan	Liberal
Members for the Minority	Risa Hontiveros	Akbayan

Committee secretary: Bernadine B. Mahinay

== See also ==
- List of Philippine Senate committees
