= MSHS =

MSHS may refer to:

- MacGregor State High School, a high school in Brisbane, Queensland, Australia
- Mackay State High School, a high school in Mackay, Queensland, Australia
- Manila Science High School, a high school in Manila, Philippines
- Marikina Science High School, a high school in Marikina, Philippines
- Maris Stella High School, a Catholic school in Singapore
- Marsden State High School, a secondary school in Logan, Queensland, Australia
- Melville Senior High School, a public secondary school in Perth, Western Australia
- Miami Senior High School, a public high school in Miami, Florida, United States
- Mirrabooka Senior High School, a public secondary school in Perth, Western Australia
- Morley Senior High School, a public secondary school in Perth, Western Australia
- Mount Stromlo High School, a high school in Canberra, Australian Capital Territory
- Muntinlupa Science High School, a high school in Muntinlupa, Philippines
- Master of Science in Health Science
- Master of Science in Homeland Security

== See also ==
- List of Michigan State Historic Sites
