= Philippine Senate Committee on Energy =

Standing committee of the Senate of the Philippines

Committee on Energy
- Senate of the Philippines; 20th Congress

History
- New session started: July 28, 2025

Leadership
- Chair: Pia Cayetano (Nacionalista) since July 29, 2025

Structure
- Political groups: Majority (9): NPC (4); Akbayan (1); KANP (1); Liberal (1); Nacionalista (1); Independent (1); Minority (6): PDP (2); Nacionalista (1); PMP (1); Independent (2)

The Philippine Senate Committee on Energy is a standing committee of the Senate of the Philippines.

== Jurisdiction ==
According to the Rules of the Senate, the committee handles all matters relating to:

- The Department of Energy
- Exploration, exploitation, development, extraction, importation, refining, transport, marketing, distribution, conservation, or storage of all forms of energy products and resources such as from fossil fuels like petroleum, coal, natural gas and gas liquids, and nuclear fuel resources
- Geothermal resources and non-conventional, existing and potential forms of energy resources
- Generation, transmission and distribution of electric power
- The National Power Corporation
- The National Transmission Corporation
- The National Grid Corporation of the Philippines

== Members, 20th Congress ==
Based on the Rules of the Senate, the Senate Committee on Energy has 15 members.

Position	Member	Party
Chairperson	Pia Cayetano	Nacionalista
Vice Chairpersons	Win Gatchalian	NPC
Vice Chairpersons	Rodante Marcoleta (Note: Also serving as the deputy minority leader alongside Joel Villanueva (Independent).)	Independent
Deputy Majority Leaders	JV Ejercito	NPC
Deputy Majority Leaders	Risa Hontiveros	Akbayan
Members for the Majority	Bam Aquino	KANP
Members for the Majority	Lito Lapid	NPC
Members for the Majority	Loren Legarda	NPC
Members for the Majority	Kiko Pangilinan	Liberal
Members for the Majority	Raffy Tulfo	Independent
Deputy Minority Leader	Joel Villanueva	Independent
Members for the Minority	Ronald dela Rosa	PDP
Members for the Minority	Jinggoy Estrada	PMP
Members for the Minority	Bong Go	PDP
Members for the Minority	Imee Marcos	Nacionalista

Ex officio members:

- Senate President pro tempore Panfilo Lacson
- Majority Floor Leader Juan Miguel Zubiri
- Minority Floor Leader Alan Peter Cayetano

Committee secretary: Grace Ann Salesa

== Historical membership rosters ==
=== 19th Congress ===
Position	Member	Party
Chairperson	Pia Cayetano	Nacionalista
Vice Chairperson	Win Gatchalian	NPC
Members for the Majority	JV Ejercito	NPC
Members for the Majority	Mark Villar	Nacionalista
Members for the Majority	Nancy Binay	UNA
Members for the Majority	Alan Peter Cayetano	Independent
Members for the Majority	Ronald dela Rosa	PDP–Laban
Members for the Majority	Bong Go	PDP–Laban
Members for the Majority	Lito Lapid	NPC
Members for the Majority	Grace Poe	Independent
Members for the Majority	Raffy Tulfo	Independent
Members for the Majority	Juan Miguel Zubiri	Independent
Member for the Minority	Risa Hontiveros	Akbayan

Committee secretary: Grace Ann C. Salesa

=== 18th Congress ===
Position	Member	Party
Chairperson	Win Gatchalian	NPC
Vice Chairperson	none	
Members for the Majority	Nancy Binay	UNA
Members for the Majority	Sonny Angara	LDP
Members for the Majority	Ronald dela Rosa	PDP–Laban
Members for the Majority	Richard Gordon	Independent
Members for the Majority	Panfilo Lacson	Independent
Members for the Majority	Lito Lapid	NPC
Members for the Majority	Imee Marcos	Nacionalista
Members for the Majority	Manny Pacquiao	PDP–Laban
Members for the Majority	Koko Pimentel	PDP–Laban
Members for the Majority	Grace Poe	Independent
Members for the Majority	Francis Tolentino	PDP–Laban
Members for the Minority	Leila de Lima	Liberal
Members for the Minority	Risa Hontiveros	Akbayan
Members for the Minority	Francis Pangilinan	Liberal

Committee secretary: Grace Ann C. Salesa

== See also ==
- List of Philippine Senate committees
