= Rodolfo B. Valentino =

Filipino mayor

Rodolfo Valentino

Mayor of Marikina
- In office February 2, 1988 – June 30, 1992
- Vice Mayor: Felizardo C. Bulaong
- Preceded by: Guillermo S. Flores (acting)
- Succeeded by: Bayani Fernando
- In office April 1986 – December 1, 1987
- Vice Mayor: Alfonso D. Salvador
- Preceded by: Teofisto R. Santos
- Succeeded by: Guillermo S. Flores (acting)

Member of the Marikina Municipal Council
- In office December 30, 1971 – 1976

Personal details
- Born: Rodolfo Bautista Valentino; June 1932
- Died: March 2020 (aged 87)
- Resting place: Loyola Memorial Park, Marikina, Philippines
- Party: LDP
- Occupation: Dentist

Rodolfo Bautista Valentino Sr. (June 1932 – March 2020) was a Filipino dentist and politician who served as the mayor of Marikina from 1988 to 1992. He previously held the role as an officer-in-charge, following the People Power Revolution in February 1986, and also served as a municipal councilor of Marikina from December 1971 until the suspension of legislative councils in 1976. Valentino's mayoralty was characterized by efforts to revitalize the local shoe industry. He lost re-election in 1992 to Bayani Fernando.

== Life and career ==
Valentino was born to a shoemaking family in Marikina. He is a dentist by profession. Following the 1986 People Power Revolution that saw the ouster of President Ferdinand Marcos from office, his successor, President Corazon Aquino, appointed Valentino as an officer-in-charge of Marikina. He would be elected in his own right in early 1988, defeating six other candidates such as Benjamin J. Rivera, who placed second, and Bayani Fernando, a mechanical engineer and businessman who placed fourth. However, Valentino later lost re-election in 1992 to Fernando.

In this capacity, Valentino sought to maintain the Marikina shoe industry. During his tenure, he travelled to various countries, including China, Germany, the Soviet Union, and Vietnam. In Düsseldorf, he was able to get a substantial order for ladies' shoes, which was filled by Figlia Shoes, a local consortium led by Joey Enriquez. He went with Trade Secretary Jose Concepcion on a trade mission to Moscow in 1989. On his second trip to Moscow the following year, he was offered a contract to supply one million pairs, which Vietnam, a fellow socialist country, could not fulfill. But the Russians could pay only in rubles. In his trip to Wuhan in China, Valentino explored the possibility of using rubles for raw materials.

Valentino took the risks of dealing with a socialist country. He had to deal not with businessmen but with government functionaries. When the Soviet Union collapsed in 1991, it was clear on his third visit to Moscow that his agreement with the communist regime could not be implemented.

Following his death, Valentino was laid to rest at the Loyola Memorial Park.

Preceded by Teofisto Santos	Mayor of Marikina; 1988–1992	Succeeded by Bayani Fernando
