= Thomas Orbos =

Filipino government official

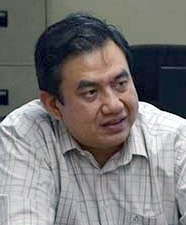
- Orbos in 2016

Chairman of the Metropolitan Manila Development Authority
- Officer in Charge
- In office August 22, 2016 – May 21, 2017
- President: Rodrigo Duterte
- Preceded by: Emerson Carlos
- Succeeded by: Danilo Lim

General Manager of the Metropolitan Manila Development Authority
- In office August 22, 2016 – February 19, 2018
- President: Rodrigo Duterte
- Preceded by: Corazon Jimenez
- Succeeded by: Jose Arturo Garcia

Assistant General Manager for Planning of the Metropolitan Manila Development Authority
- In office June 9, 2014 – August 19, 2016
- President: Benigno S. Aquino III
- Preceded by: Tina Velasco
- Succeeded by: Maria Josefina Faulan

Personal details
- Party: PDP–Laban
- Relations: Oscar Orbos (brother)
- Education: Massachusetts Institute of Technology

Thomas "Tim" Muñoz Orbos is a Filipino businessman, government administrator and politician who was General Manager of the Metropolitan Manila Development Authority (MMDA) and Undersecretary for Road Transport and Infrastructure of the Department of Transportation under the Duterte administration. He also served as MMDA's acting chairman following the resignation of Emerson Carlos on August 19, 2016. Orbos previously held the position of MMDA Assistant General Manager for Planning under then President Benigno Aquino III.

Orbos hails from the province of Pangasinan and is the brother of former Executive Secretary and Congressman Oscar Orbos and noted Catholic priest Jerry Orbos. He has also previously worked as Undersecretary for the Office of the President and owned several businesses in the past including the Pangasinan Presidents (later renamed Pangasinan Waves) franchise team in the now-defunct Metropolitan Basketball Association. He is also an alumnus from Massachusetts Institute Of Technology, Sloan School of Management.

In 2019, Orbos ran for the congressional seat representing the 1st District of Pangasinan, a post formerly headed by his brother. He ran under the PDP–Laban party of President Duterte. He lost to his rival, Arnold "Noli" Celeste, by about 18,000 votes.

Political offices
Preceded by Emerson Carlos; Acting	Chairman of the Metropolitan Manila Development Authority; 2016–2017	Succeeded by Danilo Lim
