= Philippine Senate Committee on Sports =

Standing committee of the Senate of the Philippines

Committee on Sports
- Senate of the Philippines; 20th Congress

History
- New session started: July 28, 2025

Leadership
- Chair: Bong Go (PDP) since July 29, 2025

Structure
- Seats: 11
- Political groups: Majority (7): NPC (4); Nacionalista (2); Akbayan (1); Minority (4): PDP (2); PMP (1); Independent (1)

The Philippine Senate Committee on Sports is a standing committee of the Senate of the Philippines.

This committee, along with the Committee on Games and Amusement, was formed after the Committee on Games, Amusement and Sports was split into two on August 1, 2016, pursuant to Senate Resolution No. 3 of the 17th Congress.

== Jurisdiction ==
According to the Rules of the Senate, the committee handles all matters relating to the promotion of physical fitness, and professional and amateur sports development in the Philippines.

== Members, 20th Congress ==
Based on the Rules of the Senate, the Senate Committee on Sports has 11 members.

Position	Member	Party
Chairperson	Bong Go	PDP
Vice Chairperson	Joel Villanueva (Note: Also serving as the deputy minority leader.)	Independent
Deputy Majority Leaders	JV Ejercito	NPC
Deputy Majority Leaders	Risa Hontiveros	Akbayan
Members for the Majority	Pia Cayetano	Nacionalista
Members for the Majority	Win Gatchalian	NPC
Members for the Majority	Lito Lapid	NPC
Members for the Majority	Loren Legarda	NPC
Members for the Majority	Mark Villar	Nacionalista
Members for the Minority	Jinggoy Estrada	PMP
Members for the Minority	Robin Padilla	PDP

Ex officio members:

- Senate President pro tempore Tito Sotto
- Majority Floor Leader Juan Miguel Zubiri
- Minority Floor Leader Alan Peter Cayetano

Committee secretary: Jinggle C. Allam

== Historical membership rosters ==
=== 18th Congress ===
Position	Member	Party
Chairperson	Bong Go	PDP–Laban
Vice Chairperson	Manny Pacquiao	PDP–Laban
Members for the Majority	Pia Cayetano	Nacionalista
Members for the Majority	Ronald dela Rosa	PDP–Laban
Members for the Majority	Francis Tolentino	PDP–Laban
Members for the Majority	Joel Villanueva	CIBAC
Members for the Majority	Bong Revilla	Lakas
Members for the Minority	Leila de Lima	Liberal
Members for the Minority	Risa Hontiveros	Akbayan

Committee secretary: Horace R. Cruda

== See also ==
- List of Philippine Senate committees
