= Philippine Senate Committee on Migrant Workers =

Standing committee of the Senate of the Philippines

Committee on Migrant Workers
- Senate of the Philippines; 20th Congress

History
- New session started: July 28, 2025

Leadership
- Chair: Raffy Tulfo (Independent) since July 29, 2025

Structure
- Seats: 15
- Political groups: Majority (9): NPC (4); Akbayan (1); KANP (1); Lakas (1); Nacionalista (1); Independent (1); Minority (6): PDP (3); Nacionalista (1); PMP (1); Independent (1)

The Philippine Senate Committee on Migrant Workers is a standing committee of the Senate of the Philippines.

== Jurisdiction ==
According to the Rules of the Senate, the committee handles all matters relating to:

- The rights, safety, welfare, well-being, interest, and protection of overseas Filipino workers (OFWs) and seafarers and their families

== Members, 20th Congress ==
Based on the Rules of the Senate, the Senate Committee on Migrant Workers has 15 members.

Position	Member	Party
Chairperson	Raffy Tulfo	Independent
Vice Chairperson	Bong Go	PDP
Deputy Majority Leaders	JV Ejercito	NPC
Deputy Majority Leaders	Risa Hontiveros	Akbayan
Members for the Majority	Bam Aquino	KANP
Members for the Majority	Win Gatchalian	NPC
Members for the Majority	Lito Lapid	NPC
Members for the Majority	Loren Legarda	NPC
Members for the Majority	Erwin Tulfo	Lakas
Members for the Majority	Mark Villar	Nacionalista
Deputy Minority Leader	Joel Villanueva	Independent
Members for the Minority	Ronald dela Rosa	PDP
Members for the Minority	Jinggoy Estrada	PMP
Members for the Minority	Imee Marcos	Nacionalista
Members for the Minority	Robin Padilla	PDP

Ex officio members:

- Senate President pro tempore Panfilo Lacson
- Majority Floor Leader Juan Miguel Zubiri
- Minority Floor Leader Alan Peter Cayetano

Committee secretary: Ambrosio M. Manaligod Jr.

== Historical membership rosters ==
=== 19th Congress ===
Position	Member	Party
Chairperson	Raffy Tulfo	Independent
Vice Chairperson	Bong Go	PDP–Laban
Members for the Majority	JV Ejercito	NPC
Members for the Majority	Mark Villar	Nacionalista
Members for the Majority	Nancy Binay	UNA
Members for the Majority	Alan Peter Cayetano	Independent
Members for the Majority	Pia Cayetano	Nacionalista
Members for the Majority	Ronald dela Rosa	PDP–Laban
Members for the Majority	Lito Lapid	NPC
Members for the Majority	Loren Legarda	NPC
Members for the Majority	Imee Marcos	Nacionalista
Members for the Majority	Robin Padilla	PDP–Laban
Members for the Majority	Bong Revilla	Lakas
Members for the Majority	Juan Miguel Zubiri	Independent
Member for the Minority	Risa Hontiveros	Akbayan

Committee secretary: Jingle Concon-Allam

== See also ==
- List of Philippine Senate committees
