= Philippine Senate Committee on Public Services =

Standing committee of the Senate of the Philippines

Committee on Public Services
- Senate of the Philippines; 20th Congress

History
- New session started: July 28, 2025

Leadership
- Chair: Raffy Tulfo (Independent) since July 29, 2025

Structure
- Seats: 13
- Political groups: Majority (8): NPC (3); Akbayan (1); KANP (1); Liberal (1); Nacionalista (1); Independent (1); Minority (5): PDP (2); PMP (1); Independent (2)

The Philippine Senate Committee on Public Services is a standing committee of the Senate of the Philippines.

== Jurisdiction ==
According to the Rules of the Senate, the committee handles all matters relating to:

- Public services and utilities
- The Department of Information and Communications Technology
  - National Telecommunications Commission
- The Department of Transportation
- Grant or amendment of legislative franchises

== Members, 20th Congress ==
Based on the Rules of the Senate, the Senate Committee on Public Services has 13 members.

Position	Member	Party
Chairperson	Raffy Tulfo	Independent
Vice Chairpersons	JV Ejercito (Note: Also serving as the deputy majority leader alongside Risa Hontiveros (Akbayan).)	NPC
Vice Chairpersons	Win Gatchalian	NPC
Deputy Majority Leader	Risa Hontiveros	Akbayan
Members for the Majority	Bam Aquino	KANP
Members for the Majority	Loren Legarda	NPC
Members for the Majority	Kiko Pangilinan	Liberal
Members for the Majority	Mark Villar	Nacionalista
Deputy Minority Leaders	Rodante Marcoleta	Independent
Deputy Minority Leaders	Joel Villanueva	Independent
Members for the Minority	Ronald dela Rosa	PDP
Members for the Minority	Bong Go	PDP
Members for the Minority	Jinggoy Estrada	PMP

Ex officio members:

- Senate President pro tempore Panfilo Lacson
- Majority Floor Leader Juan Miguel Zubiri
- Minority Floor Leader Alan Peter Cayetano

Committee secretary: David T. Alegre III

== Historical membership rosters ==
=== 18th Congress ===
Position	Member	Party
Chairperson	Grace Poe	Independent
Vice Chairpersons	Panfilo Lacson	Independent
Vice Chairpersons	Bong Revilla	Lakas
Vice Chairpersons	Manny Pacquiao	PDP–Laban
Vice Chairpersons	Win Gatchalian	NPC
Members for the Majority	Bong Go	PDP–Laban
Members for the Majority	Nancy Binay	UNA
Members for the Majority	Francis Tolentino	PDP–Laban
Members for the Majority	Joel Villanueva	CIBAC
Members for the Majority	Richard Gordon	Independent
Members for the Majority	Lito Lapid	NPC
Members for the Minority	Risa Hontiveros	Akbayan
Members for the Minority	Francis Pangilinan	Liberal

Committee secretary: Harold Ian V. Bartolome

== See also ==
- List of Philippine Senate committees
