= Ligaya Fernando-Amilbangsa =

Filipino dancer and academic

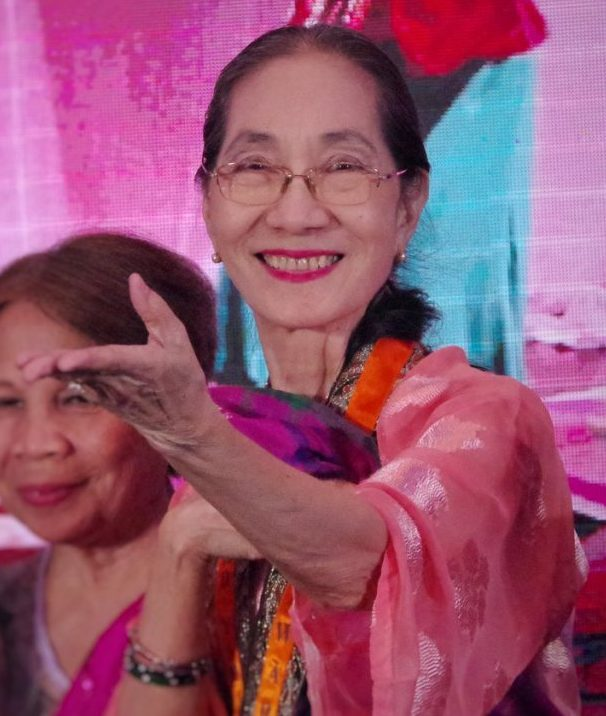
- Fernando-Amilbangsa in 2019
- Born: Ligaya Fernando-Amilbangsa; October 9, 1942 (age 83); San Juan, City of Greater Manila, Philippines
- Education: Far Eastern University
- Occupations: Folk dancer; academic
- Spouse: Datu Punjungan Amilbangsa (m. 1964; died 1987)
- Children: 2 (inc. Grace)
- Parents: Gil E. Fernando (father); Remedios Flores (mother)
- Relatives: Bayani Fernando (brother)
- Career
- Current group: Tambuli Cultural Troupe; Integrated Performing Arts Guild; AlunAlun Dance Circle
- Dances: Pangalay

Ligaya Fernando-Amilbangsa (born October 9, 1942) is a Filipino dancer and academic known for her studies and promotion of the pangalay dance tradition of the southern Philippines and is a recipient of the Ramon Magsaysay Award.

She was nominated by former senator Miriam Defensor Santiago to be included in the list of National Living Treasures or Gawad Manlilika ng Bayan (GAMABA), the highest honor bestowed on individuals who have contributed immensely on indigenous culture and arts.

== Early life ==
Fernando-Amilbangsa was born in 1942. She was born to a prominent Catholic political family in Marikina, Metro Manila, Philippines with her father being Gil Estanislao Fernando Sr. who served as Mayor of Marikina for several years and her younger brother Bayani Fernando who would also become Mayor of Marikina and head of the Metropolitan Manila Development Authority (MMDA). Her mother, Remedios Flores Fernando, was a pianist. She was part of a folk dance troupe at her school and took some lesson in ballet at age 8 or 9. She also enjoyed dancing the boogie and rock 'n roll.

She entered the Far Eastern University as an English major in 1959 where she also met her future husband, Datu Punjungan Amilbangsa.

== Works ==
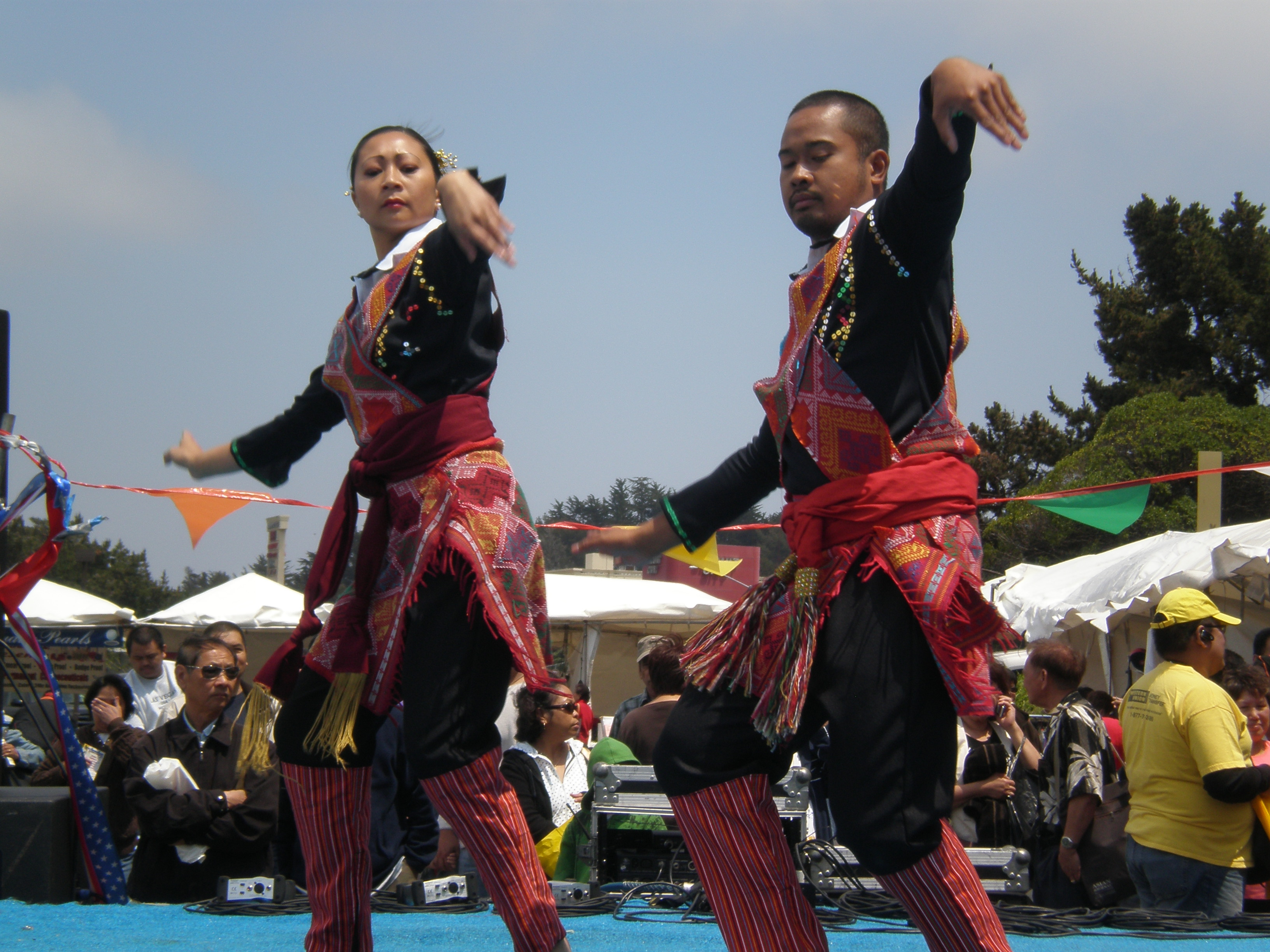
Two people performing pangalay, Fernando-Amilbangsa is known for her works on the form of dance.

Fernando-Amilbangsa visited in Sulu in 1969 where she saw a performance pangalay at a wedding in Jolo island. Pangalay (lit. "gift offering" or "temple of dance" in Sanskrit), a form of pre-Islamic dance practiced by the Badjao, Jama Mapun, Tausūg and Samal people of Sulu and Tawi-Tawi. She described Pangalay as "pure dancing." She stayed in Jolo for four years.

For three the next three decades since her visit in Sulu, she studied the Muslim culture of the Southern part of the Philippines, particularly in the Sulu archipelago. She worked as an artist, cultural researcher, educator, and advocate of the locale's indigenous arts.

Among her most significant involvements, is her research, conservation, practice and promotion of pangalay which is traditionally performed in festive events such as weddings. It is characterized by its slow, intricate and hypnotic movements.

In 1973 she moved to Bongao, Tawi-Tawi where she taught at the Mindanao State University – Tawi-Tawi College of Technology and Oceanography. She established the Tambuli Cultural Troupe composed of students of the university where she taught. She taught pangalay to members of the troupe. In 1978, she established the Integrated Performing Arts Guild in Iligan. In 1983 she published a book, Pangalay: Traditional Dances and Related Folk Artistic Expressions, with written dance instructions on pangalay. This book won the 1983 Best Art Book from the Manila Critics Circle. She moved back to Marikina in 1987 following the death of her husband.

She established the AlunAlun Dance Circle (ADC) in Atipolo in 1999. Her own house served as a dance studio where pangalay and other traditional dances were taught and performed. The ADC has performed and organized workshops for at least a hundred times. The Tambuli Cultural Troup also have performed with the ADC.

Through her works, she has gained local and international recognition, including UNESCO and the International Dance Competition in Seoul in 1994, where her pangalay choreography won the silver award under the folk dance category. Later, she was awarded the Ramon Magsaysay Award on August 31, 2015.

== Personal life ==
Fernando-Amilbangsa was married to Datu Punjungan Amilbangsa, the young brother of Sultan Mohammad Amirul Ombra Amilbangsa, the last reigning monarch of the Sulu Sultanate. She married Datu Paunjungan in 1964, who was also her schoolmate at FEU. Despite growing up in a prominent Catholic family, Fernando-Amilbangsa lived in the Muslim South for three decades, specifically the Sulu Archipelago, along with her husband until he died in 1987. They had two children, a daughter and a son.

Their daughter, Dayang-dayang Grace Amilbangsa, became a theatre actress and filmmaker in the 1980s.
