= Philippine Senate Committee on Labor, Employment and Human Resources Development =

Standing committee of the Senate of the Philippines

Committee on Labor, Employment and Human Resources Development
- Senate of the Philippines; 20th Congress

History
- New session started: July 28, 2025

Leadership
- Chair: Chiz Escudero (Nationalist People's Coalition) since May 25, 2026

Structure
- Seats: 15
- Political groups: Majority (9): NPC (3); Nacionalista (2); Akbayan (1); KANP (1); Lakas (1); Independent (1); Minority (6): PDP (2); Nacionalista (1); PMP (1); Independent (2)

The Philippine Senate Committee on Labor, Employment and Human Resources Development is a standing committee of the Senate of the Philippines.

== Jurisdiction ==
According to the Rules of the Senate, the committee handles all matters relating to:

- Labor, employment and human resource development
- Maintenance of industrial peace
- Promotion of employer-employee cooperation
- Labor education, standards and statistics
- Organization of the labor market including recruitment, training and placement of workers and exports of human resources
- Foreign workers in the Philippines
- Promotion and development of workers' organizations
- Promotion and development of employment-intensive technology

== Members, 20th Congress ==
Based on the Rules of the Senate, the Senate Committee on Labor, Employment and Human Resources Development has 15 members.

Position	Member	Party
Chairperson	Chiz Escudero	NPC
Vice Chairperson	Raffy Tulfo	Independent
Members for the Majority	Jinggoy Estrada	PMP
Members for the Majority	Bong Go	PDP
Members for the Majority	Robin Padilla	PDP
Members for the Majority	Camille Villar	Nacionalista
Members for the Majority	Mark Villar	Nacionalista
Members for the Minority	Bam Aquino	KANP
Members for the Minority	JV Ejercito	NPC
Members for the Minority	Win Gatchalian	NPC
Members for the Minority	Risa Hontiveros	Akbayan
Members for the Minority	Lito Lapid	NPC
Members for the Minority	Erwin Tulfo	Lakas

Ex officio members:

- Senate President pro tempore Loren Legarda
- Acting Majority Floor Leader Joel Villanueva
- Minority Floor Leader Tito Sotto

Committee secretary: Emarie Josephine B. Del Rosario

== Historical membership rosters ==
=== 19th Congress ===
Position	Member	Party
Chairperson	Joel Villanueva	Independent
Vice Chairperson	Raffy Tulfo	Independent
Members for the Majority	JV Ejercito	NPC
Members for the Majority	Mark Villar	Nacionalista
Members for the Majority	Nancy Binay	UNA
Members for the Majority	Ronald dela Rosa	PDP–Laban
Members for the Majority	Win Gatchalian	NPC
Members for the Majority	Bong Go	PDP–Laban
Members for the Majority	Lito Lapid	NPC
Members for the Majority	Loren Legarda	NPC
Members for the Majority	Grace Poe	Independent
Members for the Majority	Bong Revilla	Lakas
Members for the Majority	Cynthia Villar	Nacionalista
Members for the Majority	Juan Miguel Zubiri	Independent
Member for the Minority	Risa Hontiveros	Akbayan

Committee secretary: Ambrosio M. Manaligod, Jr.

=== 18th Congress ===
Position	Member	Party
Chairperson	Joel Villanueva	CIBAC
Vice Chairperson	Nancy Binay	UNA
Members for the Majority	Bong Go	PDP–Laban
Members for the Majority	Win Gatchalian	NPC
Members for the Majority	Sonny Angara	LDP
Members for the Majority	Bong Revilla	Lakas
Members for the Majority	Francis Tolentino	PDP–Laban
Members for the Majority	Manny Pacquiao	PDP–Laban
Members for the Majority	Ronald dela Rosa	PDP–Laban
Members for the Majority	Panfilo Lacson	Independent
Members for the Majority	Koko Pimentel	PDP–Laban
Members for the Minority	Risa Hontiveros	Akbayan
Members for the Minority	Francis Pangilinan	Liberal

Committee secretary: Ambrosio M. Manaligod Jr.

== See also ==
- List of Philippine Senate committees
