= Philippine Maritime Zones Act =

2024 Philippine law

Congress of the Philippines
- Long title: An Act Declaring the Maritime Zone Under the Jurisdiction of the Republic of the Philippines
- Citation: Republic Act No. 12064
- Territorial extent: Philippines
- Enacted by: House of Representatives of the Philippines
- Enacted by: Senate of the Philippines
- Signed by: President Bongbong Marcos
- Signed: November 7, 2024
- Effective: November 28, 2024
- Status: In force

The Philippine Maritime Zones Act, officially designated as Republic Act No. 12064, is a bill passed by the 19th Congress of the Philippines and signed by President Bongbong Marcos on November 7, 2024. It defines the Philippines' internal waters, archipelagic waters, territorial sea, contiguous zone, exclusive economic zone, and continental shelf in line with the 1982 Law of the Sea Convention (UNCLOS) and the 2016 Arbitral Tribunal ruling.

== Overview ==
In May 2024, the Senate of the Philippines established the Special Committee on Philippine Maritime and Admiralty Zones, appointing Senator Francis Tolentino as its chair. This followed the unanimous approval of House Bill No. 7819 by the House of Representatives of the Philippines, which defined the maritime zones under Philippine jurisdiction. The bill, primarily authored and sponsored by Senator Francis Tolentino, sought to define and assert the Philippines' rights and entitlements over its maritime zones as per the 2016 arbitral ruling.

== China's reactions ==
On July 1, 2025, China imposed sanctions on former Philippine Senator Francis Tolentino, prohibiting his entry into mainland China, Hong Kong, and Macau. The sanctions were linked to his positions on the South China Sea dispute, with Beijing citing his “egregious conduct” and opposition to Chinese interests. The sanctions were announced a day after the conclusion of his term in the Senate, making him the first Filipino political figure to be subjected to such measures by China. In response, Tolentino characterized the sanctions as a “badge of honour” and reiterated his support for Philippine national sovereignty. He stated that he has fought—and will continue to fight—for what rightfully belongs to the nation. He expressed his strong support for the Philippine Navy, the Philippine Coast Guard, and the brave fishermen who rely on those waters for their livelihood.
