= Bayani Fernando =

Filipino politician (1946–2023)

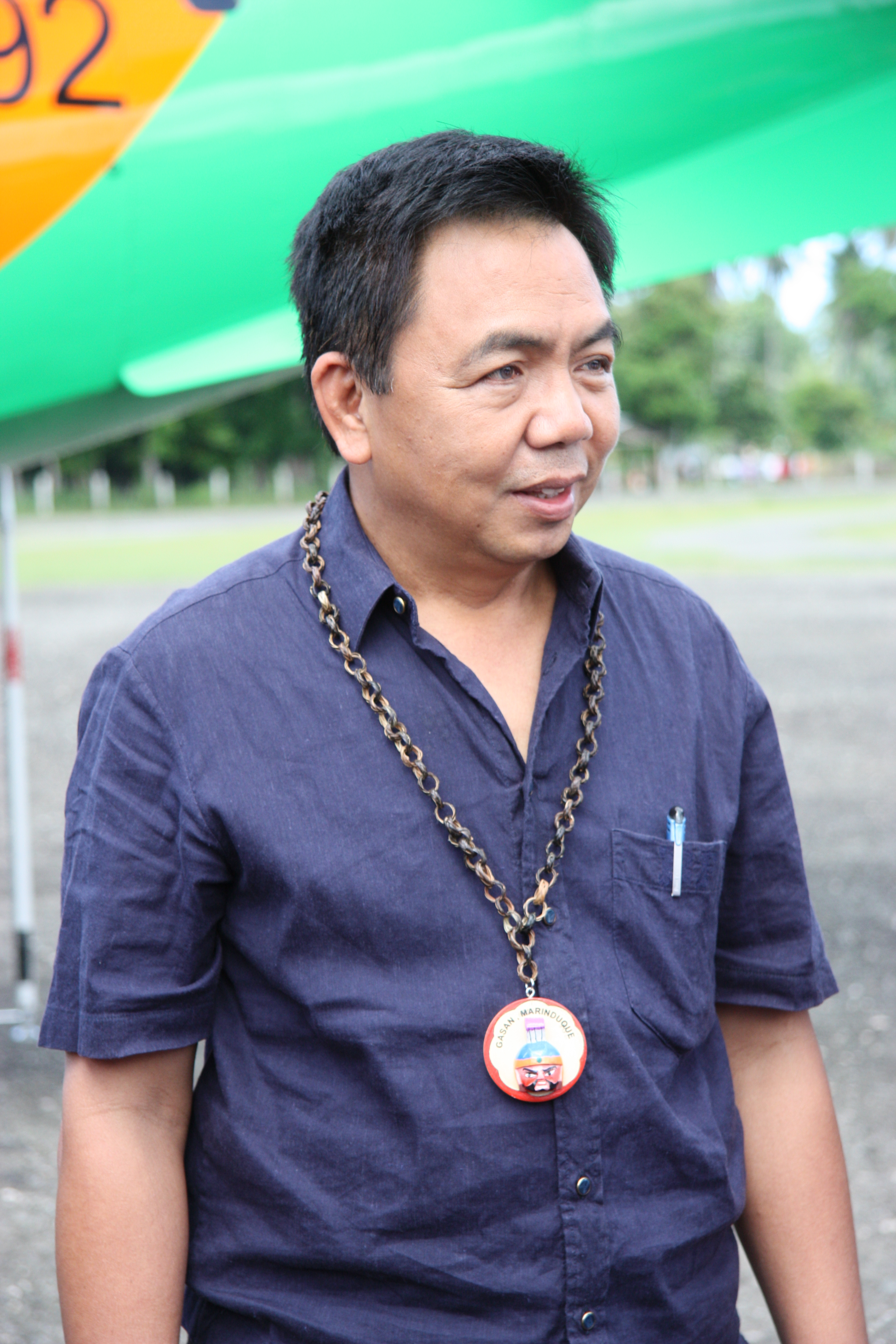
- Fernando in 2009

Member of the Philippine House of Representatives from Marikina's 1st district
- In office June 30, 2016 – June 30, 2022
- Preceded by: Marcelino Teodoro
- Succeeded by: Maan Teodoro

Chairman of the Metropolitan Manila Development Authority
- In office June 5, 2002 – November 25, 2009
- President: Gloria Macapagal Arroyo
- Preceded by: Benjamin Abalos
- Succeeded by: Oscar Inocentes

Secretary of Public Works and Highways
- In office January 15, 2003 – April 15, 2003
- President: Gloria Macapagal Arroyo
- Preceded by: Simeon Datumanong
- Succeeded by: Florante Soriquez

Vice Chairman of the Metropolitan Manila Development Authority
- In office September 29, 1994 – 1995
- President: Fidel V. Ramos
- Chairman: Prospero Oreta
- Preceded by: Prospero Oreta

Mayor of Marikina
- In office June 30, 1992 – June 30, 2001
- Vice Mayor: Del de Guzman
- Preceded by: Rodolfo B. Valentino
- Succeeded by: Marides Fernando

Personal details
- Born: Bayani Flores Fernando; July 25, 1946 San Juan, Rizal, Philippines
- Died: September 22, 2023 (aged 77) Quezon City, Philippines
- Resting place: Loyola Memorial Park, Marikina, Philippines
- Party: NPC (2015–2016; c. 2018–2023)
- Other political affiliations: PDP–Laban (2016–c. 2018); Bagumbayan–VNP (2009–2015); Lakas (1992–2009)
- Spouse: Marides Carlos
- Relations: Ligaya Fernando-Amilbangsa (sister)
- Children: Tala Fernando
- Parents: Gil Fernando (father); Remedios Flores Fernando (mother)
- Education: Mapúa Institute of Technology (BS)
- Occupation: Politician
- Profession: Mechanical Engineer
- Website: bayanifernando.life

Bayani Flores Fernando (Tagalog: [bɐˈjɐnɪ ˈflɔrɛs fɛɾˈnɐndɔ]; July 25, 1946 – September 22, 2023) was a Filipino politician, businessman, and mechanical engineer. He served as the mayor of Marikina from 1992 to 2001. During the administration of President Gloria Macapagal Arroyo, he served as Chairman of the Metropolitan Manila Development Authority (MMDA) from 2002 to 2009 and Secretary of Public Works and Highways from January to April 2003. He was a candidate for vice president of the Philippines in the 2010 elections as the running mate of Dick Gordon. He later served as the representative for Marikina's 1st district from 2016 to 2022.

Born four months before his father Gil Fernando was appointed mayor of Marikina, Fernando's childhood was spent close to his father whilst he worked in local government. After graduating from Mapúa Institute of Technology in 1967, Fernando soon established a construction company within his backyard that would later be named BF Corporation. His company served as the main contractor for infrastructure projects in the 1990s such as Rufino Pacific Tower, Edsa Shangri-La, Manila and PBCom Tower.

Though he ran unsuccessfully for mayor in 1988, Fernando won in the 1992 mayoral election against incumbent mayor Rodolfo Valentino. During his mayorship, Marikina was noted to have markedly improved its infrastructure and cleanliness compared to the preceding decade, with him renewing government efforts to clean the Marikina River, improve emergency services, remove obstructions to public sidewalks and move informal settlers to resettlement sites within the town itself. Due to Fernando's disciplinarian approach to governance, he received regular opposition from Marikina congressman Romeo Candazo, a lawyer and former student activist, throughout his tenure. Despite their contentious relationship, Fernando and Candazo briefly worked together in the conversion of Marikina into a city in 1996. In the years since his mayoralty ended in 2001, Fernando's leadership in Marikina has been described as "transformative" for the city.

== Early life and education ==
Bayani Flores Fernando was born on July 25, 1946, in San Juan del Monte, Rizal, (now San Juan, Metro Manila) to lawyer and politician Gil E. Fernando (1905–2000), founder of the Marikina chapter of the Liberal Party, and Remedios Flores; his birth came just three weeks after Philippine independence and four months prior to Gil's appointment as mayor of Marikina. His family was noted to be fond of the arts, with his father being an orator and avid reader, his mother a pianist, and his elder sister Ligaya a dancer.

Fernando finished his secondary education at the Marikina School of Arts and Trades (now Marikina Science High School). He earned his bachelor's degree in mechanical engineering at the Mapúa Institute of Technology.

== Business career ==
After graduating, Fernando was employed for a total of six months under two companies before establishing his own construction company in the backyard of his Marikina home called BF Metal Benders in 1968 from a loan of ₱6,000. In 1973, Fernando changed its name to BF Metal Engineering, and by 1976, his company became a general contractor. In 1977 the company was given the contract for the fencing of the Central Bank of the Philippines' Security Printing Plant, Mint and Gold Refinery Complex (now simply Security Plant Complex) in Quezon City, at the time the largest fencing project in the country.

In July 1978, BF Metal Engineering was incorporated as BF Metal Corporation. By 1985, Fernando changed its name to simply BF Corporation to indicate its diversified engineering services and placed it under the BF Group of Companies, which served as an umbrella company that includes BF Construction Company and BF Metal Works. His company became involved in the construction of structures for the SM Mall of Asia Arena, SM City Marikina, SM City Sucat, Robinsons Galleria, Robinsons Place Manila, Shangri-La Plaza, Edsa Shangri-La, Manila, and buildings in Makati's business district such as Rufino Pacific Tower and the PBCom Tower, both of which were the tallest buildings in the Philippines at the time of their respective construction.

Long after leaving MMDA, his construction company won a Public–private partnership (PPP) bid that will build classrooms and school buildings for the Department of Education.

His company was again involved in a government project, the Common Station for lines Line 1, Line 3, Line 7, and Line 9 (Metro Manila Subway), supplying steel foundations for the structure. The same company would also supply steel that would become the foundation for large span girders in the NLEX Segment 10.1 Harbor Link section.

Since his death however, construction in the Common Station was intermittent and ultimately in a standstill, prompting DOTr to terminate their contract with BF Corporation.

== Mayor of Marikina (1992–2001) ==
Fernando first ran for mayor of the municipality of Marikina in 1988, finishing in fourth place among seven candidates. In 1992, he was elected mayor of Marikina, defeating reelectionist mayor Rodolfo Valentino, Jose Buenconsejo and two other candidates.

His administration as mayor transformed the former municipality into one of the best-managed cities and a paradigm of responsive and effective governance. His term saw the transformation of Marikina from a fourth class municipality to a model Philippine city accorded with 55 citations and distinctions. He was re-elected mayor twice, serving until 2001. He was succeeded by his wife, Marides Fernando.

== Arroyo administration (2002–2009) ==
=== MMDA chairman (2002–2009) ===
In 2002, Fernando was appointed Chairman of the Metropolitan Manila Development Authority by President Gloria Macapagal Arroyo, directing him to duplicate his transformation work in Marikina, but for the entire Metro Manila. He gained polarized public reactions to his strict style of governance.

Fernando briefly served as Secretary of the Department of Public Works and Highways (DPWH) from January 15, 2003, until April 15, 2003.

For his work as chairman, he was conferred the Doctor of Humanities, Honoris Causa, Ateneo de Cagayan, The Outstanding Filipino (TOFIL) Award for Government Service, the H.R Reyes Academic Medallion of Honor, Central Colleges of the Philippines and Doctor of the Public Administration, Honoris Causa by the Polytechnic University of the Philippines.

Fernando is notable for introducing U-Turn slots, greatly increasing the amount of pedestrian overpasses at road intersections (called footbridges), pioneering broadcasting of the MMDA, sidewalk clearing operations, and revitalizing the assets and fleets of the government agency. Although some of his policies and structures were met with resistance and complaints, many of these can be still seen today. Subsequent MMDA chairmen continued many of BF's contributions, particularly the construction of footbridges.

Fernando, along with former senator Joey Lina and Department of Environment and Natural Resources secretary Angelo Reyes, performed as a singing trio called the Three Tenors. Their concerts, seven of which were sold out, aimed to raise funds for their advocacies.

=== 2010 vice presidential campaign ===
On January 4, 2008, Fernando announced that he would be running for the presidency in the 2010 elections. Fernando hinted that he had gathered the funds and logistics required for a nationwide campaign and was intent on running for the presidency with or without the support of his party, Lakas-CMD. But on September 16, 2009, when Lakas-CMD chose Gilberto Teodoro to represent their party for the presidency, Fernando reiterated "he is keeping his options open and may possibly run as an independent candidate or bolt out of the party."

Fernando announced his intention to run for President of the Philippines in the 2010 general elections, but after talks with Richard Gordon, he agreed to run instead as Vice-President under Gordon's newly established party, Bagumbayan. Fernando lost in the 2010 elections, placing fourth in the polls, losing to Makati mayor Jejomar Binay.

== Return to private life (2010–2016) ==
Nothing was heard from him after the elections; however, he made an appearance again with then MMDA Chairman Francis Tolentino, in the issue of informal settlers and the perennial flooding crisis, defending Tolentino in the flood control issues. On July 25, 2012, with a telephone Interview with him made by his former running mate in a radio program, the former had been focusing on his construction and metal fabrication business at BF Corporation.

== House of Representatives of the Philippines (2016–2022) ==
=== 2016 congressional campaign ===
After First District representative Marcelino Teodoro was term-limited, Fernando marked his political comeback by running for representative in the 2016 elections. He defeated Councilor Samuel Ferriol and TV lawyer Jopet Sison in the race, garnering 54.21% of the vote.

=== ABS-CBN franchise renewal controversy ===
On July 10, 2020, Fernando is among the 70 representatives who voted "yes" to "kill" (reject) the franchise renewal of ABS-CBN, the largest Philippine television network. The hearing for the network's renewal unearthed several questionable issues, prompting Fernando's vote. He also suggested continuing investigations due to the issues found, and even probing the government agencies that were supposed to oversee compliance and operations of such networks.

=== Clash with Marcelino Teodoro and 2022 Marikina mayoral campaign ===
In December 2020, Marcelino Teodoro submitted a complaint to the Department of Environment and Natural Resources against BFCT, claiming that the flooding caused by the passage of Typhoon Ulysses was a result of the construction firm's land reclamation project along the Marikina River. Fernando denied the claims, commenting that the flooding was the result of the narrowing of the river and the construction of the Manalo Bridge. The department would ultimately approve Teodoro's request to remove the reclaimed land, culminating in Teodoro's ouster from the Nationalist People's Coalition (NPC). Teodoro and his allies would later migrate to the United Nationalist Alliance (UNA).

Fernando would challenge Teodoro for the city's mayoralty, running under NPC, but supported by the banner of TRoPa. His running mate was Tumana Barangay Captain Ziffred Ancheta. He ran on the platform of continuing his policies as mayor and to improve the city's infrastructure. Fernando was defeated in his election bid, only receiving 17.51% of the vote, while the congressional seat he left open by his mayoral campaign was filled by Teodoro's wife Maan.

== Legacy ==
Fernando was known for painting pink of the overpasses, waiting sheds and sidewalk barriers and structure under the flyovers while serving as chairman of the MMDA. The color was later used by Leni Robredo while campaigning for presidency in 2022, which he supported.

Under Fernando's leadership, Marikina transformed into a model of discipline and efficiency. His policies laid the foundation for the city's reputation for cleanliness and orderliness, a legacy that continues today.

Fernando implemented strict sidewalk-clearing operations to remove illegal vendors and obstructions, aiming to improve pedestrian safety and accessibility. These measures were often enforced with a firm approach, earning both praise and criticism. This policy was ultimately continued by succeeding MMDA Chairpersons.

Recognizing the importance of flood control, Fernando initiated river dredging activities to prevent flooding in the metropolis, particularly in Marikina. This proactive approach has been continued by his successors, highlighting its effectiveness in urban management.

Fernando introduced male urinals in public areas to address public urination issues. While innovative, this measure sparked debates about public decency and urban aesthetics.

In 2003, as Fernando was rumored to run for vice president in 2004, he turned down director Carlo J. Caparas' offer to adapt his life into a film due to electoral rules prohibiting candidates from campaigning prior to the campaign period, and stated: "Besides, I don't find my life interesting enough to be turned into a movie because I have not killed anyone and I only have one wife."

== Personal life ==
Fernando was married to Marides Carlos, his successor as mayor of Marikina. They had one daughter named Tala Fernando, who is married to John Paul L. Ang, the eldest son of business magnate Ramon Ang of San Miguel Corporation. Fernando was a former member of the Philippine Independent Church.

=== Death ===
On September 22, 2023, Fernando was rushed to the Quirino Memorial Medical Center in Quezon City after accidentally falling from his house's roof while conducting repairs. The Metro Manila Development Authority later confirmed his death in a statement soon thereafter, as well as his wife Marides and the chief of staff of incumbent Marikina Mayor Marcelino Teodoro. He was 77. He was buried at the Loyola Memorial Park on September 27, 2023.

Political offices
Preceded by Rodolfo B. Valentino	Mayor of Marikina; 1992–2001	Succeeded by Ma. Lourdes Fernando
Preceded by Benjamin Abalos	Chairman of the Metropolitan Manila Development Authority; 2002–2009	Succeeded by Oscar Inocentes
House of Representatives of the Philippines
Preceded by Marcelino Teodoro	Member of the House of Representatives from Marikina's 1st district 2016–2022	Succeeded by Marjorie Ann Teodoro
