= Emerson Carlos =

Filipino lawyer

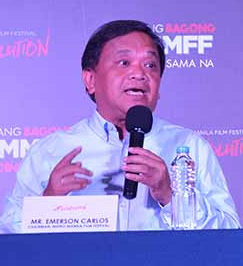
- Carlos in 2016

Chairman of the Metropolitan Manila Development Authority
- In office July 8, 2016 – August 19, 2016
- President: Rodrigo Duterte
- Succeeded by: Thomas Orbos (OIC)
- In office October 1, 2015 – June 30, 2016; Officer-In Charge from October 1–30, 2015
- President: Benigno Aquino III; Rodrigo Duterte
- Preceded by: Francis Tolentino

Assistant general manager for operations of the Metropolitan Manila Development Authority
- In office January 4, 2011 – August 19, 2016
- President: Benigno Aquino III
- Preceded by: Emmanuel A. de Castro
- Succeeded by: Julia Nebrija

Emerson "Murph" S. Carlos is a Filipino lawyer and was the assistant general manager for operations of the Metropolitan Manila Development Authority (MMDA) from January 4, 2011, to October 1, 2015.

Carlos succeeded Tolentino as the chairperson of the MMDA after the latter resigned from his post on October 7, 2016, to run for Senate in the 2016 elections. He was designated as the chairperson of the agency days earlier through Office Order No. 213, a memorandum by Tolentino which went effective on October 1, 2015. The memorandum which indicates that Carlos is to hold the post on an acting capacity, was only received by Carlos on October 7, 2015. He was named as permanent chairperson of the MMDA by then President Benigno Aquino III on October 30, 2016.

He was also the over-all chairman of the Metro Manila Film Festival organizing committee in the final year of Benigno Aquino III's presidency. His term ended on June 30, 2016.

However, 8 days later, he was reappointed as the officer-in-charge of the MMDA under the new administration of President Rodrigo Duterte. Following calls for the resignation of all presidential appointees in a major revamp of the executive department, Carlos stepped down on August 19, 2016, and was replaced by MMDA general manager Thomas Orbos as acting MMDA chairman.

Preceded by Francis Tolentino	Chairman of the Metropolitan Manila Development Authority; 2015–2016	Succeeded by Thomas Orbos
