= Francis Tolentino =

Filipino politician and lawyer (born 1960)

- Official portrait, 2026

Secretary of Labor and Employment
- Acting
- Assumed office May 25, 2026
- President: Bongbong Marcos
- Preceded by: Bienvenido Laguesma

Senate Majority Leader
- In office May 20, 2024 – June 30, 2025
- Preceded by: Joel Villanueva
- Succeeded by: Joel Villanueva

Senator of the Philippines
- In office June 30, 2019 – June 30, 2025
Senate committee chairmanships
Chair of the Senate Blue Ribbon Committee
In office July 25, 2022 – December 19, 2023
Preceded by	Dick Gordon
Succeeded by	Pia Cayetano
Chair of the Senate Justice and Human Rights Committee
In office 2022–2024
Preceded by	Dick Gordon
Succeeded by	Sonny Angara
Chair of the Senate Local Government Committee
In office July 22, 2019 – June 30, 2022
Preceded by	Sonny Angara
Succeeded by	JV Ejercito
Chair of the Senate Urban Planning, Housing, and Resettlement Committee
In office July 22, 2019 – June 30, 2022
Preceded by	JV Ejercito
Succeeded by	JV Ejercito

6th Chairperson of the Metropolitan Manila Development Authority
- In office July 27, 2010 – October 8, 2015
- President: Benigno Aquino III
- Preceded by: Oscar Inocentes
- Succeeded by: Emerson Carlos

Mayor of Tagaytay
- In office January 28, 1994 – June 30, 2004
- Preceded by: Benjamin Erni
- Succeeded by: Abraham Tolentino
- In office 1986–1987; Officer-in-charge
- Appointed by: Corazon Aquino

Personal details
- Born: Francis Ng Tolentino; January 3, 1960 (age 66) Guinobatan, Albay, Philippines
- Party: PFP (2024–present)
- Other political affiliations: PDP (2016–2024); Independent (2004–2016); Lakas–CMD (until 2004)
- Relations: Abraham Tolentino (brother); Athena Tolentino (niece); Aniela Tolentino (niece)
- Children: 3
- Education: Ateneo de Manila University (BA, LL.B); National Defense College of the Philippines (MSNA); University of Michigan (LL.M); University of London (LL.M); Columbia University (LL.M)
- Occupation: Politician
- Profession: Lawyer
- Website: Official website
- Nickname: Tol

Military service
- Allegiance: Philippines
- Branch/service: Philippine Army
- Rank: Brigadier General

Francis Ng Tolentino (Tagalog pronunciation: [nɐŋ tolɛnˈtino], born January 3, 1960) is a Filipino politician and lawyer serving as the acting secretary of labor and employment since 2026. He previously served as a senator of the Philippines from 2019 to 2025; during his term in the Senate, he served as the Senate majority leader from 2024 to 2025 and chairperson of the Senate Blue Ribbon Committee from 2022 to 2023. Before being elected to the Senate, he served as the chairperson of the Metropolitan Manila Development Authority (MMDA) from 2010 to 2015 and mayor of Tagaytay twice: from 1986 to 1987 as an officer in charge (OIC) in the provisional government, and then elected to three consecutive terms from 1995 to 2004.

Tolentino is the principal author of the Senate bill that became the Philippine Maritime Zones Act. This law, which concerns the Philippines' claims in the South China Sea dispute, has been objected by China. As a result, China banned him from entering the country since July 2025.

== Education ==
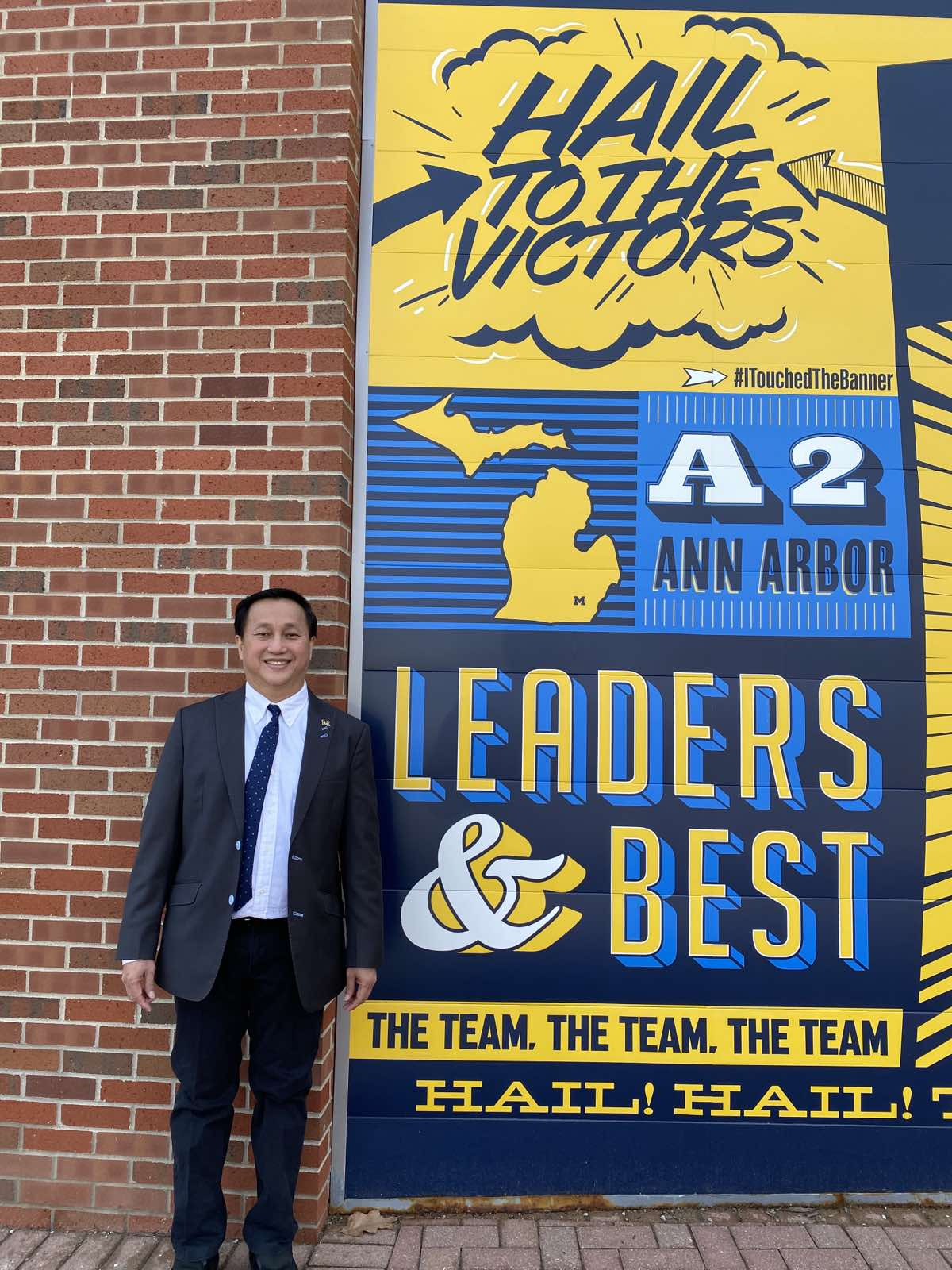
Tolentino at the University of Michigan

Francis Tolentino had his primary education in Lourdes School of Mandaluyong. He studied rigorously and obtained his Bachelor of Arts in Philosophy and Bachelor of Laws degree from the Ateneo de Manila University and his Bachelor of Laws (LLB) from Ateneo de Manila University Law School. He is a member of the Aquila Legis, a fraternity exclusively based at the Ateneo de Manila School of Law.

Tolentino obtained three Master of Laws degrees, one from the University of Michigan Law School in Ann Arbor (USA) where he concentrated on constitutional law, and another from the University of London in England specializing in public international law where he graduated Second Honors (with merit) with Her Royal Highness Princess Anne giving him the award. He obtained his third (3rd) Master of Laws degree (LLM) from the Ivy League Columbia Law School (New York City), where he displayed "superior academic achievement".

He passed the New York State Bar Exams as well as the Philippine Bar Exams in 1984 where he obtained a general average of 86.25%.

Francis Tolentino graduated with a Master’s in National Security Administration at the National Defense College of the Philippines where he ranked 6th out of 55 graduates.

== Political career ==
=== Mayor of Tagaytay City ===
Tolentino was first appointed to the post of OIC Mayor of Tagaytay from 1986 to 1987. In 1992, he ran for mayor of Tagaytay under the Lakas–NUCD, but initially lost to Partido Magdalo candidate Benjamin R. Erni. After filing an election protest in June that year, however, Tolentino was later declared the actual winner by the First Division of the Commission on Elections (COMELEC) on January 28, 1994 after invalid ("stray") ballots were removed, a decision which was later upheld by the COMELEC as a whole on July 25, 1994 and by the Supreme Court in April 1995. Tolentino ran unopposed in the 1995 general election for mayor of Tagaytay and was re-elected by his constituents for three more consecutive terms as mayor from 1995 to 2004. As mayor, he advocated a City Character Program, espousing values formation among his constituents.

Under his administration, he created the Tagaytay Office of Public Safety, which later became the basis of policies he put into force as chair of the MMDA. He also initialized the Character First programs which encourages governments, government leaders, civic organizations and religious organizations to band together to establish a "city" or "community" of character with character traits of a Filipino every month.

=== Chairman of the Metro Manila Development Authority ===
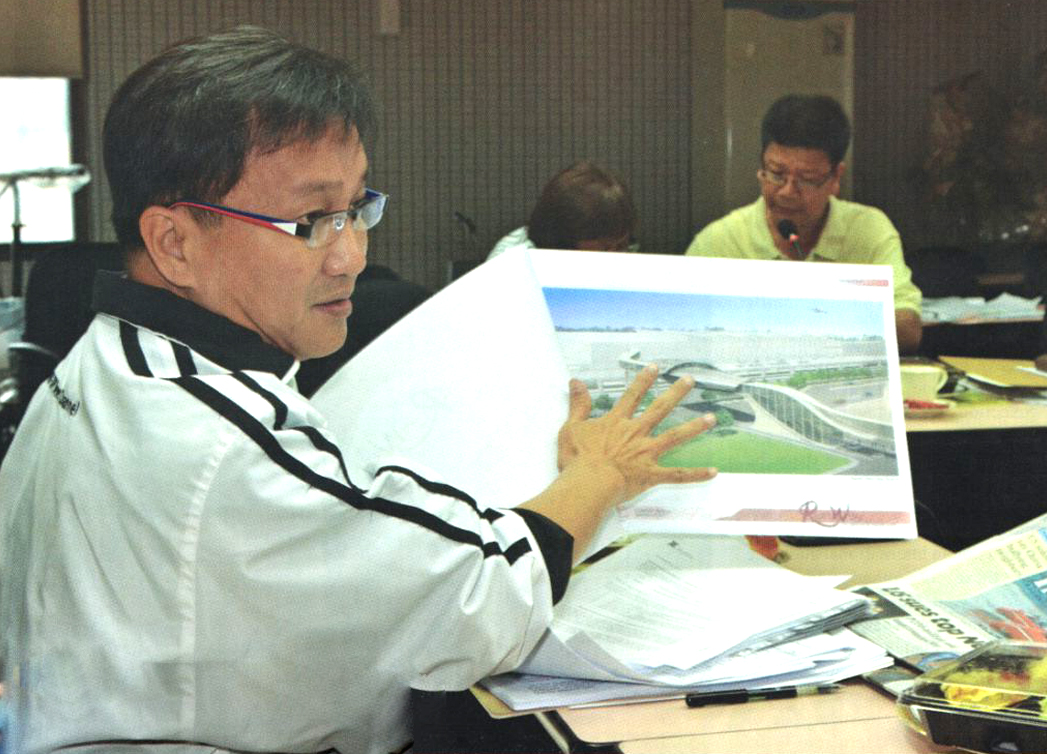
Francis Tolentino as MMDA Chairman

On July 27, 2010, Tolentino was appointed the ninth chairman of the Metropolitan Manila Development Authority (MMDA). He is the first and only non-resident of Metro Manila to be appointed to the post.

In August 2013, Tolentino, as MMDA chairman, launched the first Metro Manila Integrated Bus Terminal known as the Southwest Integrated Provincial Transport Terminal (SWIPTT).

On September 19, 2013, Tolentino signed the Metro Manila Outdoor Media Magna Carta along with various advertising groups, setting the terms for regulating outdoor advertisements in Metro Manila. Among the terms in the 15-page agreement were a 216-square-meter (2,330 sq ft) limitation on all outdoor signs and structures, with 30 percent of the space of ground level ads allotted "for landscape works or vertical gardens". Prior to the signing of the document, no limit had been placed on the size of advertisements, such that a number of billboards as big as 1,000 square meters (11,000 sq ft) had been allowed. The document provided a nine-month grace period for advertisers to be able to comply.

To address the traffic situation in Metro Manila and to offer transportation alternative to the public, Tolentino relaunched the Pasig River Ferry Service in April 2014, in coordination with the Pasig River Rehabilitation Commission and the Department of Transportation and Communications.

As chair of the MMDA, Tolentino was designated by Metro Manila Commission Executive Order No. 86-09 as chair of the annual Metro Manila Film Festival, in which capacity Tolentino introduced a number of changes, including the introduction of new contest categories and the removal of box office receipts from the criteria for the selection of best picture starting from the 2010 edition.

On September 29, 2015, Tolentino announced his intention to run for a Senate seat in the 2016 election with the Liberal Party/Koalisyon ng Daang Matuwid, as well as his forthcoming resignation as MMDA chairman. However, he drew criticism the next day when the Playgirls, a sexy girl group he allegedly sponsored, performed at a Liberal Party event. Tolentino denied the allegation but nonetheless apologized. He also asked to be dropped from the Liberal Party's senatorial lineup. On October 7, he resigned as MMDA chairman; President Aquino formally accepted the resignation on the following day.

In July 2020, the Court of Appeals's Justice Pablito A. Perez, Twelfth Division denied the defamation complaint filed by Tolentino against Ted Failon. The 2017 case stemmed from Failon's commentary of possible misuse of public funds when the MMDA, then headed by Tolentino, purchased second-hand motorcycles. The appellate court ordered the Cavite Regional Trial Court, Branch 18 to dismiss the criminal proceedings.

=== Presidential Adviser for Political Affairs ===
In June 2017, Tolentino was appointed by former President Rodrigo Duterte as his political adviser from 2017 to 2018. He became the former President's main troubleshooter during crises, disasters, and emergencies.

=== Senator ===
Tolentino ran for senator in the 2016 Philippine Senate election and lost, coming in 13th.

Tolentino ran again for senator in the 2019 Philippine Senate election. Endorsed by President Rodrigo Duterte, he ran under the Hugpong ng Pagbabago and the informal Kilusang Pagbabago coalitions. Tolentino successfully secured the 9th place in the 2019 elections and served as a Senator of the Philippines until 2025.

==== 18th Congress ====
During the 18th Congress, Tolentino chaired the Senate Committee on Local Government and the Senate Committee on Urban Planning, Housing, and Resettlement.

During his stint as Chairman of the Senate Committee on Local Government, Tolentino was a welcomed partner by the Bangsamoros in the transition of the Bangsamoro Autonomous Region in Muslim Mindanao.

==== 19th Congress ====
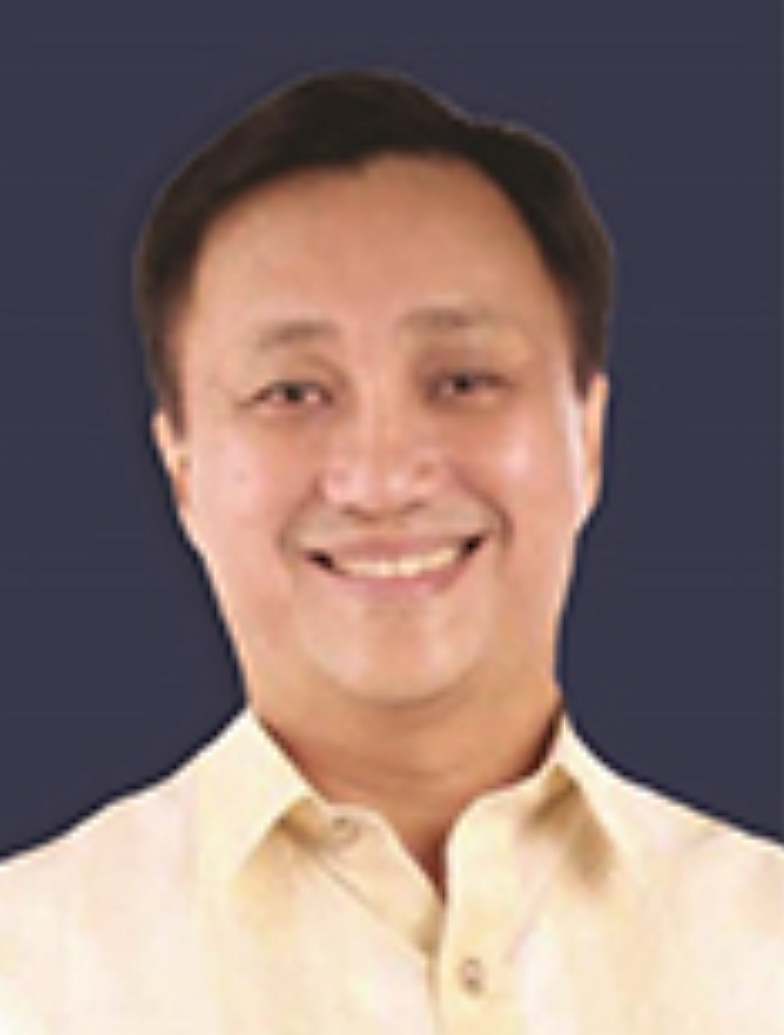
Official portrait of Tolentino as a senator for the 19th Congress, c. 2022

Tolentino formerly served as the chairman of the prestigious Senate Blue Ribbon Committee and the Senate Committee on Justice and Human Rights. He stepped down as Chairman of the Blue Ribbon Committee in March 2024 because of his "deep-seated belief that public office demands fidelity to pledges made." He currently sits as the Senate Representative to the Judicial and Bar Council and is also one of the Senate Representatives in the Commission on Appointments. He is the Senate Majority Floor Leader.

He is currently the vice-chairman in the following Senate committees: Agriculture, Food and Agrarian Reform, Constitutional Amendments and Revision of Codes, Foreign Relations, National Defense and Security, Peace, Unification and Reconciliation, Public Order and Dangerous Drugs, and Public Services.

Tolentino also sits as a member on the following Senate Committees: Basic Education, Cooperatives, Cultural Communities and Muslim Affairs, Electoral Reforms and People's Participation, Energy, Environment, Natural Resources and Climate Change, Finance, Games and Amusement, Labor, Employment and Human Resources Development, Local Government, Migrant Workers, Public Works, Sports, Urban Planning, Housing and Resettlement, and Ways and Means.

On August 5, 2024, Tolentino left the Partido Demokratiko Pilipino party over differences regarding the South China Sea dispute, disagreeing with the party's preference for bilateral dialogue with China, which he believes is not fully aligned with the 2016 arbitral ruling.

Due to his views regarding the South China Sea dispute, he sponsored the unanimously approved Senate Bill No. 2492, or the Philippine Maritime Zones Act, in March 2024. The senator further stated, "As an independent nation, China cannot veto our Maritime Zones Law". As a response, China summons the Philippine ambassador to express their objection. China's foreign ministry spokesperson Mao Ning stated that Tolentino's Maritime Zones Act "illegally includes most of China's Huangyan Island (Scarborough Shoal) and Nansha Islands (Spratly Islands) and related maritime areas in the Philippines' maritime zones".

Being informed that China summoned the Philippine ambassador, Tolentino suggested that the Philippines could also summon the Chinese envoy. He said: "We should not be pressured and bullied into a corner. The mere fact that they are reacting and behaving in that manner is a clear indication that our position is right, based on the might of international law."

Tolentino led Senate inquiries on suspected Chinese espionage in the Philippines.

He relied on his positions on the South China Sea dispute for his re-election campaign for the 2025 midterm elections. He joined President Bongbong Marcos's Senate slate, Alyansa para sa Bagong Pilipinas. He was not successful though in his 2025 re-election bid and stepped down when his term ended on June 30, 2025.

On July 1, 2025, the Chinese government banned Tolentino from entering mainland China, Hong Kong, and Macau. He was banned for his "egregious conduct on China-related issues". Tolentino, in response to the sanction, considered the ban a "badge of honor" which he attributed to his actions in advancing the Philippines' interests in the South China Sea dispute.

=== Secretary of Labor and Employment ===
On May 25, 2026, President Bongbong Marcos appointed Tolentino as the acting secretary of labor and employment, replacing Bienvenido Laguesma who resigned due to health concerns. Tolentino took his oath before President Marcos on the same day.

== Personal life ==
Tolentino was born in Albay, and grew up in Tagaytay, where he lives. He is the first son of Atty. Isaac O. Tolentino, who was the longest-serving mayor of Tagaytay City.

He is currently the president of the Samahan ng Kickboxing ng Pilipinas, the national governing body for kickboxing in the Philippines.

Tolentino, although unmarried, has three children. His son, Michael Francis, has served as a councilor in Tagaytay since 2019.

== Filmography ==
- Because I Love You (2019) as himself

Political offices
Preceded by Benjamin Erni	Mayor of Tagaytay; 1994–2004	Succeeded by Abraham Tolentino
Preceded by Oscar Inocentes	Chairman of the Metropolitan Manila Development Authority; 2010–2015	Succeeded by Emerson Carlos
Preceded by Ronald Llamas	Presidential Adviser on Political Affairs; 2017–2018	Succeeded by Jacinto Paras
Senate of the Philippines
Preceded by JV Ejercito	Chair of the Senate Committee on Urban Planning, Housing and Resettlement; 2019–2022	Succeeded by JV Ejercito
Preceded by Sonny Angara	Chair of the Senate Committee on Local Government; 2019–2022	Succeeded by JV Ejercito
Preceded by Richard Gordon	Chair of the Senate Committee on Justice and Human Rights; 2022–2024	Succeeded by Sonny Angara
Preceded by Richard Gordon	Chair of the Senate Blue Ribbon Committee; 2022–2023	Succeeded by Pia Cayetano
Government offices
Preceded by Bienvenido Laguesma	Secretary of Labor and Employment; 2026–present	Incumbent
Order of precedence
Preceded by Sonny Angara as Secretary of Education	Order of Precedence of the Philippines as Secretary of Labor and Employment	Succeeded by Gilbert Teodoro as Secretary of National Defense
