= Danilo Lim =

Filipino general (1955–2021)

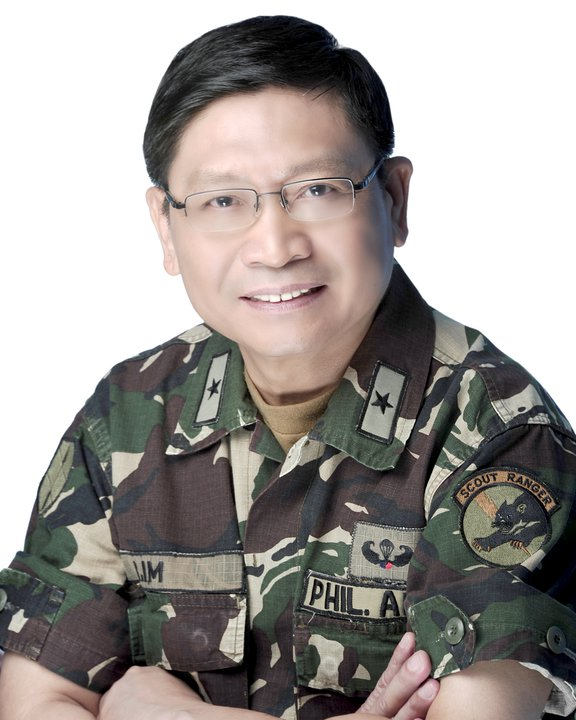
- Lim as part of the Philippine Army

Chairman of the Metropolitan Manila Development Authority
- In office May 22, 2017 – January 6, 2021
- President: Rodrigo Duterte
- Preceded by: Thomas Orbos (OIC)
- Succeeded by: Benhur Abalos

Deputy Commissioner for Intelligence of the Bureau of Customs
- In office September 15, 2011 – July 23, 2013
- President: Benigno Aquino III

Personal details
- Born: Danilo Delapuz Lim; June 2, 1955 Solano, Nueva Vizcaya, Philippines
- Died: January 6, 2021 (aged 65) Manila, Philippines
- Cause of death: COVID-19
- Resting place: Libingan ng mga Bayani, Metro Manila, Philippines
- Party: Independent
- Other political affiliations: Liberal (2010)
- Spouse: Aloysia Tiongson-Lim
- Children: 1
- Education: United States Military Academy; Philippine Military Academy; University of the Philippines
- Occupation: Soldier
- Website: Official website

Military service
- Allegiance: Philippines
- Branch/service: Philippine Army
- Years of service: 1973–2010
- Rank: Brigadier General
- Battles/wars: Jolo, Sulu; 1989 Coup d'État, also known as the "Siege of Makati".

Danilo "Danny" Delapuz Lim (Chinese: 林德才; pinyin: Lín Décái; June 2, 1955 – January 6, 2021) was a Filipino soldier who served as Chair of the Metropolitan Manila Development Authority from 2017 until his death in 2021. He was incarcerated at Camp Crame in Quezon City from 2006 to 2010 for rebellion charges and an attempted coup d'état. After more than 4 years in prison, Lim was granted temporary freedom by the Armed Forces of the Philippines on May 31, 2010.

On November 29, 2007, the same group triggered a standoff at the Peninsula Manila hotel in Makati, where he called for Arroyo's ouster.

On September 20, 2009, Lim announced his plan to join the 2010 senatorial race as an independent candidate where he was invited to join 3 senatorial slates, namely the Liberal Party of then Senator Benigno Aquino III, Pwersa ng Masang Pilipino of former President Joseph Estrada, and former Senator Jamby Madrigal. He assumed the post of Deputy Commissioner of the Bureau of Customs under Aquino's administration, but resigned in July 2013 due to corruption in the bureau.

Lim joined the administration of President Rodrigo Duterte on May 22, 2017, as MMDA chief, replacing acting chairman and general manager Thomas Orbos.

== Biography ==
=== Early life ===
Lim was born on June 2, 1955, in Solano, Nueva Vizcaya, the youngest of five brothers. His father, He Yia Lim, was a Chinese rice trader whose roots can be traced back to Xiamen, China, while his mother, Catalina Delapuz, is from Bohol. The older Lim died when Danilo was still two years old.

He finished elementary and high school in Solano with flying colors. He was in his first year at the University of the Philippines when he took the entrance exams to the Philippine Military Academy. He topped the exams. Lim was a member of the Pagkakaisa Masonic Lodge No. 282, which is under the jurisdiction of The Most Worshipful Grand Lodge of Free and Accepted Masons of the Philippines.

=== Philippine Military Academy ===
Lim was a member of the Philippine Military Academy Makatarungan Class 1978. He was the mistah of adopted member, Gloria Macapagal Arroyo, former President of the Philippines and the former Chief of Staff of the Armed Forces of the Philippines, General Delfin N. Bangit, AFP.

While a plebe, he took the entrance exam to the United States Military Academy (USMA) at West Point, one of the world's premier military academies, because of his outstanding performance as cadet. He topped the exams.

=== Early career ===
After graduation, he returned to the country and took the Scout Ranger Course where he graduated No. 1 and led his team in registering the only encounter of the class during their test mission. He opted to be assigned to Jolo after that. He commanded the forward Recon Unit of the 1st Infantry Division in Sulu where he was wounded twice in combat.

=== Involvement with the Reform the Armed Forces Movement (RAM) ===
Lim was recruited into the rightist Reform the Armed Forces Movement (RAM) during the 1980s and was involved in the People Power Revolution, but came into public knowledge during the botched 1989 Coup d'État against the Cory Aquino government. It was Lim, along with Captain Abraham Puruganan, who led the 1st Scout Ranger Regiment into what has been known as the "Siege of Makati."

=== Manila Peninsula Incident ===
On the morning of November 29, 2007, Antonio Trillanes IV, Lim, Capt. Nicanor Faeldon and other Magdalo officials walked out of their trial and marched through the streets of Makati, calling for the ouster of President Gloria Macapagal Arroyo. They then had a meeting on the second floor of The Peninsula Manila Hotel along Ayala Avenue. Former vice-president Teofisto Guingona joined the march to the hotel, as well as some soldiers from the AFP.

A website forthwith appeared, proclaiming General Lim and Senator Antonio Trillanes IV as the leaders of the incident. The website entry read: "Senator Antonio Trillanes, Brig. Gen. Danilo Lim, Magdalo soldiers, their guards and the people have started marching towards Makati triangle. We presently find in existence a dangerous concept where the armed forces now owe their primary allegiance and loyalty to those who temporarily exercise the authority of the executive branch of the government rather than to the country and the Constitution they have sworn to protect. That is a concept we defy and struggle to eradicate. If you believe you are a man of will and courage with unselfish motives and brave enough to fight against such tyranny, rise up and be counted!"

The Philippine National Police (PNP) gave Trillanes and Lim until 3 p.m. to surrender, as it evacuated guests and personnel inside the Manila Peninsula Hotel. Lim said that they were undertaking the "fateful step of removing Mrs. Macapagal-Arroyo from the presidency and undertake the formation of a new government."

Security forces arrived at the hotel to arrest the rebels. Judge Oscar Pimentel, Makati Regional Trial Court, issued the arrest order. Sporadic warning shots were heard from the police outside the hotel, as smoke was seen coming from the hotel seconds after the shots. At around 4:01 p.m., as armored personnel carriers arrived. Hundreds of guests scrambled to vacate, and Trillanes said they will 'wait and see'.

Firing stopped at 4:30 p.m. Tear gas was fired into the hotel lobby as government troops advanced. Soldiers surrounded the hotel at 5 p.m.

A V150 armored car then destroyed the main facade of the Manila Peninsula Hotel to allow the troops to enter, whereupon Trillanes, Lim and most other officers surrendered.

== Awards in the military service ==
- Philippine Republic Presidential Unit Citation
- Martial Law Unit Citation
- People Power I Unit Citation
- Distinguished Service Star
- Bronze Cross Medal
- Gold Cross Medal
- Military Merit
- Wounded Personnel Medal
- Military Commendation Medals
- Military Civic Action Medal
- Disaster Relief & Rehabilitation Operation Ribbon
- Anti-Dissidence Campaign Medal
- Luzon Anti Dissidence Campaign Medal
- Mindanao Anti-dissidence Campaign Medal
- Long Service Medal
- Scout Ranger Qualification Badge
- Special Forces Qualification Badge

== Temporary liberty ==
On February 16, 2010, Lim was allowed by a Makati court to post bail on a rebellion charge, along with Senator Antonio Trillanes IV and 16 other soldiers. The bail was set for P200,000 each. The bail was supposed to give them temporary liberty while the case is being heard. However, they cannot leave the prison yet; Armed Forces spokesman Lt. Col. Romeo Brawner Jr. said: “The group of Senator Trillanes cannot be released until after the military has agreed already, because they are still facing general court martial." Brawner also added: “Under the military law, there is no such thing as bail."

After 4 years in detention, on May 31, 2010, Lim was granted temporary freedom by the Armed Forces of the Philippines (AFP), which approved his request to be placed under the custody of another military officer. AFP Chief of Staff Gen. Delfin Bangit also approved the grant of temporary liberty to Lim. After proper custodial procedures and medical examination were conducted, the retired Brigadier General was released 5:35 p.m. from the Philippine National Police (PNP) Custodial Center in Camp Crame in Quezon City. Lim, however, still faced a charge of violation of Article 67 (mutiny) of the Articles of War in relation to a supposed plan to grab power last February 2006. His co-accused in the 2006 case include former Marine commandant Maj. Gen. Renato Miranda and former Marine Col. Ariel Querubin. He was also charged with violation of Articles of War 63 (disrespect to the President), 96 (conduct unbecoming of an officer and a gentleman), 97 (conduct prejudicial to good order and military discipline), and 70 (escape from confinement). These charges are in connection with the November 2007 Manila Peninsula Incident.

== Political career ==
=== Senatorial race in 2010 ===
On September 20, 2009, Lim declared his intention to run for senator in 2010. He filed his certificate of candidacy (COC) for senator on November 27, 2009. When interviewed by some reporters, the Brigadier General said: "I would like to bring the people's awareness on corruption to a higher level, so that the issue of corruption will not be limited to one branch of the government." He also added: "I have served the military for 36 years and throughout my 36 years of military service, I have been consistent in advocating reforms in the military, but the military career being behind me now, this is now my alternative arena." Under existing laws, all active military and police personnel are forced to resign from the service after filing their respective certificates of candidacy for any elective posts. As a result, Lim had to leave his military position. Lim is not allowed to get out of detention to campaign. He has also been endorsed by Senators Gregorio "Gringo" Honasan, Antonio Trillanes IV. Senator Jamby Madrigal also threw her support behind Lim.

Initially an independent candidate, he later joined the Liberal Party (LP) as a guest candidate. The LP was fielding senators Benigno 'Noynoy' Aquino III and Manuel 'Mar' Roxas II. At first, General Lim intended to run under the Magdalo Para Sa Pagbabago, but the Commission on Elections denied the group's accreditation to become a political party.

In December, the Commission on Elections (COMELEC) disqualified Lim from the 2010 Senate race, as the poll body did not think Lim had the capacity to run in national elections. A few days later, Lim submitted evidence seeking to reverse the Comelec's decision. LP spokesman Representative Lorenzo Tañada III said: "The LP believes that the Comelec will reconsider its previous decision and allow Gen. Danny Lim to run for senator under the LP banner." A month later, the Comelec reinstated Lim as an official candidate for Senator, along with Nicanor Perlas, who was running for president.

However, Lim was not as lucky as Antonio Trillanes in 2007. Several presidential aspirants courted the Magdalo group prior to the official campaign period; the Magdalo also received financial support from some close people in the Philippine Military Academy, the Guardians (a fraternity of soldiers led by Senator Gregorio Honasan), assorted businessmen, and party-list groups. These efforts were only enough to push Lim to 17th place in the senatorial race with over 6 million votes as of Comelec tallies released on 2 p.m. Tuesday (May 11). On May 11, the former brigadier general conceded defeat, after partial election results by the COMELEC showed him far from the top 12 aspirants.

=== MMDA chairman ===
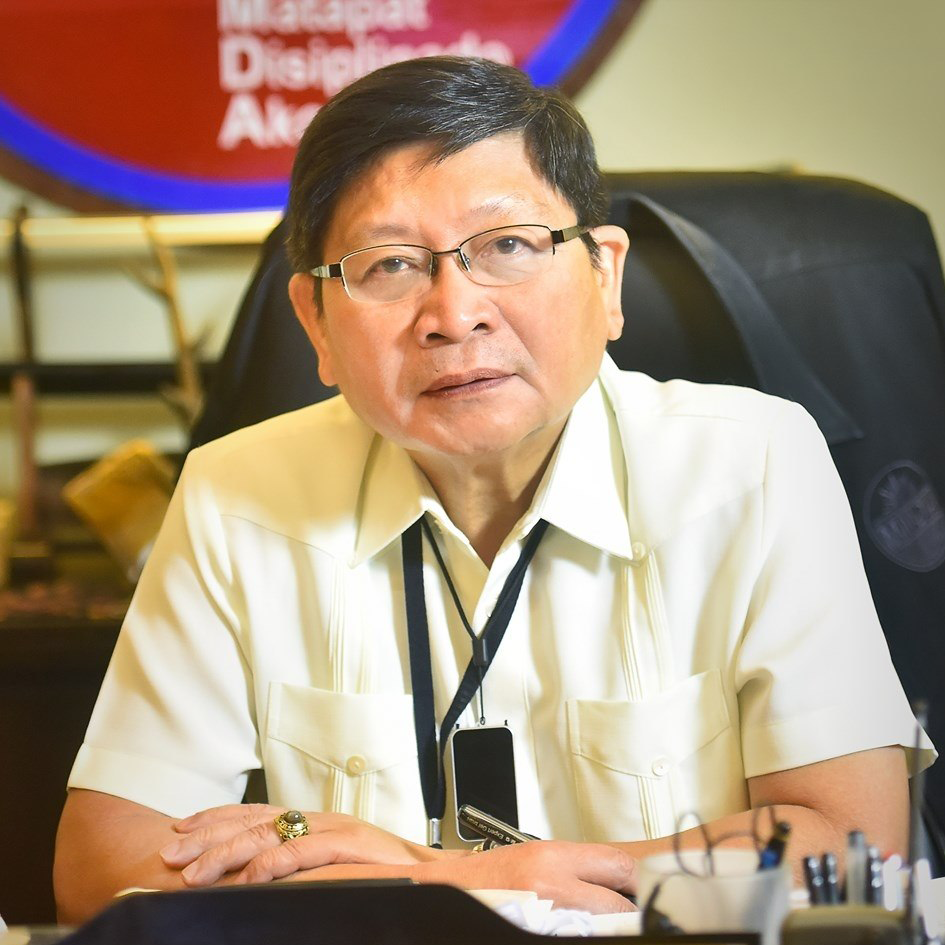
Lim as chair of the Metropolitan Manila Development Authority.

President Rodrigo Duterte appointed Lim as chairman of the Metropolitan Manila Development Authority (MMDA) on May 22, 2017, taking over from officer in charge and general manager Thomas Orbos. Lim died in office in January 2021.

== Personal life and death ==
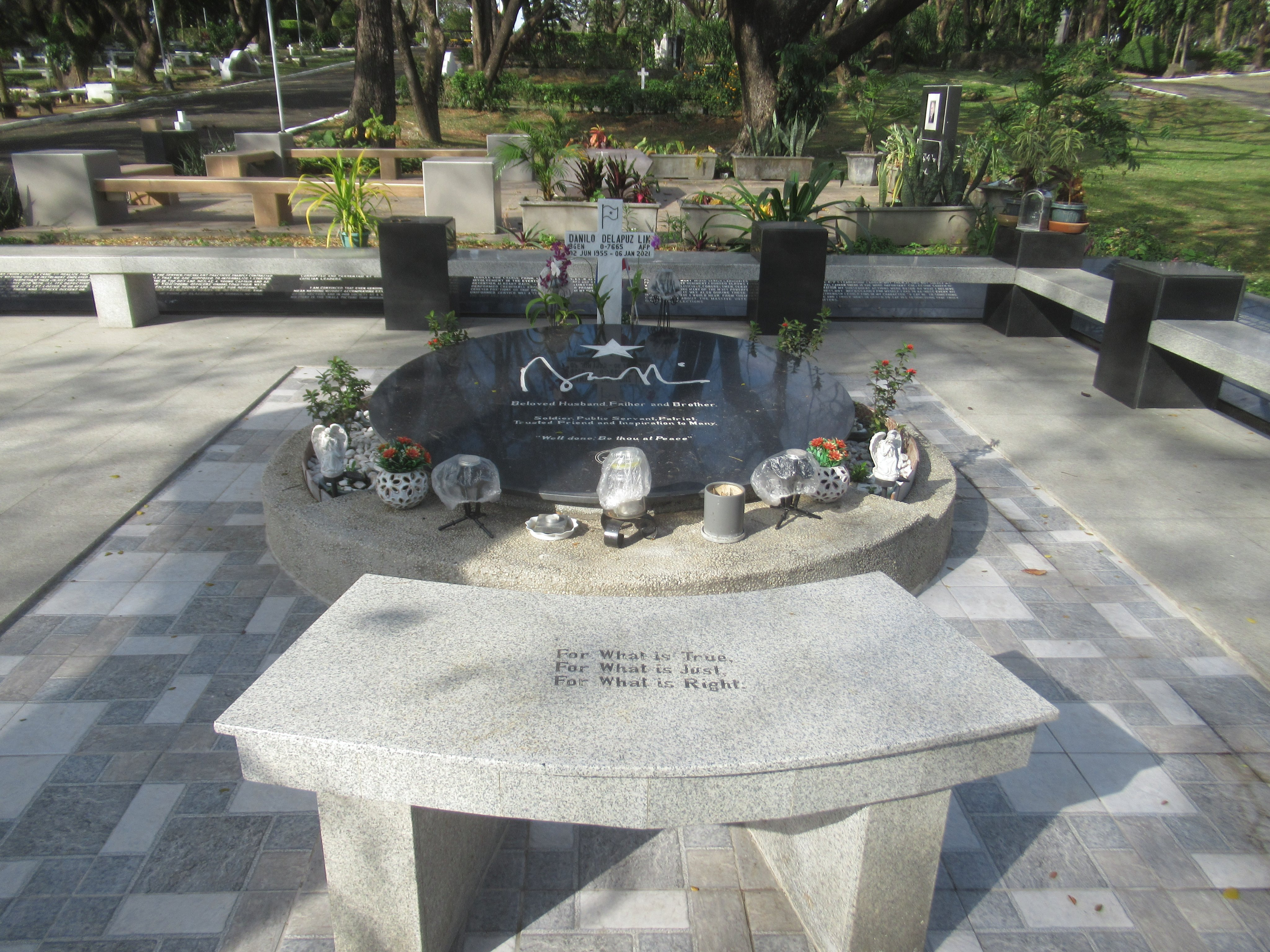
Lim's grave at the Libingan ng mga Bayani

Lim was married to Aloysia Tiongson and they had one daughter together.

Lim tested positive for COVID-19 on December 29, 2020, during the COVID-19 pandemic in Metro Manila. He died from cardiac arrest on January 6, 2021, at age 65. His remains were cremated and buried with military honors at the Libingan ng mga Bayani.

Political offices
Preceded by Thomas Orbos; Acting	Chairman of the Metropolitan Manila Development Authority; 2017–2021	Succeeded by Benjamin Abalos Jr.
