= Oscar Inocentes =

Filipino politician

Chairman of the Metropolitan Manila Development Authority
- In office November 25, 2009 – July 27, 2010
- President: Gloria Macapagal Arroyo; Benigno Aquino III
- Preceded by: Bayani Fernando
- Succeeded by: Francis Tolentino

Personal details
- Born: September 16, 1931 Manila, Philippines
- Died: February 3, 2017 (aged 85) Makati, Philippines
- Resting place: Manila Memorial Park

Oscar "Oca" Inocentes (September 16, 1931 – February 3, 2017) was a Filipino lawyer and politician who was chairman of the Metropolitan Manila Development Authority of the Republic of the Philippines. He is also known as part of the prosecutor team for the Maggie de la Riva rape case.

Preceded by Bayani Fernando	Chairman of the Metropolitan Manila Development Authority; 2009– 2010	Succeeded by Francis Tolentino
