= Marikina Science High School =

- Mataas na Paaralang Pang-Agham ng Marikina

- View of MariSci's building located in Kalumpang Elementary School (KES)

Location
- Kagitingan St., Kalumpang; Marikina, Metro Manila; Philippines; 14°37′20″N 121°05′25″E

Information
- Former name: Marikina Institute of Science and Technology Secondary Level (MIST) (September 5, 1978- November 8, 2001)
- Type: Public science high school
- Motto: Where academic excellence and character are lived and practiced.
- Established: November 8, 2001 (split off of MIST); February 5, 2002 (official founding date)
- Educational authority: Schools Divisions Office - Marikina
- Principal: Juanito H. Gayola
- Grades: 7 to 12
- Enrollment: 1103 (S.Y. 2025−2026)
- Language: English, Filipino, Japanese, Mandarin
- Campus: Rodriguez Building (Main Campus); Kalumpang Elementary School (Kalumpang Campus)
- Area: 3,100 sq. m. (approximate)
- Colors: Golden yellow and dark blue
- Nickname: MariSci, MSHS
- Publication: The Shoeland (English); Ang Sapatusan (Filipino)

Marikina Science High School (MSHS) (Filipino: Mataas na Paaralang Pang-Agham ng Marikina), also known as MariSci, is a Philippine public science high school located in Kalumpang, Marikina.

MariSci was established on November 8, 2001, (Note: Since 2020, Marikina Science High School has officially recognized February 5, 2002 as the school's founding date.) after the secondary level of the Marikina Institute of Science and Technology (MIST) separated from the school. The current principal is Juanito H. Gayola, who took over the position in October 2024.

The school previously operated at its main campus in Mayor Juan Chanyungco St., Sta. Elena, Marikina, but parts of the main building started to fall into disuse by the mid-to-late 2010's. Plans to renovate the building started in 2019 and construction was set to start in August 2022 but was put to a stop due to land ownership conflicts with the Marikina Polytechnic College.

In 2022, the school moved all of its students and operations to the buildings of Kalumpang Elementary School (KES) and Kalumpang National High School (KNHS) amidst the land ownership disputes. In 2025, construction finally started at the main campus for a new 5-story building.

== History ==
=== Origins (1947−1978) ===
Marikina Science High School traces its origin back to July 18, 1947, with the establishment of Marikina Junior High School (later renamed Marikina High School in 1949) through Municipal Council Resolution No. 59 s. 1947. The school was founded by the administration of mayor Gil Fernando alongside Tomas L. Santos after World War II in an effort to jumpstart higher education in what was then, the town of Marikina. Fernando would later be known as the "Father of Secondary Education" in Marikina. The school building was originally a two-room Gabaldon-type building made of craft materials from the demolished military barracks of an airfield in Parang, Marikina that was used by the Philippine-American Forces during the war.

On July 18, 1952, Marikina High School changed its name to the Leodegario Victorino Memorial High School (LVMHS) in honor of Leodegario Victorino, a former councilor in Marikina and the first Marikenyo to serve as Division Superintendent of Schools in Rizal.

On July 1, 1957, it was re-established as the Marikina School of Arts and Trades (MSAT) through R.A. 1586, authored by House Representative for Rizal's 2nd district, Serafin Salvador.

=== Marikina Institute of Science and Technology (1978−2004) ===
The school was renamed to Marikina Institute of Science and Technology (MIST) on May 8, 1978, under the approval of Malacañang. In 1981, MIST was selected as the National Center for Technical Education and Staff Development (NCTESD) by the Technical Vocational Education Project of the Philippines (TVEP) due to its experience and capability in the field of technical education and training.

After the creation of the Commission on Higher Education (CHED) in 1994, the supervision of MIST was transferred from the Department of Education, Culture, and Sports to CHED. In 2000, supervision was transferred to the Technical Education and Skills Development Authority (TESDA). This provision also required the phase-out of the baccalaureate degree programs composed of the Bachelor of Science in Industrial Education and the Bachelor of Secondary Education; the laboratory high school; and the graduate studies program.

=== Marikina Science High School (2001−present) ===
On November 8, 2001, the secondary level of Marikina Institute of Science and Technology separated and was established into Marikina Science High School. On April 14, 2004, MIST's remaining college department was converted into a state college and was renamed the Marikina Polytechnic College (MPC) through R.A. 9289.

In 2004, the school opened a second campus called the Annex Campus or Annex, which was built in order to accommodate more students. The Annex Campus is located at Panama St. Greenheights Subdivision, Brgy. Concepcion Uno. Freshmen had their classes at the Annex while the other grade levels had their classes at the Main Campus until 2007, when admission of freshmen had been reduced, so graduating levels also had their classes at the Annex.

The inside of the Electronic Learning Resource Center. (2008)

In 2008, the school opened the Electronic Learning Resource Center (e-LRC) at the Main Campus, which had 19 computers all connected to the internet. The center was inaugurated by Mayor Marides Fernando on July 4, 2008. The inauguration also featured a demonstration of various robotics activities such as Lego robotics and microcontrollers by 4th year students.

In 2010, through the initiative of Principal Edgardo L. Nieto, the Annex Campus was donated to the Pamantasan ng Lungsod ng Marikina (PLMAR) to help the college house more students. The campus is currently being used by PLMAR Senior High School.

==== Renovation of the Main Campus (2019−present) ====
The entrance to MariSci's main campus in 2018

Starting in 2019, MariSci started planning for a renovation of the Main Campus (also known as the Rodriguez Building), as portions of the building started to fall under disuse. The construction for the building was set to start at August 2022 but had stopped because the portion of land the main campus stood was owned by the Marikina Polytechnic College, leading to a dispute between the Marikina City government and MPC.

In August 2022, during the return of face-to-face classes, Mayor Marcy Teodoro expressed his concerns for the main campus and advocated for the construction of a new building.

In September 2022, representatives Maan Teodoro of Marikina's 1st district and Arnan Panaligan of Oriental Mindoro's 1st district authored House Bill No. 5267, which sought to resolve the land ownership issue by amending Section 15 of R.A. 9289, which stated, "All parcels of land belonging to the government and occupied by the MIST are hereby declared property of the Polytechnic College and shall be titled under that name".

From late 2022 to early 2023, MariSci moved all of its students into the buildings of Kalumpang Elementary School (KES) and Kalumpang National High School (KNHS). These buildings have since been called the Kalumpang Campus. The borrowed buildings had limited capacity, and the classrooms were not enough for all of MariSci's students, especially in the KES building where the Junior High School students (Grades 7 to 10) were at. To resolve this, the school adopted a blended learning modality in which students from Grades 7 and 8 are scheduled to go to school on Mondays and Wednesdays, while Grades 9 and 10 are scheduled on Tuesdays and Thursdays. The main campus remained in partial use throughout 2023 for special events.

In 2023, The representative for Marikina's 2nd district Stella Quimbo proposed to DepEd plans to put up MariSci's new building on the land the Rodriguez Building currently stood on, to which MPC's board agreed to put the site on offer under a usufruct agreement that would allow DepEd to temporarily use the site for the construction. The planned building is five-storeys tall and has 29 classrooms. The construction is estimated to cost ₱660 million and is going to be part of three buildings to be funded under DepEd's ₱2 billion infrastructure budget for specialized schools in Marikina, Pasig, and Bacoor. The plans were forwarded to DepEd Regional Director Wilfredo Cabral in January, but no further response was made.

According to DepEd's Undersecretary for School Infrastructure and Facilities Epimaco Densing III, DepEd had insisted for the new building to be built at the parking lot between the Marikina City Hall and the Hall of Justice, citing the proposed site at the MPC did not meet the minimum requirement of 2,000 meters for a mid-rise building, and that the proposed site required demolition of the existing Rodriguez Building, which would delay the construction timeline. DepEd's Sites and Titling Office Director Christian Rivero also added that "there was hesitation" on DepEd overseeing the matter because of the ownership dispute.

Quimbo replied stating that if DepEd had acted on the MPC's 2023 usufruct proposal, the old MariSci building would have been demolished by now and the number of square meters would be met. Quimbo also had copies of the titles and emphasized that the MPC owned the land, and that they had purchased it from the National Housing Authority in 1981.

On March 10, 2025, a groundbreaking ceremony was held at the Main Campus officially starting construction of the new campus. The ceremony was attended by officials including DepEd Secretary Sonny Angara, Senator Koko Pimentel, Representative Stella Quimbo, Vice Mayor Marion Andres, and others.

Even though MariSci had been operating primarily at Kalumpang for 4 years, their official address was still located at Sta. Elena, which caused confusion with parents and applying students. In 2026, they eventually started changing their address to Kagitingan St., Kalumpang.

== Organization ==
=== Principals ===
Since its foundation in 2001, there have been 11 principals at Marikina Science High School. Lauro Z. De Guzman is the school's first and longest-serving principal, having served for 7 years and 283 days. The school's 11th and current principal is Juanito H. Gayola, who took the role on October 9, 2024.

1	Lauro Z. De Guzman	November 9, 2001 – August 20, 2009
2	Edgardo L. Nieto.	August 24, 2009 – July 4, 2010
3	Albert B. Mutia	July 5, 2010 – June 11, 2012
4	Victoria D. Naranja	June 12, 2012 – August 20, 2014
5	Alberto D. Villamor	August 22, 2014 – September 15, 2016
6	Emily G. Santos	September 16, 2016 – January 20, 2017
*	Dr. Nida P. Andrada	January 21, 2017 – February 15, 2017
*	Maria A. Nicolas	February 16, 2017 – August 4, 2017
7	Jeanette J. Coroza	August 5, 2017 – June 17, 2019
8	Janet S. Amurao	June 18, 2019 – July 3, 2020
9	Maria. A. Nicolas	July 4, 2020 – August 11, 2022
10	Joseph T. Santos	August 12, 2022 − October 8, 2024
11	Juanito H. Gayola	October 9, 2024 − present

== Admission ==
Grade 6 students who are bona fide residents of Marikina can take the Unified Science High School Admissions Test (USHAT) entrance exam. Students who pass the examination move on to the interview which primarily tests reading comprehension. Those who pass both the examination and interview are eligible for admission.

In 2011, the school system decided to remove the requirement for incoming students to have residency in Marikina. This opened the school to accepting residents from neighboring areas such as Quezon City, Pasig, Antipolo, Cainta and San Mateo, Rizal.

== Achievements ==
- Well-Managed School, Division of Marikina: 2004, 2007
- Division Secondary Schools Press Conference, Division of Marikina: 1999-2010, 2012-2016 (first place), 2011 (second place), 2017 (third place)
- Regional Schools Press Conference, National Capital Region: 2012 (fourth place)
- Division of Marikina Superintendent's Award recipient: 2014-2015 (CGO Initiative)
- Annual Reading Proficiency Contest, Regional Level: 1999, 2009, 2012 (first place)

== Controversy ==
In 2020, students and alumni of Marikina Science High School made posts on Twitter about allegations of sexual harassment by staff and members of faculty towards the students, using the hashtag #MariSciDoBetter. The posts were part of a wider movement in social media by students from various schools in the Philippines to spread awareness and call for the administrations to take action against sexual misconduct committed by their teachers and staff.

== Notable alumni ==
- Bayani Fernando - mechanical engineer; mayor of Marikina (1992-2001); Chairman of the Metropolitan Manila Development Authority (2002-2009); Secretary of the Department of Public Works and Highways (2003); member of the House of Representatives (2016–2022)
- Marcelino Teodoro - member of the House of Representatives (2007-2016, 2025−present); mayor of Marikina (2016–2025)
