= Raffy Tulfo =

Senator of the Philippines since 2022 and broadcaster (born 1960)

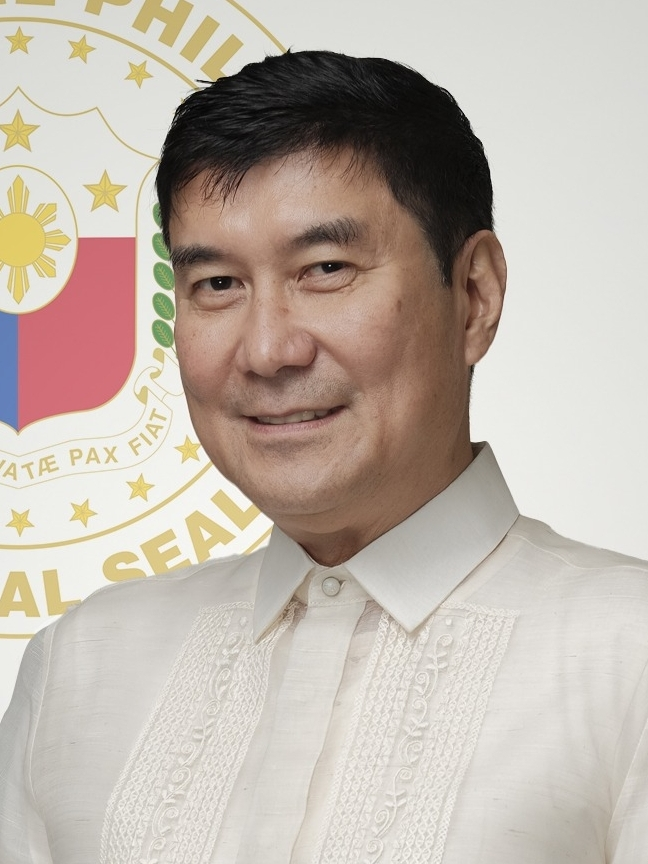
- Official portrait, 2022

Senator of the Philippines
- Incumbent
- Assumed office June 30, 2022
Committee positions
Chair of the Senate Labor, Employment and Human Resources Development Committee
Incumbent
Assumed office September 8, 2025
Preceded by	Imee Marcos
Chair of the Senate Public Services Committee
Incumbent
Assumed office May 22, 2024
Preceded by	Grace Poe
Chair of the Senate Migrant Workers Committee
Incumbent
Assumed office July 25, 2022
Chair of the Senate Energy Committee
In office July 25, 2022 – May 22, 2024
Preceded by	Win Gatchalian
Succeeded by	Pia Cayetano

Personal details
- Born: Rafael Teshiba Tulfo; March 12, 1960 (age 66) Quezon City, Rizal, Philippines
- Party: Independent (since 2021)
- Spouse: Jocelyn Pua (m. 1993)
- Relations: Ramon Tulfo (brother); Wanda Tulfo Teo (sister); Ben Tulfo (brother); Erwin Tulfo (brother)
- Children: Grendy Licup Tulfo (b. 1984) (Note: As claimed by Julieta Licup Pearson, who claimed to be Tulfo's first wife.); Maricel Tulfo Tungol (b. 1992); Ralph Tulfo (b. 1996)
- Occupation: Broadcast journalist; television personality; radio presenter; newspaper columnist
- Other names: Idol Raffy "Action Man" (Wanted sa Radyo)

YouTube information
- Channel: Raffy Tulfo in Action
- Years active: 2016–present
- Genres: Commentary; news; public service
- Subscribers: 30.1 million
- Views: 18.45 billion
- Last updated: 06/02/2026

Rafael Teshiba Tulfo (Tagalog: [ˈɾafi ˈtulfo]; born March 12, 1960) is a Filipino politician, broadcast journalist, and media personality who has served as a senator of the Philippines since 2022.

His works are focused on government and private sector issues, and he is best known as the host of the long-running public affairs radio program Wanted sa Radyo, and the former anchor of Aksyon sa Tanghali from 2014 to 2020 that featured the segment "Ipa-Raffy Tulfo Mo". His YouTube channel Raffy Tulfo in Action, which features videos from both shows, is the third-most subscribed Filipino YouTube channel as of 2021.

Tulfo sought a seat in the Philippine senate in the 2022 election and won placing third overall with 23 million votes. Tulfo serves as the Chairman of the Senate Committee on Energy and Senate Committee on Migrant Workers.

== Early life ==
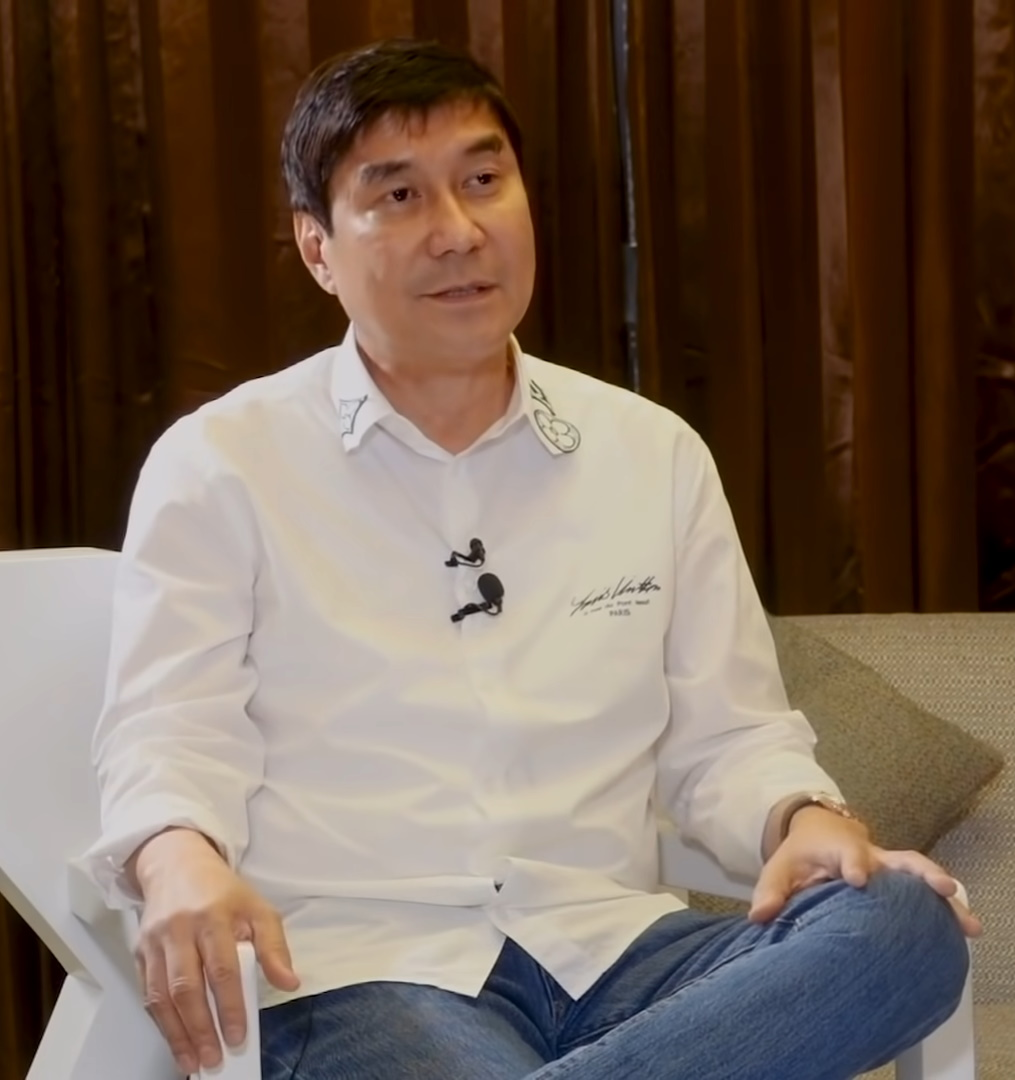
Tulfo in 2021

Rafael Teshiba Tulfo was born in Quezon City on March 12, 1960. He is the son of Ramon Tulfo Sr., a colonel in the Philippine Constabulary, and Caridad (née Teshiba), a housewife, who died in 2024, at the age of 97. He is the eighth out of ten siblings which includes Tuchi, Bong, Joseph, Edelle, broadcasters Ramon, Ben, Erwin, as well as former tourism secretary Wanda Corazon Teo. Tulfo would describe his family as middle class.

A college dropout, Tulfo spent four years in different universities and studied several majors including economics, political science, agribusiness and commerce but did not finish a degree before becoming a journalist.

== Broadcast career ==
Tulfo is associated with TV5. Although he would start his broadcasting career with the People's Television Network (PTV).

Tulfo's first television program was Philippines' Most Wanted which aired from 1995 to 2002. He co-hosted it with Nina Taduran. The program was produced by his uncle and aunt. It was with Most Wanted when Tulfo began to be referred to as "idol".

He would be known for the radio broadcast program Wanted sa Radyo as well in YouTube for Raffy Tulfo in Action (RTIA).

== Political career ==
Tulfo would endorse the ACT-CIS Partylist for the 2019 House of Representatives elections, with the organization managing to garner three seats in the lower house. He himself in August 2019, has initially stated that he had no plans to enter politics as a candidate in the 2022 elections insisting that he is satisfied in his current situation and would focus on "public service".

On October 2, 2021, Tulfo would change his mind and filed his certificate of candidacy for senator as an independent candidate for the 2022 senatorial election. On February 8, 2022, he joined the senatorial slate of presidential candidate Manny Pacquiao. Tulfo finished in third place, receiving 23,396,954 votes, and was proclaimed as Senator on May 18, 2022. Tulfo was later elected as the Chairman of the Senate Committee on Energy.

=== Senate of the Philippines (2022–present) ===
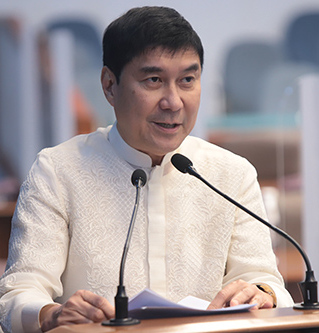
Tulfo in 2022

At the start of the 19th Congress in July 2022, Tulfo filed his priority bills which include protecting Filipino workers from abusive employers and providing discounts for poor job applicants. He also filed a bill amending the Anti-Violence Against Women and Children Act to protect all family members from violence. Amid rising electricity rates in Mindanao and other parts of the Philippines in August 2022, Tulfo called for a Senate investigation into the rotational blackouts in the country and filed a Senate resolution seeking to avert the imminent energy crisis.

In 2023, Tulfo filed a bill legalizing and regulating the underground importation of ukay-ukay second-hand products which already evolved as part of Filipino culture. He later filed a bill mandating all providers of critical infrastructure services such as power generation and distribution, water supply, healthcare, transportation, communications, and financial services to respond within two hours from the time of emergency service requests. He also filed a bill establishing security monitoring systems such as CCTV cameras in all prison cells to ensure the safety of inmates and prison personnel.

Between February and April, Tulfo filed Senate resolutions seeking to probe reports of bullying within the hospital hierarchy, investigate reported delays of the Social Security System in processing retirement and death claims of its members, conduct an inquiry into reported inhumane treatment of patients and possible corruption at the National Center for Mental Health, and investigate "arrogant and condescending" government employees which he says are creating "an atmosphere of fear and mistrust" in government institutions.

In May 2023, amid several power outages in Luzon and growing tension between the Philippines and China, Tulfo filed a senate resolution investigating the National Grid Corporation of the Philippines to verify if it poses a threat to national security for being 40 percent owned by the State Grid Corporation of China.

=== Potential 2028 presidential bid ===
In regard to a potential 2028 presidential bid, Tulfo's brother Erwin in April 2024 insists that Raffy does not want to run for the position. Raffy Tulfo would affirm the lack of interest, requesting survey organizations to "exclude his name" in opinion polls for the upcoming vote and people to support the incumbent administration of President Bongbong Marcos out of courtesy.

== Controversies ==
From 1996 to 1999, Tulfo wrote a series of articles in his Abante Tonite column alleging anomalous and illegal activities by officials of the Bureau of Customs. In April 1999, Tulfo, together with publisher Allen Macasaet and managing editor Nicolas Quijano Jr., were charged with libel by customs lawyer Carlos So.

In February 2005, the Pasay City Regional Trial Court found Tulfo, Macasaet and Quijano guilty of 14 counts of libel and were sentenced to up to 32 years of imprisonment and ordered to pay a fine of ₱14,700,000 (equivalent to ₱25,979,202 in 2021) total. In June 2021, the Supreme Court acquitted Tulfo of the libel charges.

In March 2004, Tulfo published an article in his Abante Tonite column accusing businessman Michael Guy of seeking help from former finance secretary Juanita Amatong to halt a tax fraud investigation by the Department of Finance’s Revenue Integrity Protection Service (RIPS). The claim was proven false, as the RIPS only investigates government officials and did not have jurisdiction over Guy.

In February 2010, the Makati Regional Trial Court convicted Tulfo and seven representatives from Abante's publisher of libel, and were ordered to pay a total of ₱10,211,200 (equivalent to ₱14,205,716 in 2021) to Michael Guy for damages and attorney's fees. In July 2019, the Supreme Court upheld the conviction and increased the amount of damages needed to be paid.

In January 2007, Tulfo and his brothers Ramon and Erwin, each posted bail after a Quezon City Regional Trial Court judge issued warrants for their arrests following a libel complaint by then-first gentleman Mike Arroyo. The brothers had previously accused Arroyo of using his influence to force the government-sequestered station RPN to cancel their investigative news program Isumbong Mo! (Tulfo Brothers). In July 2007, the libel case against the brothers was dismissed.

In June 2014, Tulfo posted bail for an arrest warrant issued by the Quezon City Regional Trial Court after Senior Police Officer III Abubakhar Manlangit filed a libel case against him and his brother Erwin. The policeman, who appeared in a November 2011, episode of T3, also filed an MTRCB complaint against the brothers after being called a "thief" on air, which contributed to a 20-day suspension of the program.

In April 2022, Tulfo's Senate bid faced a disqualification case due his conviction for the crime of libel.

In 2023, the Daily Tribune reported that Raffy Tulfo has been a product endorser of the 1UP brand by Superbreakthrough Enterprises, a company which the Securities and Exchange Commission has issued a cease and desist order for illegally soliciting investments. Tulfo's camp has reasoned that his endorsement is on assuring the quality of 1UP products rather than the operations of Superbreakthrough.

== Personal life ==
Tulfo is married to Jocelyn Pua, the incumbent representative for ACT-CIS Partylist since 2019. They had two wedding ceremonies – at the Office of the Municipal Circuit Trial Court in Luna, Isabela on June 24, 1993, and at the Little Quiapo restaurant in Quezon City on January 20, 1995. Together, they have two children and one grandson.

His daughter Maricel (born 1992) hosts his programs Wanted sa Radyo and Idol in Action. His son Ralph Wendell (born 1996) is the incumbent representative of the 2nd district of Quezon City since 2022.

Julieta Nacpil Licup claimed that she and Tulfo married on October 25, 1982, at a civil wedding in Capas, Tarlac with supporting evidence and they have one daughter named Grendy, born in 1984. Julieta claimed that Tulfo left her when she was five months pregnant with their child because of a misunderstanding. Because they were not able to communicate with each other thereafter in 1984, Julieta thought that Tulfo was dead and filed paperwork within the Philippine courts with evidence of her attempts at finding him.

The courts approved her petition to his presumptive death and she was able to remarry an American in 1992. As a result, Tulfo was sued for bigamy on June 10, 2019, as their marriage was not annulled. She claimed that Tulfo married another woman named Celedonia Amos in the United States in 1985. He faced a disqualification case before Commission on Elections given those claims of his past marriages, but was later junked by the Commission's 2nd division because it "does not pertain to his qualification for elective office."

== Electoral history ==
Electoral history of Raffy Tulfo
Year	Office	Party	Votes received				Result
Year	Office	Party	Total	%	P.	Swing	Result
2022	Senator of the Philippines	Independent	23,396,954	42.12%	3rd	—N/a	Won

== Filmography ==
=== Television ===
Year	Title	Role
1993–2006	Isumbong Mo Kay Tulfo	Host
1995–98	Pangunahing Balita Ala-Una	News Anchor
1997–2002	Philippines' Most Wanted	Host
1998–2001	Pambansang Balita Ala-Una	News anchor
1997–2004	Balitang Balita	News anchor
2002–03	Task Force Siyasat	Host
2003–05	Problema Mo, Sagot Ko!	Host
2004–06	Sentro	News anchor
2005–06	Kamao Reloaded	Host
2006	Isumbong Mo! (Tulfo Brothers)	Host
2010	Oplan Zero Tambay	Host
2010–12	Balitaang Tapat	News Anchor
2011	Wanted	Host
2011–16	T3: Alliance	Host
2013–14	Aksyon Weekend	News anchor
2014–20	Aksyon sa Tanghali	News Anchor
2017	Amo	Host
2019	#TolWagTroll Respeto Lang	Host
2019–20	One Balita Pilipinas	News Anchor
2020–21	Idol in Action	Host
2020–21	Frontline Pilipinas	Anchor
2021	Wanted: Ang Serye	Host
2024–present	Kapatid Mo, Idol Raffy Tulfo	Host

=== Radio ===
Year	Title	Role
1994–2011	Wanted sa Radyo	Host
2011–24	Wanted sa Radyo	Host
2024—present	Wanted sa Radyo	Host

== Notes ==
Political offices
Senate of the Philippines
Preceded by Imee Marcos	Chair of the Philippine Senate; Labor, Employment and Human Resources Development Committee; 2025–present	Incumbent
Preceded by Grace Poe	Chair of the Philippine Senate; Public Services Committee; 2024–present	Incumbent
Preceded by Win Gatchalian	Chair of the Philippine Senate; Energy Committee; 2022–2024	Succeeded by Pia Cayetano
