= Philippine Senate Committee on Women, Children, Family Relations and Gender Equality =

Standing committee of the Senate of the Philippines

Committee on Women, Children, Family Relations and Gender Equality
- Senate of the Philippines; 20th Congress

History
- New session started: July 28, 2025

Leadership
- Chair: Risa Hontiveros (Akbayan) since August 5, 2016

Structure
- Seats: 11
- Political groups: Majority (7): Nacionalista (2); NPC (2); Akbayan (1); KANP (1); Liberal (1); Minority (4): Independent (2); Nacionalista (1); PDP (1)

The Philippine Senate Committee on Women, Children, Family Relations and Gender Equality is a standing committee of the Senate of the Philippines.

== History ==
The Senate had a Committee on Youth, Women and Family Relations until September 2, 2013, when it was split into the Committee on Youth and the Committee on Women, Family Relations and Gender Equality. The latter committee's creation also led to the addition of gender equality in the list of matters under its jurisdiction.

The committee got its current name after its jurisdiction was again expanded on August 3, 2015, to include matters relating to the welfare and protection of children.

== Jurisdiction ==
According to the Rules of the Senate, the committee handles all matters relating to:

- Women
- Welfare and protection of children
- Family relations
- Equality before the law of women and men

== House Counterparts ==
The jurisdiction of the Senate Committee on Women, Children, Family Relations and Gender Equality has counterparts in the House of Representatives:

- House Committee on Population and Family Relations
- House Committee on Welfare of Children
- House Committee on Women and Gender Equality

== Members, 20th Congress ==
Based on the Rules of the Senate, the Senate Committee on Women, Children, Family Relations and Gender Equality has 11 members.

Position	Member	Party
Chairperson	Risa Hontiveros (Note: Also serving as the deputy majority leader alongside JV Ejercito (NPC).)	Akbayan
Vice Chairperson	Pia Cayetano	Nacionalista
Deputy Majority Leader	JV Ejercito	NPC
Members for the Majority	Bam Aquino	KANP
Members for the Majority	Loren Legarda	NPC
Members for the Majority	Kiko Pangilinan	Liberal
Members for the Majority	Camille Villar	Nacionalista
Deputy Minority Leaders	Joel Villanueva	Independent
Deputy Minority Leaders	Rodante Marcoleta	Independent
Members for the Minority	Bong Go	PDP
Members for the Minority	Imee Marcos	Nacionalista

Ex officio members:

- Senate President pro tempore Tito Sotto
- Majority Floor Leader Juan Miguel Zubiri
- Minority Floor Leader Alan Peter Cayetano

Committee secretary: Gemma Genoveva G. Tanpiengco

== Historical membership rosters ==
=== 19th Congress ===
Position	Member	Party
Chairperson	Risa Hontiveros	Akbayan
Vice Chairperson	Nancy Binay	UNA
Members for the Majority	Pia Cayetano	Nacionalista
Members for the Majority	Cynthia Villar	Nacionalista
Members for the Majority	Grace Poe	Independent
Members for the Majority	Imee Marcos	Nacionalista
Members for the Majority	Robin Padilla	PDP
Members for the Majority	Raffy Tulfo	Independent
Members for the Majority	Bong Go	PDP
Members for the Majority	JV Ejercito	NPC
Members for the Majority	Mark Villar	Nacionalista
Member for the Minority	None	

Committee secretary: Gemma Genoveva G. Tanpiengco

== See also ==
- List of Philippine Senate committees
