= Philippine Senate Committee on Trade, Commerce and Entrepreneurship =

Standing committee of the Senate of the Philippines

Committee on Trade, Commerce and Entrepreneurship
- Senate of the Philippines; 20th Congress

History
- New session started: July 28, 2025

Leadership
- Chair: Bam Aquino (KNP) since June 17, 2026

Structure
- Seats: 11
- Political groups: Majority (7): NPC (3); Nacionalista (2); Akbayan (1); Liberal (1); Minority (4): PDP (1); Nacionalista (1); Independent (2)

The Philippine Senate Committee on Trade, Commerce and Entrepreneurship is a standing committee of the Senate of the Philippines.

== Jurisdiction ==
According to the Rules of the Senate, the committee handles all matters relating to:

- Domestic and foreign trade and private corporations
- Micro, small and medium enterprises (MSMEs)
- Social enterprises
- Promotion of entrepreneurship and the regulation of entrepreneurial practice
- Patents, copyrights, trade names and trademarks
- Standards, weights, measures and designs
- Quality control, control and stabilization of prices of commodities
- Consumer protection
- Handicrafts and cottage industries
- Marketing of commodities
- The Department of Trade and Industry
- The Optical Media Board
- The Intellectual Property Office of the Philippines
- The Securities and Exchange Commission
- The Office of the Presidential Adviser on Investment and Economic Affairs

== Members, 20th Congress ==
Based on the Rules of the Senate, the Senate Committee on Trade, Commerce and Entrepreneurship has 11 members.

Position	Member	Party
Chairperson	Rodante Marcoleta (Note: Also serving as the deputy minority leader alongside Joel Villanueva (Independent).)	Independent
Vice Chairperson	Vacant	
Deputy Majority Leaders	JV Ejercito	NPC
Deputy Majority Leaders	Risa Hontiveros	Akbayan
Members for the Majority	Pia Cayetano	Nacionalista
Members for the Majority	Win Gatchalian	NPC
Members for the Majority	Loren Legarda	NPC
Members for the Majority	Kiko Pangilinan	Liberal
Members for the Majority	Mark Villar	Nacionalista
Deputy Minority Leader	Joel Villanueva	Independent
Members for the Minority	Bong Go	PDP
Members for the Minority	Imee Marcos	Nacionalista

Ex officio members:

- Senate President pro tempore Tito Sotto
- Majority Floor Leader Juan Miguel Zubiri
- Minority Floor Leader Alan Peter Cayetano

Committee secretary: Sherwynne B. Agub

== Historical membership rosters ==
=== 18th Congress ===
Position	Member	Party
Chairperson	Koko Pimentel	PDP–Laban
Vice Chairpersons	Win Gatchalian	NPC
Vice Chairpersons	Grace Poe	Independent
Members for the Majority	Richard Gordon	Independent
Members for the Majority	Cynthia Villar	Nacionalista
Members for the Majority	Sonny Angara	LDP
Members for the Majority	Nancy Binay	UNA
Members for the Minority	Francis Pangilinan	Liberal
Members for the Minority	Leila de Lima	Liberal

Committee secretary: Jingle Concon-Allam

== See also ==
- List of Philippine Senate committees
