= Bam Aquino =

Senator of the Philippines since 2025 and television personality (born 1977)

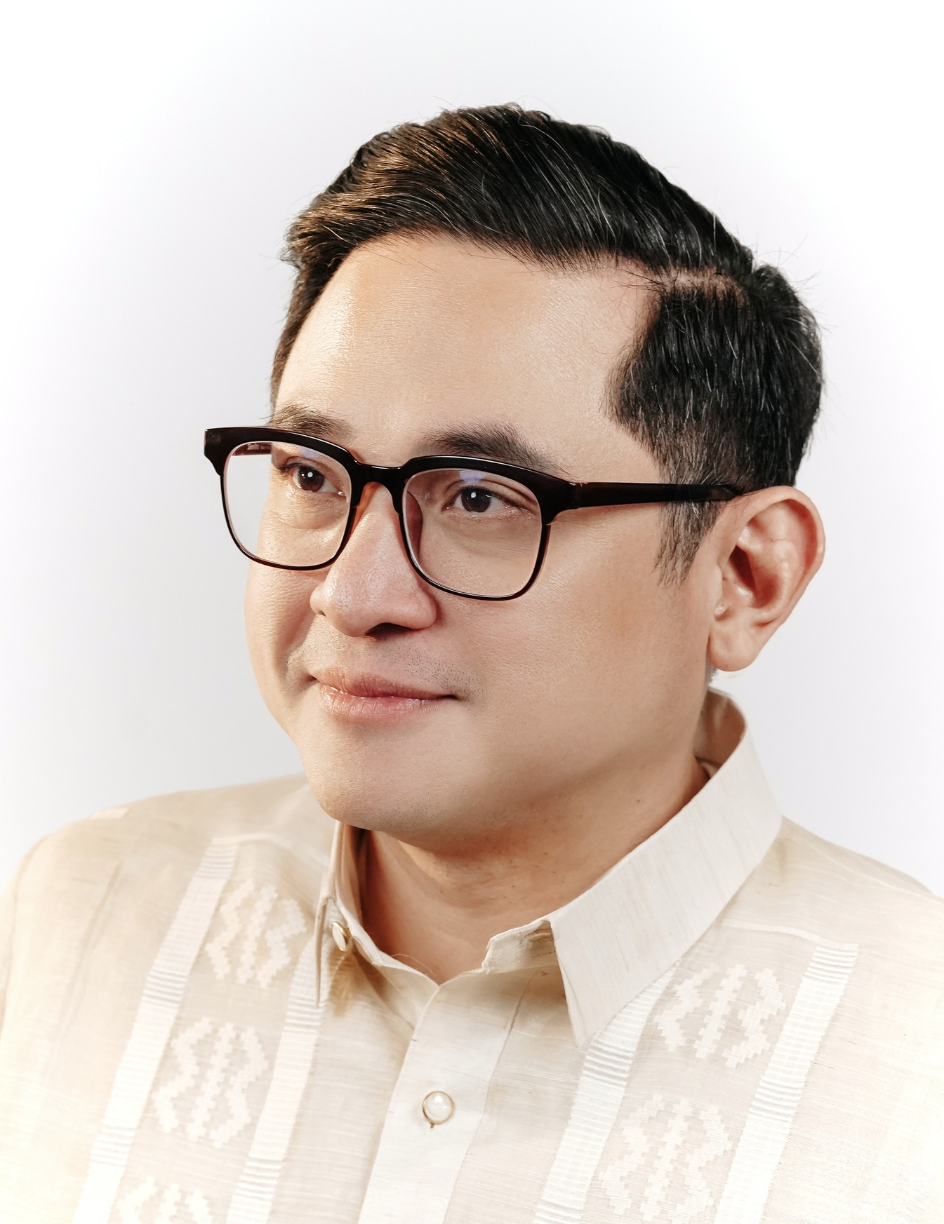
- Portrait, 2025

Senator of the Philippines
- Incumbent
- Assumed office June 30, 2025
- In office June 30, 2013 – June 30, 2019
Committee positions
Chair of the Senate Science and Technology Committee
Incumbent
Assumed office June 17, 2026
Preceded by	Himself
In office August 4, 2025 – May 11, 2026
Preceded by	Alan Peter Cayetano
Succeeded by	Himself
In office July 25, 2016 – June 30, 2019
Preceded by	Ralph Recto
Succeeded by	Nancy Binay
Chair of the Senate Basic Education Committee
Incumbent
Assumed office June 3, 2026
Preceded by	Loren Legarda
In office July 28, 2025 – May 11, 2026
Preceded by	Win Gatchalian
Succeeded by	Loren Legarda
Chair of the Senate Basic Education, Arts and Culture Committee
In office July 25, 2016 – February 27, 2017
Preceded by	Pia Cayetano
Succeeded by	Francis Escudero
Chair of the Senate Trade, Commerce, and Entrepreneurship Committee
Incumbent
Assumed office June 17, 2026
Preceded by	Rodante Marcoleta
In office July 22, 2013 – June 30, 2016
Preceded by	Manny Villar
Succeeded by	Migz Zubiri (as Chair of the Senate Trade, Commerce, and Entrepreneurship Committee)

Deputy Senate Minority Leader
- In office February 27, 2017 – June 30, 2019
- Leader: Franklin Drilon
- Preceded by: Position established
- Succeeded by: Risa Hontiveros

Chairman of the National Youth Commission
- In office 2003 – February 26, 2006
- President: Gloria Macapagal Arroyo
- Preceded by: Mabel Villarica Mamba
- Succeeded by: Richard Alvin Nalupta

Commissioner of the National Youth Commission
- In office 2001–2003

Chairperson of the Katipunan ng Nagkakaisang Pilipino
- Incumbent
- Assumed office May 14, 2024

Personal details
- Born: Paolo Benigno Aguirre Aquino IV; May 7, 1977 (age 49) Manila, Philippines
- Party: KANP (2024–present)
- Other political affiliations: Liberal (2012–2024)
- Spouse: Timi Gomez (m. 2012)
- Children: 2
- Relatives: Aquino family
- Education: Ateneo de Manila University (BS)
- Occupation: Politician; entrepreneur; media personality
- Website: bamaquino.com

Paolo Benigno "Bam" Aguirre Aquino IV ([bɛˈnigno ʔaˈɡirɛ ʔaˈkino], born May 7, 1977) is a Filipino politician and media personality who has served as a senator of the Philippines since 2025. A member of the Katipunan ng Nagkakaisang Pilipino (KANP), he previously served as a senator from 2013 to 2019 and as deputy Senate minority leader from 2017 to 2019.

Born into the prominent Aquino family, he graduated as valedictorian from the Ateneo de Manila University in 1999. Aquino served as chairman of the National Youth Commission from 2003 to 2006 under President Gloria Macapagal Arroyo. He participated in various documentaries and films and was president of the social enterprise MicroVentures, Inc.

Aquino was elected senator in 2013 under Team PNoy, chairing the Committee on Trade, Commerce, and Entrepreneurship, and the Committee on Youth (2013–2016), and later the Committee on Science and Technology (2016–2019). He was the principal sponsor of the Universal Access to Quality Tertiary Education Act. Aquino unsuccessfully sought re-election in 2019 under Otso Diretso, whose entire slate lost. He initially planned another run in 2022 but instead managed Leni Robredo's presidential campaign. Aquino ran again for senator in 2025 under the KiBam coalition. He garnered the second-most votes in the election, at around 21 million, and was elected to a second non-consecutive term.

== Early life and education ==
Bam Aquino was born on May 7, 1977, in Manila. He is the youngest of three sons of Paul Aquino, one of the co-founders of the Laban ng Demokratikong Pilipino and a native of Concepcion, Tarlac, and Melanie Aguirre of Davao. His grandfather, Benigno Aquino Sr., served as a senator from the third district (1928–34) and as the sixth Speaker of the House of Representatives of the Philippines (1943–44). His uncle, Benigno "Ninoy" Aquino Jr., was a former senator (1967–1972) who was exiled in the United States from 1980 until his assassination upon returning to the Philippines in 1983. Following the 1986 People Power Revolution, Ferdinand Marcos was deposed and Corazon Aquino, Ninoy's widow, became the first female president of the Philippines. His cousin, Benigno Aquino III, was elected the 15th President of the Philippines and served from 2010 to 2016.

Nicknamed "Bambam", Aquino began visiting his uncle Ninoy in prison at a young age and was exposed early to political activism. He gave his first public speech at the age of six in a rally in Biñan, Laguna, in December 1983, and later joined his family in attending numerous protest events around the country in the years leading up to the People Power Revolution. Aquino has cited these experiences as formative, shaping his early interest in civic engagement and public service.

He attended the Ateneo de Manila Grade School from 1983 to 1991 and the Ateneo High School from 1991 to 1995, graduating as valedictorian from both institutions. In the 1980s, Aquino was a mainstay of the New Children's Hour television program on ABS-CBN. In school, he was involved in extracurricular activities such as the Cub Scouts, a media club, the Dulaang Sibol theater group, and catechism outreach in underprivileged communities. From 1995 to 1999, he completed his Bachelor of Science in Management Engineering at the Ateneo de Manila University, graduating summa cum laude and as class valedictorian. During his university years, he served as president of the student council. He later attended the Ateneo de Manila Law School from 2000 to 2001, and completed the Executive Education Program on Public Policy and Leadership at the Harvard Kennedy School in the United States in December 2008.

Aquino has often cited the values of non-violence and democracy as key influences inherited from his uncle Ninoy.

== National Youth Commission (2001–2006) ==
Aquino was appointed to the National Youth Commission (NYC) in 2001, shortly after the Second EDSA Revolution that ousted President Joseph Estrada. Initially serving as a Commissioner-at-Large (2001–2003), he was involved in advising on youth policies, coordinating youth programs across agencies, and representing youth interests at the national level. In February 2003, at age 25, he became the Chairman and CEO of the NYC – reportedly the youngest head of a Philippine government agency at that time. As Chairman (2003–2006) under President Gloria Macapagal Arroyo, Aquino oversaw the commission's operations and nationwide initiatives. He was later succeeded by Richard Alvin Nalupta as NYC Chair in 2006.

During Aquino's NYC tenure, he led or launched several major programs focusing on youth empowerment and development. In 2002, the NYC—in partnership with Senator Kiko Pangilinan's office—established the Ten Accomplished Youth Organizations (TAYO) Awards, an annual national program recognizing outstanding youth groups across the country. The TAYO Awards became a flagship initiative of the commission, encouraging youth volunteerism and innovation by highlighting successful youth-led projects. Aquino's term also prioritized strategic planning for youth development: the NYC under his leadership spearheaded the formulation of the Medium-Term Youth Development Plan 2005–2010, a comprehensive framework aligning youth programs with the national development agenda. The plan was crafted through research and consultations on the state of Filipino youth and identified key priorities such as education, employment, health, values formation, and civic participation. To support this, experts from academia and various stakeholders were engaged, and the resulting plan was later adopted by the government as a guiding blueprint for youth policy.

Aquino also represented the Philippines in regional youth affairs. In August 2003, he served as chairman of the Fourth ASEAN Ministerial Meeting on Youth held in Manila, a gathering of Southeast Asian ministers focused on youth employment and cooperation. Under his chairmanship, the conference produced the "Manila Declaration" on strengthening youth participation in sustainable employment across ASEAN. Domestically, Aquino took part in advocacy efforts beyond the NYC's formal programs – for instance, he was the spokesperson for The Children's Hour campaign from 2002 to 2004, a private-sector initiative that raised resources for children's welfare.

As the Arroyo administration faced credibility challenges in the mid-2000s, Aquino resigned as Chairman of the NYC on February 26, 2006, a move he later explained was prompted by a sense of disillusionment with the Arroyo government following a series of scandals. His departure came just months after the "Hyatt 10" incident, when several senior officials resigned in mid-2005 following the Hello Garci scandal. Aquino stated that he felt the administration had "betrayed" the youth, and, being idealistic about public service, he chose to "end [his] term" early in protest. While political opponents during his 2013 Senate run tried to cast his NYC service under Arroyo as a liability, Aquino defended his record, expressing pride in what the commission accomplished for Filipino youth.

== Early private career; media career ==
From 2002 to May 2013, he was a board member for the Venture for Fundraising. From March 2004 to 2006, he was an ambassador for the Haribon Foundation. Since February 2006, he has been a member of Asia Society's Asia 21 Young Leaders Forum held in Hong Kong. In 2006, Aquino co-founded the social enterprise MicroVentures, Inc., and served as its president from June 2007 to May 2013. During his tenure, he led the development of the Hapinoy Program, an initiative aimed at empowering women micro-entrepreneurs in rural areas through micro-financing, training, and access to new business opportunities. The program gained international recognition, including the United Nations Project Inspire Grand Prize in 2011. Aquino's leadership at MicroVentures concluded when he transitioned into his role as a senator in mid-2013. From September 2007 to May 2013, he was a board member for Rags2Riches and the Coca-Cola Foundation. From March 2006 to May 2013, he was the president of the TAYO Foundation.

In 2001, Aquino was one of the hosts of the talk show Breakfast on Studio 23. In 2006, Aquino hosted the youth-oriented debate show Y Speak, also on Studio 23. He also hosted ANC's business magazine show Start-Up in 2008. In 2009, Aquino played the role of his uncle Ninoy Aquino in the documentary film The Last Journey of Ninoy. The film premiered on August 21, 2009, the 26th anniversary of the assassination of Ninoy. In 2012, Aquino hosted the business show SME Go! Powered by Go Negosyo on GMA News TV.

== Senate (2013–2019) ==
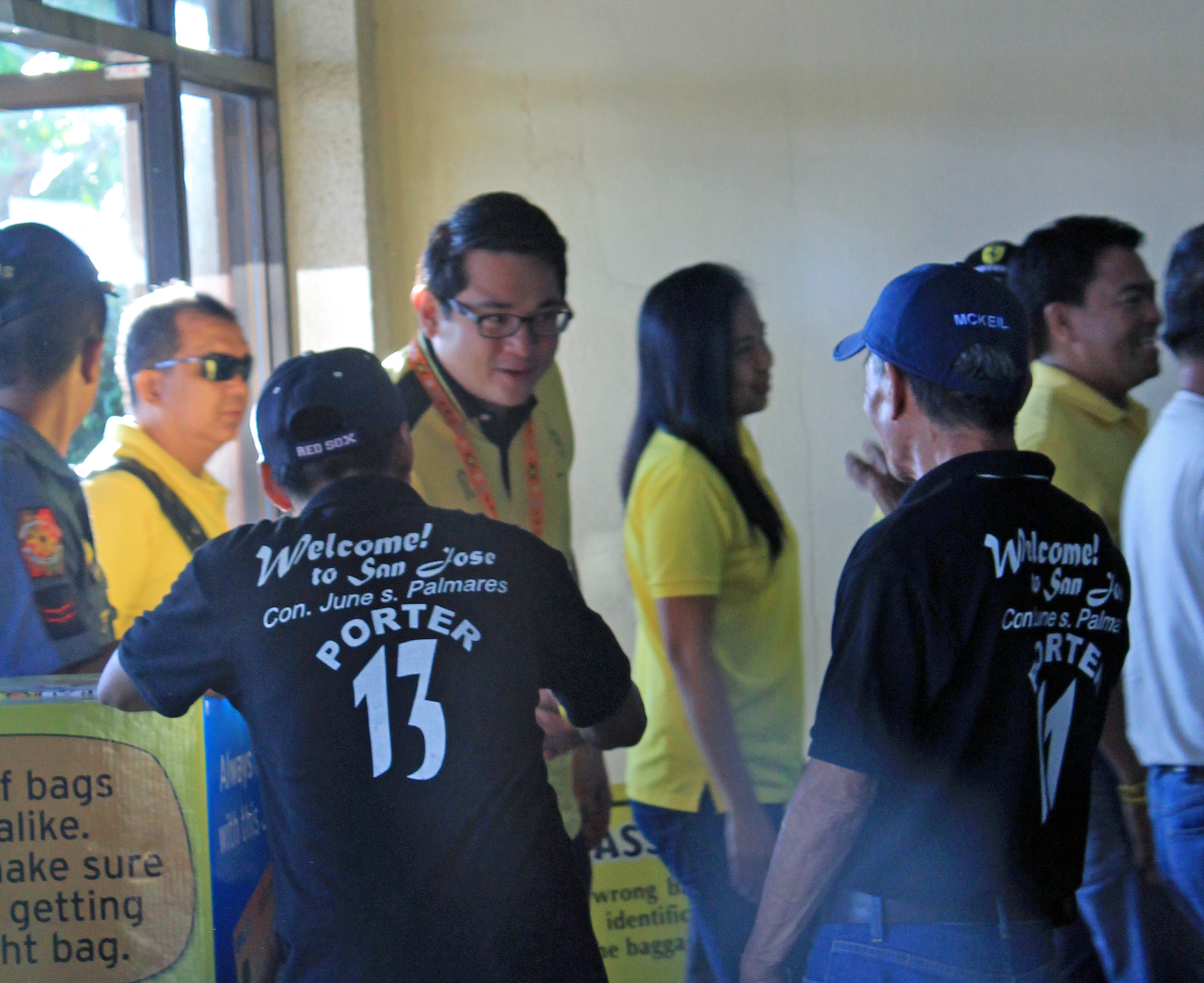
Aquino during his 2013 senatorial campaign under Team PNoy

=== Elections ===
==== 2013 ====
Aquino entered the 2013 senatorial race as a political newcomer at age 35 – the youngest candidate on President Benigno Aquino III's administration slate. A cousin of the President and a former youth commissioner and social entrepreneur, Aquino cited both personal and societal motivations for running. He said he wanted to "give the youth a voice in the Senate" as a "fresh face" they could relate to. He told Philippine Daily Inquirer editors and reporters that the primary issue then was "finding jobs for young people" and that he could "help push for these issues further and make these part of the national discussion" by joining the Senate. Tony Meloto, the founder of the non-governmental organization Gawad Kalinga, and Senator Kiko Pangilinan convinced Aquino to run. Aquino's campaign platform centered on poverty reduction and youth empowerment, aligning with the Aquino administration's "inclusive growth" agenda. Aquino campaigned for better access to education, job creation, and support for small businesses and entrepreneurs – themes informed by his social entrepreneurship background.

Aquino filed his certificate of candidacy for senator on October 5, 2012. He ran under the banner of the Liberal Party-led administration coalition, popularly dubbed Team PNoy. Senior Liberal Party figures like Senator Pangilinan endorsed Aquino, even referring to the move as "passing the baton" to a new generation. Pangilinan cast Aquino's candidacy as a continuation of the People Power Revolution legacy of his late aunt (President Corazon Aquino) and uncle (Senator Ninoy Aquino), saying it would bring "people power to the next level" in governance. Pangilinan described Bam Aquino as a youthful reformist who would "breathe fresh life" into the Senate and continue the Aquino government's good governance initiatives. For his part, Bam Aquino pledged to champion the youth and justice in the Senate, hoping to emulate Pangilinan's independent, reform-oriented stance. He supported the Reproductive Health Law, a sin tax law, and the improvement of the Pantawid Pamilyang Pilipino Program (4Ps). During the campaign, Aquino joined Team PNoy's provincial sorties and media fora, often highlighting his technocratic background. He positioned himself as a clean, competent public servant who could help institutionalize his cousin's anti-corruption and anti-poverty programs. Aquino's lack of prior elective office and his prominent surname drew public attention; while critics saw another political dynasty entrant, supporters argued he was "young but qualified," citing his record in the youth commission and social enterprises as evidence of public service experience.

The May 2013 midterm elections proved successful for Bam Aquino. Team PNoy won 9 of the 12 Senate seats at stake. Aquino secured a seat by finishing in 7th place nationally with roughly 15 million votes. At 36 years old, he became the youngest member of the 16th Congress. Upon proclamation on May 17, 2013, Aquino framed his win as a mandate for inclusive growth and vowed to work on laws expanding opportunities for families and youth.

==== 2019 ====
In 2019, Aquino ran for a second Senate term under a changed political landscape, with the administration of President Rodrigo Duterte succeeding that of President Benigno Aquino III. As a member of the opposition, he filed his candidacy in October 2018, focusing his campaign on alleviating the high cost of living, job generation, and continuing social programs. He campaigned against Duterte's tax reform program, specifically calling for the suspension of excise taxes on fuel under the TRAIN Law to curb rising inflation. Economists had attributed the 2018 surge in consumer prices to the TRAIN tax on fuel, and Aquino positioned himself as one of the few legislators who had opposed the tax from the start.

Aquino ran under the "Otso Diretso" coalition, a slate of eight senatorial candidates mostly from the Liberal Party and aligned groups. Unlike in 2013, when he was aligned with the incumbent administration, Aquino ran in 2019 as part of the opposition, campaigning against the backdrop of President Rodrigo Duterte's high approval ratings. As the lone incumbent senator on the Otso Diretso ticket, political scientists saw Aquino as the opposition's most prominent contender. The slate campaigned on a platform of upholding democracy, checking alleged human rights abuses, and offering policy alternatives. Their campaign manager, Senator Francis Pangilinan, described their campaign as an "uphill battle" against Duterte's well-funded allies. Acknowledging their resource gap, the opposition adopted grassroots strategies: the Liberal Party launched "Project Makinig" (lit. transl. "Project Listen"), a door-to-door campaign in late 2018 to reconnect with voters at the barangay level. Aquino and his Otso Diretso colleagues also held town hall meetings in an effort to shore up support without the benefit of massive advertising funds or the endorsements of local government officials. They openly challenged administration-backed candidates to public debates. However, Duterte's allied slate (fielded by the ruling PDP–Laban and the President's daughter's Hugpong ng Pagbabago) largely ignored calls for debate, with Malacañang Palace saying that Otso Diretso wanted to debate "because it would give them publicity." Dr. Diana J. Mendoza, then-chair of the political science department at the Ateneo de Manila University, believed this limited Otso Diretso's visibility and made it harder for Aquino to contrast himself with rivals in the eyes of many voters. During the campaign, Aquino relied on volunteers and youth groups from his 2013 electoral campaign network, and he toured vote-rich provinces advocating for lower prices and continuing social welfare laws. Despite these efforts, Pulse Asia and Social Weather Stations (SWS) surveys showed him hovering near the cutoff of the "Magic 12" (the top 12 candidates win Senate seats). In the final stretch, Aquino was the only opposition bet within striking distance of victory, consistently polling around 12th–14th place while his slate-mates lagged further behind.

The midterm elections on May 13, 2019, resulted in a sweep for the pro-Duterte slate, and Aquino ultimately failed to secure re-election. He finished 14th place with about 14.1 million votes, two places short of the Senate winning circle. On May 15, 2019, Aquino conceded the election, remarking, "There are 14 million people who voted for an Aquino during the time of Duterte. That's something." None of the opposition's Otso Diretso candidates won a seat.

=== Tenure ===
Throughout his first Senate term, Aquino's public statements and policy positions often centered on inclusive growth, youth empowerment, and social welfare. As a freshman senator allied with the Aquino administration, he emphasized job creation through entrepreneurship and fought for youth representation in governance. Later, as part of the opposition under President Rodrigo Duterte, Aquino used his committee leadership to scrutinize government policies on education, science, and the economy. He was vocal in questioning steep rises in consumer prices and urged the suspension of fuel taxes under the TRAIN Law, aligning with his broader stance of "not burdening Filipino families" with onerous taxes and costs.

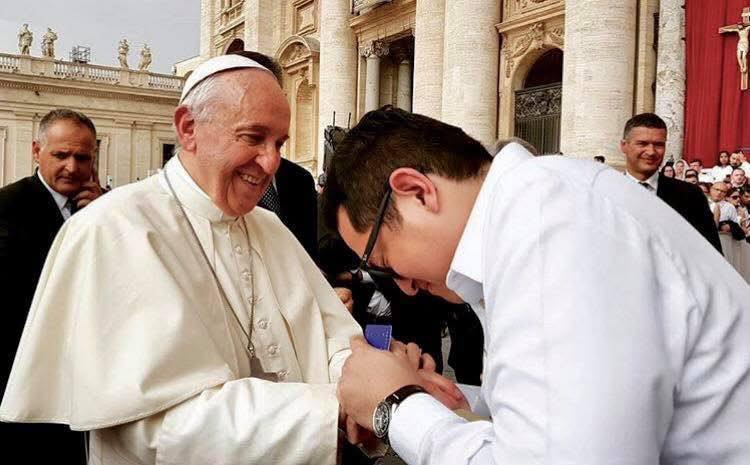
Aquino (right) meets Pope Francis (left) at St. Peter's Square, Vatican City, on August 23, 2018.

In the 16th Congress (2013–2016), Aquino chaired the Senate Committee on Trade, Commerce and Entrepreneurship, focusing on support for micro, small and medium enterprises (MSMEs). Aquino's first Republic Act (RA) that he principally sponsored was the Go Negosyo Act (lit. transl. Go Business Act; RA No. 10644, enacted 2014), which established "Negosyo Centers" (lit. transl. "Business Centers") nationwide to assist entrepreneurs and boost small businesses. He also co-authored and sponsored the Philippine Competition Act of 2015 (RA No. 10667) – the country's first comprehensive anti-trust law – aimed at curbing monopolistic practices to lower prices. Concurrently, Aquino headed the Senate Committee on Youth, through which he helped craft the Sangguniang Kabataan (SK) Reform Act of 2015 (RA No. 10742) that overhauled the youth council system and introduced an anti-political-dynasty provision – a first in Philippine law.

In the 17th Congress (2016–2019), Aquino briefly served as chairman of the Senate Committee on Education from July 2016 until the Liberal Party's members, including Aquino, were ousted from the Senate majority in February 2017. As the education committee chair, he was an author and the principal sponsor of Senate Bill No. 1304, which later became the landmark Universal Access to Quality Tertiary Education Act of 2017 (RA No. 10931), providing for free tuition in state universities and colleges. Aquino led this bill through the Senate—defending it in debates and during the bicameral conference—until it was ratified by Congress and signed into law in August 2017. After moving to the minority bloc, Aquino became the chairman of the Senate Committee on Science and Technology. In this role, he was the principal author of the Balik Scientist Act (transl. Returning Scientist Act; RA No. 11035, enacted June 2018), which institutionalized the Department of Science and Technology's program incentivizing Filipino scientists to return from overseas by providing research grants, allowances, and other benefits. Aquino likewise sponsored the Innovative Startup Act of 2019 (RA No. 11337) to offer incentives and remove hurdles for start-up enterprises, and pushed for legislation to open the telecommunications sector to more competition (later the Open Access in Data Transmission Act) as part of efforts to improve internet services.

Aquino was also active in various anti-poverty and consumer protection initiatives during his Senate term. In 2016, he introduced Senate Bill No. 357, which later became the Zero Food Waste Act, to create a national food bank scheme that would channel unsold or excess food from restaurants and supermarkets to the poor rather than letting it go to waste. The bill sought to appoint the Department of Social Welfare and Development as a coordinator between food establishments and accredited food banks, alongside penalties for those who deliberately spoil food fit for consumption. Aquino later lamented that misinformation derailed this proposal, after online posts falsely claimed he wanted to feed "leftovers" to poor people. He additionally advocated tax reforms to benefit low-income Filipinos. On May 4, 2014, Aquino filed a bill to exempt individuals earning below ₱60,000 (about US$1,350) annually from personal income taxes, while adjusting tax brackets to make the system more progressive. Although this Marginal Income Earners tax exemption measure did not pass under the Aquino administration, its objective of relieving the poorest workers from income tax foreshadowed provisions later included in the 2017 tax reform law known as the TRAIN Law.

== Between terms (2019–2025) ==
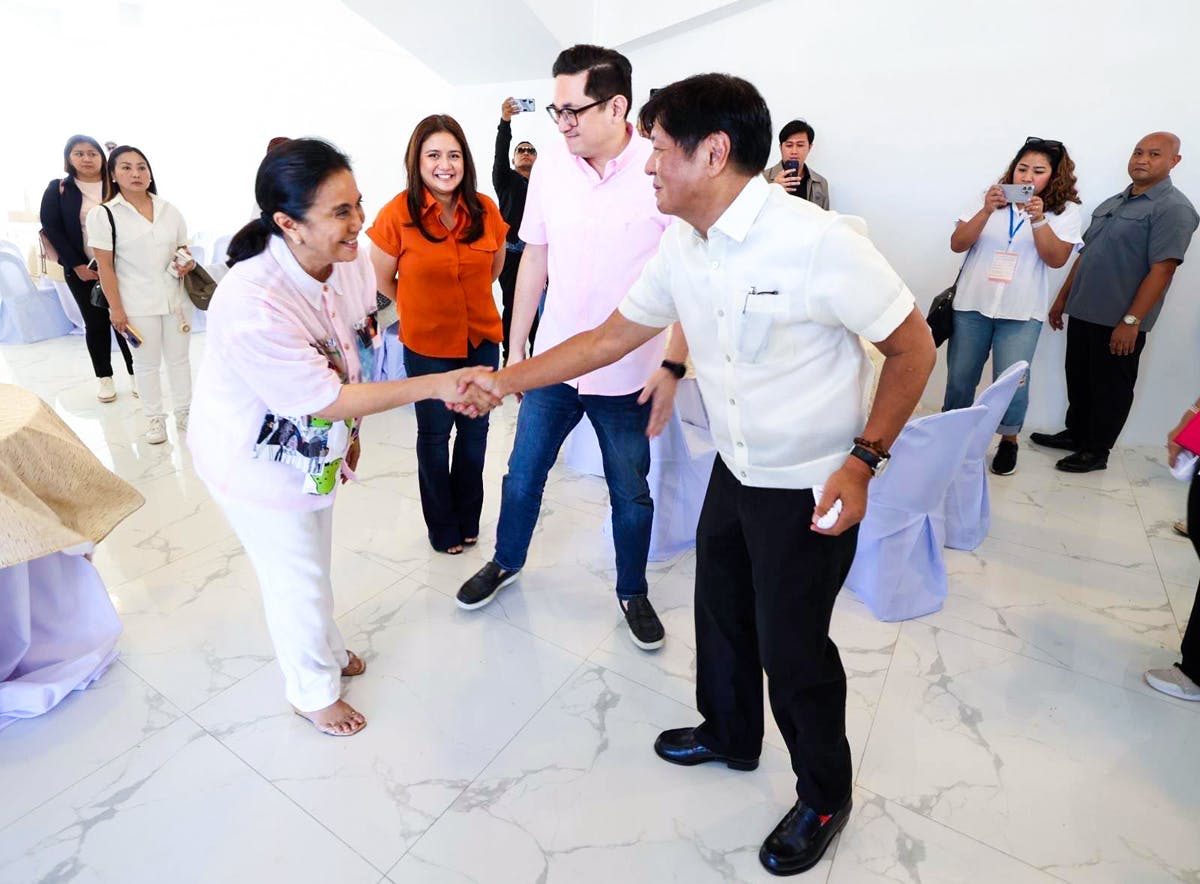
Aquino (center, in pink) with President Bongbong Marcos (right), former vice president Leni Robredo (left), and Congresswoman Camille Villar (behind Aquino, in orange), on October 17, 2024.

On July 19, 2019, the PNP–Criminal Investigation and Detection Group (CIDG) filed charges against Aquino and other members of the opposition for "sedition, cyber libel, libel, estafa, harboring a criminal, and obstruction of justice". On September 5, Aquino, along with Otso Diretso candidates Antonio Trillanes and Samira Gutoc, sought the dismissal of the charges. On February 10, 2020, he was cleared of all charges. On August 1, 2019, he was accused by Dennis Jose Borbon of using him to smear Senator Bong Go. He added that Aquino paid around ₱20,000–40,000 (US$400–800) a month for him to post anti-Duterte posts. Aquino denied the accusation.

=== Leni Robredo 2022 presidential campaign ===
Aquino initially planned to run for senator in the 2022 Philippine Senate election. However, on October 7, 2021, he revealed that Vice President Leni Robredo had offered him the role of campaign manager for her presidential campaign in the 2022 Philippine presidential election, which she launched earlier that day. Aquino accepted the offer instead to focus on "this essential and daunting challenge." Robredo would later go on to lose the presidential election to former senator Bongbong Marcos, as she placed second in the official results.

=== Post-2022 elections ===
In December 2022, Aquino gained controversy for proposing a wealth fund in 2016 similar to the Maharlika Wealth Fund, a controversial fund that allegedly was a "source of corruption". Aquino stated that his fund and the wealth fund are different.

Since 2024, Aquino has co-hosted the morning radio show Good Times with Mo Twister and Sam Oh on Magic 89.9. He had previously co-hosted the program during his first Senate term, from mid-2016 to March 2017.

== Senate (since 2025) ==
=== Election ===
==== 2025 ====
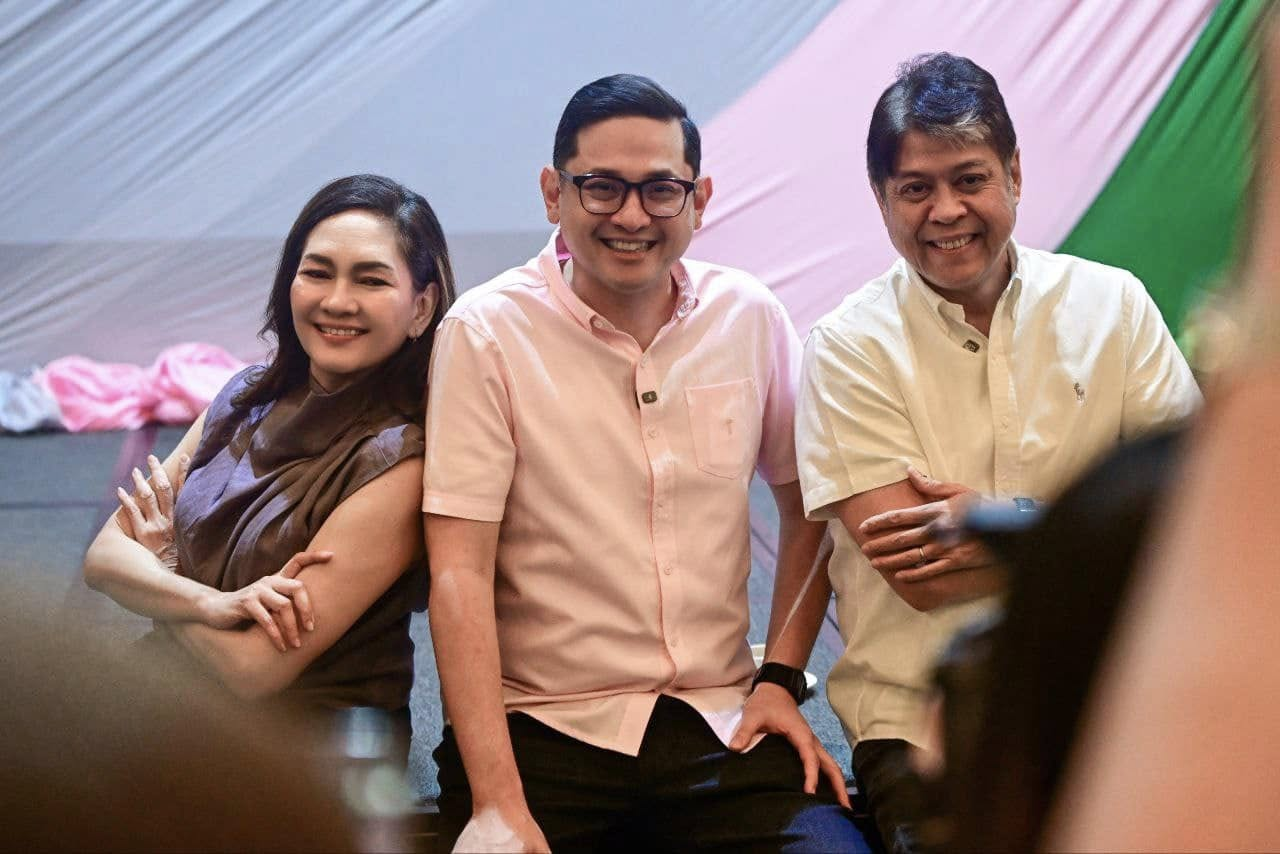
Campaign manager Risa Hontiveros (left) and the KiBam slate with Kiko Pangilinan (right) and Aquino (center)

In a television interview in 2024, Aquino announced he had already left the Liberal Party and had become chairman of the Katipunan ng Nagkakaisang Pilipino (KANP). In August 2024, he announced that he was going to run independently, but changed to KANP. He contested a Senate seat in the 2025 elections under the KiBam slate, alongside former senator Kiko Pangilinan, with whom Aquino had previously collaborated to establish the TAYO Awards in 2002.

In his run, Aquino centered his platform on improving access to education and ensuring job readiness for Filipino youth, particularly for K–12 graduates who do not proceed to college. Vowing to "fully implement" the Universal Access to Quality Tertiary Education Act that he authored, Aquino advocated for increased funding to expand access to tertiary education. He also proposes stronger coordination between educational institutions and local businesses to align skills training with labor market needs, thereby reducing job mismatches and increasing employment opportunities for senior high school graduates. His platform emphasizes a dual approach: guaranteeing access to college for those who choose it and securing employment pathways for those who enter the workforce directly after Grade 12.

During a one-on-one interview with ANC, Aquino reiterated his opposition to institutionalizing absolute divorce and stated his preference for making annulment more affordable and accessible.

Aquino won a second term in the Senate after placing second in the official results of the senatorial elections with 20,971,899 votes. Pangilinan also won, having placed fifth. They were proclaimed as senators-elect by the Commission on Elections on May 17, 2025. According to The Philippine Star, both Aquino and Pangilinan defied pre-election surveys consistently showing them outside the top 12 candidates.

=== Tenure ===
Before his tenure began, Aquino took his oath of office in his hometown of Concepcion, Tarlac, before Mayor Noel Villanueva on May 30. Upon taking office, Aquino filed ten education-related measures before the Senate. With education as a priority in his second term, he sought his former role as the chairperson of the Philippine Senate Committee on Basic Education, a role he would receive after joining the majority that reelected Francis Escudero as Senate president. In August 2025, he was named the chairperson of the Philippine Senate Committee on Science and Technology.

Following the election of Alan Peter Cayetano as Senate President on May 11, 2026, Aquino joined the minority bloc after voting for the unseated Senate President Tito Sotto. He also lost two committee chairmanships after all committee leadership positions were declared vacant due to the reorganization. He return as chairperson of Senate committee of Basic Education on June 3, 2026. He was elected as chairperson of the Trade, Commerce, and Entrepreneurship Committee and returned as chairperson of the Science and Technology Committee on June 17, 2026.

== Political positions ==
Political scientist Richard Heydarian identified Aquino as a progressive, center-left reformist in Philippine politics. Since entering the Senate in 2013 as a Liberal Party member, Aquino has consistently advocated liberal-democratic and pro-poor policies, focusing on social inclusion, good governance, and equitable development. He supports higher wages, entrepreneurship, and amending trade laws to protect local farmers. Aquino advocates for increased education funding, curriculum reform, and opposes mandatory ROTC without broader consultation. Aquino has pushed for anti-corruption and anti-dynasty measures, supports a firm stance against China's aggression while maintaining strong ties with allies, and was a vocal critic of former president Rodrigo Duterte's drug war and ICC withdrawal. On social issues, he supports the SOGIE Equality Bill and annulment reform, opposes the death penalty, and is open to medical marijuana pending further study. He backs climate resilience, humane transport modernization, and opposes charter change that removes term limits or weakens democratic safeguards.

== Personal life ==
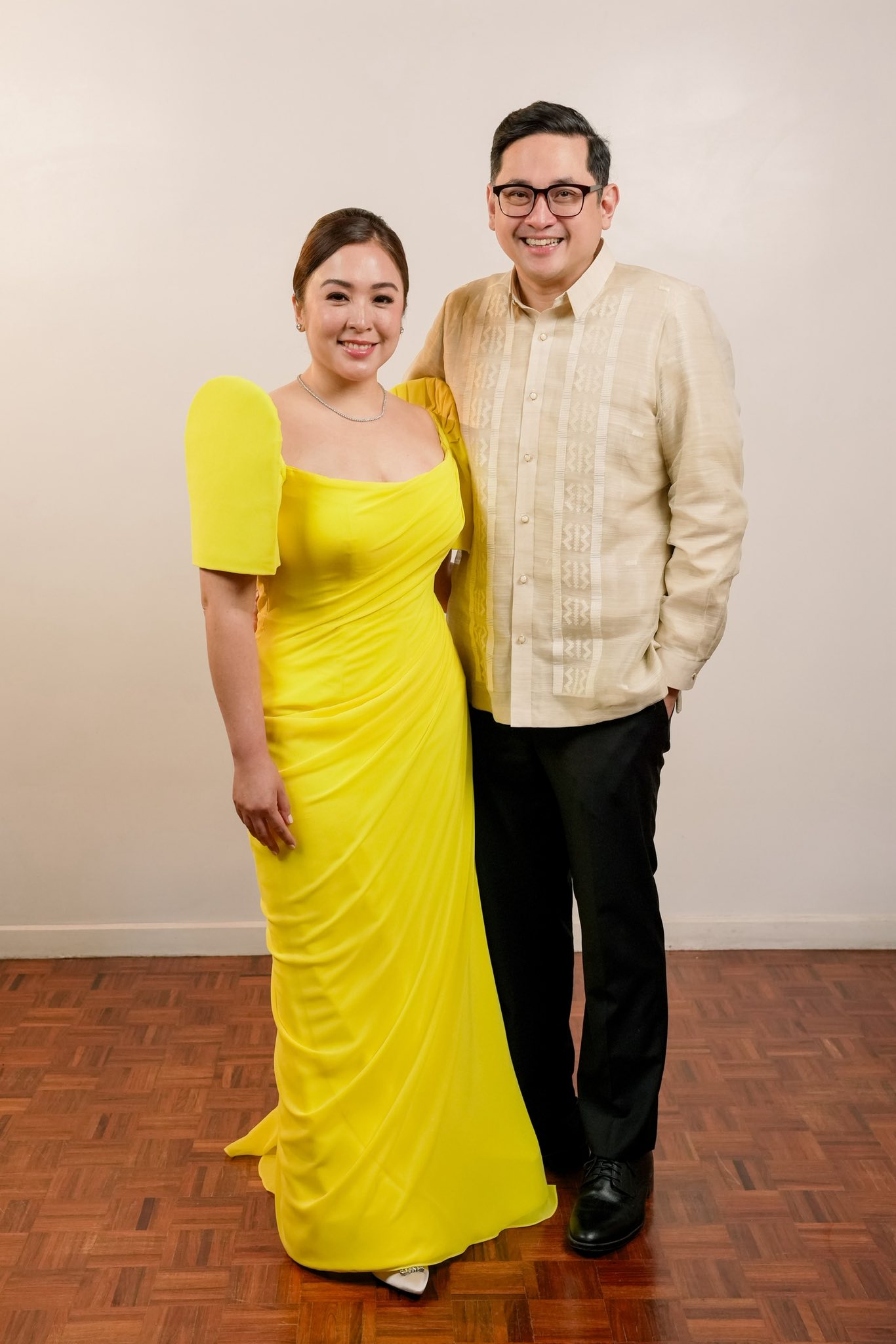
Aquino and his wife, Timi Gomez-Aquino in 2025

Aquino married Maria Fatima "Timi" Gomez on September 15, 2012 in a small wedding ceremony at a chapel in Tagaytay. The two met in 2004, when Aquino was chair of the National Youth Commission and Gomez was a delegate in the Ship for Southeast Asian Youth Program. They have two daughters.

Aquino is a gamer and is a fan of the Warcraft series. Throughout his Senate tenure, Aquino supported the video game industry in the Philippines. He also supported the recognition of Filipino gamers as national athletes, which the Games and Amusements Board eventually did in 2017. In 2015, he delivered the keynote address at the Electronic Sports and Gaming Summit at the SMX Convention Center Manila, an event attended by many video game developers and esports enthusiasts from across the country. He helped the TNC and Execration teams obtain U.S. visas to participate in The International 2016 and 2017, both of which were held in Seattle. Aquino helped establish the Philippine esports Association (PeSPA). In May 2023, Aquino established his gaming content platform known as BAM Gaming.

== Electoral history ==
Electoral history of Bam Aquino
Year	Office	Party	Votes received				Result
Year	Office	Party	Total	%	P.	Swing	Result
2013	Senator of the Philippines	Liberal	15,534,465	38.70%	7th	—N/a	Won
2019	Senator of the Philippines	Liberal	14,144,923	29.91%	14th	-8.79	Lost
2025	Senator of the Philippines	KANP	20,971,899	36.57%	2nd	+6.66	Won

== Awards ==
Aquino has received several awards and recognitions as a social entrepreneur and senator. Among his notable achievements include being part of the inaugural 2006 batch of Asia Society's Asia 21 Young Leaders, being named as one of the Ten Outstanding Young Men of the Philippines in the category of Social Enterprise and Community Development by Junior Chamber International (JCI) in 2010, being co-awarded the Social Entrepreneur of the Year by the Schwab Foundation for Social Entrepreneurship in 2011, being chosen as one of the Ten Outstanding Young Persons of the World by JCI in 2012, and was named as one Devex Manila's 40 Under 40 International Young Leaders in 2013.

Political offices
Preceded by Mabel Villarica Mamba	Chairman of the National Youth Commission; 2003–2006	Succeeded by Richard Alvin Nalupta
Party political offices
First	Chairperson of the KANP; 2024–present	Incumbent
