= Philippine Senate Committee on Science and Technology =

Standing committee of the Senate of the Philippines

Committee on Science and Technology
- Senate of the Philippines; 20th Congress

History
- New session started: July 28, 2025

Leadership
- Chair: Bam Aquino (KANP) since August 4, 2025

Structure
- Seats: 7
- Political groups: Majority (4): Akbayan (1); KANP (1); Nacionalista (1); NPC (1); Minority (3): PMP (1); Independent (2)

The Philippine Senate Committee on Science and Technology is a standing committee of the Senate of the Philippines.

== Jurisdiction ==
According to the Rules of the Senate, the committee handles all matters relating to science and technology, including scientific and technological research, development and advancement.

== Members, 20th Congress ==
Based on the Rules of the Senate, the Senate Committee on Science and Technology has 7 members.

| Position | Member | Party |
|---|---|---|
| Chairperson | Bam Aquino | KANP |
| Vice Chairperson | Pia Cayetano | Nacionalista |
| Members for the Majority | JV Ejercito | NPC |
| Members for the Majority | Risa Hontiveros | Akbayan |
| Members for the Minority | Rodante Marcoleta | Independent |
| Members for the Minority | Joel Villanueva | Independent |
| Members for the Minority | Jinggoy Estrada | PMP |

Ex officio members:

- Senate President pro tempore Panfilo Lacson
- Majority Floor Leader Juan Miguel Zubiri
- Minority Floor Leader Alan Peter Cayetano

Committee secretary: Theresa Marie N. Chan-See

== Historical membership rosters ==
=== 18th Congress ===
| Position | Member | Party |
|---|---|---|
| Chairperson | Nancy Binay | UNA |
| Vice Chairpersons | Win Gatchalian | NPC |
| Vice Chairpersons | Francis Tolentino | PDP–Laban |
| Members for the Majority | Cynthia Villar | Nacionalista |
| Members for the Majority | Koko Pimentel | PDP–Laban |
| Members for the Majority | Joel Villanueva | CIBAC |
| Member for the Minority | Leila de Lima | Liberal |

Committee secretary: Bernadine B. Mahinay

== See also ==
- List of Philippine Senate committees
