= Philippine Senate Committee on Youth =

Standing committee of the Senate of the Philippines

Committee on Youth
- Senate of the Philippines; 20th Congress

History
- New session started: July 28, 2025

Leadership
- Chair: Bong Go (PDP) since July 29, 2025

Structure
- Seats: 9
- Political groups: Majority (6): NPC (2); Akbayan (1); KANP (1); Nacionalista (1); Independent (1); Minority (3): Nacionalista (1); PDP (1); Independent (1)

The Philippine Senate Committee on Youth is a standing committee of the Senate of the Philippines.

This committee, along with the Committee on Women, Children, Family Relations and Gender Equality, was formed after the Committee on Youth, Women and Family Relations was split into two on September 2, 2013, pursuant to Senate Resolution No. 6 during the 16th Congress.

== Jurisdiction ==
According to the Rules of the Senate, the committee handles all matters relating to:

- The youth and its vital role in nation-building
- Promotion and protection of their physical, moral, spiritual, intellectual, and social well-being
- Inculcation of patriotism, nationalism and their involvement in public and civic affairs

== Members, 20th Congress ==
Based on the Rules of the Senate, the Senate Committee on Youth has 9 members.

Position	Member	Party
Chairperson	Bong Go	PDP
Vice Chairperson	Imee Marcos	Nacionalista
Deputy Majority Leaders	JV Ejercito	NPC
Deputy Majority Leaders	Risa Hontiveros	Akbayan
Members for the Majority	Bam Aquino	KANP
Members for the Majority	Loren Legarda	NPC
Members for the Majority	Raffy Tulfo	Independent
Members for the Majority	Mark Villar	Nacionalista
Deputy Minority Leader	Joel Villanueva	Independent

Ex officio members:

- Senate President pro tempore Tito Sotto
- Majority Floor Leader Juan Miguel Zubiri
- Minority Floor Leader Alan Peter Cayetano

Committee secretary: Avigail G. Andaya

== Historical membership rosters ==
=== 19th Congress ===
Position	Member	Party
Chairperson	Bong Go	PDP
Vice Chairperson	Nancy Binay	UNA
Members for the Majority	Robin Padilla	PDP
Members for the Majority	Migz Zubiri	Independent
Members for the Majority	Ronald dela Rosa	PDP
Members for the Majority	JV Ejercito	NPC
Members for the Majority	Mark Villar	Nacionalista
Members for the Majority	Imee Marcos	Nacionalista
Member for the Minority	Risa Hontiveros	Akbayan

Committee secretary: David T. Alegre III

== See also ==
- List of Philippine Senate committees
