= Patents in the Philippines =

Philippine Law

Republic Act No. 8293, otherwise known as The Intellectual Property Code of the Philippines lays down the rules and regulations that grant, and enforce patents in the Philippines. Patents may be granted to technical solutions such as an inventions, machines, devices, processes, or an improvement of any of the foregoing. The technical solution must be novel, innovative, and industrially useful. In order for a technical solution to be granted a patent, the inventor must file an application to the Bureau of Patents, which will examine, and in some cases, grant its approval. The law is designed as to foster domestic creativity, to attract foreign investors, and to motivate inventors to release their products for public access.

== Types of Patents ==
=== Invention ===
An invention must be a technical solution to issues in any field of human activity. It may come in may forms such as a product, a device, a machine, or a process. The invention must meet the following criteria in order to be considered as a patentable invention the solution:

- The solution must be new
- The solution must have an innovative step
- The solution must be industrially useful

Products, processes, or an improvement of the foregoing, may relate to the technical solution. However, not all technical solutions may be considered as patentable inventions (Part 2, Rule 202 of the Philippine Republic Act No. 8293). Examples of these are the following:

1. Aesthetic creations
2. Abstract Ideas
3. Discoveries, and other scientific theories
4. Methods of treatment for the animal body or human body
5. Animal breeds or plant varieties
6. Computer programs
7. Anything that is against public morality

=== Utility Model ===
Similar to a patent, a utility model is a technical solution to issues present in any field of human activity. Utility models must also meet the criteria needed for inventions to be patentable. Furthermore, Utility models must be of practical utility through its form, configuration or composition. Novel tools, and products are common examples of objects that can be considered as utility models. The provisions that regulate the type of patentable inventions are also the provisions used to regulate utility models (Part 2, Rule 202 of the Philippine Republic Act No. 8293).

=== Industrial Design ===
An industrial design gives a product or handicraft a distinct look. It may be 2-Dimensional (lines and colours), 3-Dimensional (shapes) or a combination of both. There are however industrial designs that are not patentable. Examples of these are the following:

1. Mere schemes or decorations that are not part of the product or handicraft
2. Designs that are only present to obtain technical results
3. Anything that is against public morality, order and health

== Philippine Law ==
Within the Philippines, multiple laws have been passed towards maintaining the integrity and order of patents. The main law in the Philippines is Republic Act No. 8293 or the "Intellectual Property Code of the Philippines", however there exists multiple amendments towards certain articles in this law. Listed below are the major Philippine Laws directed towards patents and patentability in the country:

=== Republic Act No. 8293 ===
Republic Act No. 8293 or the "Intellectual Property Code of the Philippines" is the primary law with regards to the copyright law of the Philippines as well as the establishment of the Intellectual Property Office of the Philippines. Republic Act No. 8293 is an amendment of the Revised Penal Code of the Philippines and was legislated in 1997. The Intellectual Property Code of the Philippines encompasses Copyright and Related Rights, Enforcement of IP and Related Laws, Geographical Indications, Industrial Designs, Industrial Property, IP Regulatory Body, Layout Designs of Integrated Circuits, Patents of Inventions, Trade Names, Trademarks, Transfer of Technology, Undisclosed Information (Trade Secrets), and Utility Models.

=== Major Amendments to Republic Act No. 8293 ===
==== Republic Act No. 9502 ====
Republic Act No. 9502 or the "Universally Accessible and Quality Medicines Act of 2008" is an act that aims to provide cheaper and better quality medicines to the Filipino people. It is an amendment of Republic Act No. 8293, or the "Intellectual Property Code of the Philippines", Republic Act No. 6675, or the "Generics Act of 1988", and Republic Act No. 5921, or the "Pharmacy Law". The aim of Republic Act No. 9502 is to protect public health and public interest on circumstances of extreme urgency by adopting appropriate measures to promote and ensure access to affordable quality drugs and medicines for all. The Universally Accessible and Quality Medicines Act of 2008 also ensures that the Philippine Government will be able to regulate the prices of drugs and medicines, in the event that there is no longer an effective competition in the supply and demand of quality affordable drugs and medicines.

==== Republic Act No. 10055 ====
Republic Act No. 10055, also known as the "Philippine Technology Transfer Act of 2009", is an act providing the framework and support system for the ownership, management and commercialization of the intellectual property generated from research and development funded by government and for other purposes. Republic Act No. 10055 was implemented in recognition of the fact that science, technology and innovation are essential for national development and progress. This act gives priority to research and development, invention, innovation and their utilization. It shall also encourage the widest and most systematic participation of all stakeholders in policy-making related to science and technology, and in the generation, transfer and utilization of intellectual property, especially for the benefit of the general public.

Due to this act, the Philippine Government shall facilitate the transfer and promote the utilization of intellectual property for the national benefit and shall call upon all research and development institutes and/or institutions that perform government-funded research and development to take on technology transfer as their strategic mission and to effectively translate results of government-funded R&D into useful products and services that will redound to the benefit of Filipinos, notwithstanding the income generated from intellectual property rights (IPRs) and technology transfer activities. This act also ensures on the proper management of intellectual property, development of capacity by RDIs to become self-sustaining and competitive, and on enhancing interaction and cooperation with the private sector, particularly small and medium enterprises through collaborative and contract research based on equitable, fair access, and mutual benefit for all involved partners. This is all to establish the means to ensure greater public access to technologies and knowledge generated from government-funded R&D while enabling, where appropriate, the management and protection of related intellectual property

==== Republic Act No. 10372 ====
Republic Act No. 10372, also entitled as "An Act Amending Certain Provisions of Republic Act No. 8293, otherwise known as the ‘Intellectual Property Code of the Philippines', and for other purposes." This act was approved on February 28, 2013 and is a comprehensive amendment of certain articles and sections in Republic Act No. 8293.

== International Law ==
The Philippines is an active participant in international trade. The country is a member of the international trade organizations such as the World Trade Organization and the World Intellectual Property Organization. The country subscribes to a number of multilateral, regional, and bilateral treaties that facilitate the process of trade between multiple nations as well as to observe and uphold Intellectual property rights. Some of the notable treaties that the country participates in are the following:

=== Multilateral ===
==== TRIPS Agreement ====
The TRIPS Agreement is a multilateral trade agreement mediated by the World Trade Organization that came into effect on 1 January 1995, on the same day the Philippines became a member of the WTO. It was borne out of the desire of the member states to "reduce distortions and impediments to international trade, taking into account the need to promote effective intellectual property rights (IPRs), and to ensure that measures to enforce IPRs do not themselves become barriers to legitimate trade." The agreement provides a framework of principles, rules and disciplines dealing with international trade as well as resolving trade related disputes among nations. The treaty also takes into account the needs of less developed member nations among others. It is recognized as one of the most comprehensive multilateral agreements on intellectual property.

==== Patent Cooperation Treaty (PCT) ====
The Patent Cooperation Treaty (PCT) of 1970 is an international treaty participated upon by 148 member nations that allows applicants to simultaneously apply for patent protection for an invention within the participating countries. The Philippines was bound to the treaty on August 17, 2001. The international patent application is available to citizens or residents of the participating states by accomplishing the application at their respective national patent office or at the WIPO International Bureau. Accomplishing the application "has the effect of automatically designating all Contracting States bound by the PCT on the international filing date. The effect of the international application is the same in each designated State as if a national patent application had been filed with the national patent office of that State."

==== WIPO Copyright Treaty ====
The WIPO Copyright Treaty of 1996 is a special agreement enacted by the members of the World Intellectual Property Organization that is concerned with new intellectual property issues that are not covered by predating treatises due to coming of the digital age. The treaty also concerns itself with the addition of subjects to be protected by copyright such as computer programs, databases, as well the rights to distribute these intellectual property. The treaty came into force in 2002.

==== For Specific Intellectual Property ====
The Philippines is also a signatory in numerous other international treaties that are concerned with intellectual property within specific fields such as literature, art, music, industry, biology, and the licensing and distribution of multimedia, to name a few.

- Berne Convention for the Protection of Literary and Artistic Works (1886)
- Paris Convention for the Protection of Industrial Property (1883)
- Budapest Treaty on the International Recognition of the Deposit of Microorganisms for the Purposes of Patent Procedure (1977)
- Rome Convention for the Protection of Performers, Producers of Phonograms and Broadcasting Organisations (1961)

=== Regional ===
==== ASEAN Framework Agreement on Intellectual Property Cooperation ====
The ASEAN Framework Agreement on Intellectual Property Cooperation is a treaty devised among the member nations of the Association of Southeast Asian Nations. The treaty was ratified in Bangkok, Thailand on December 15, 1995. The treaty seeks to foster cooperation among the member states to facilitate synergy and growth in the region however the treaty has yet to be implemented in force.

=== Bilateral ===
==== Economic Partnership Agreement between Japan and the Philippines ====
The Economic Partnership Agreement between Japan and the Philippines was adopted on September 9, 2006 and went into force on December 11, 2008. It is a trade agreement between the countries of Japan and the Philippines with the aim of "liberalizing and facilitating trade in goods and services between both nations as well as to increase investment opportunities and strengthen protection for investments and investment activities."

==== Agreement between the Government of Canada and the Government of the Republic of the Philippines for the Promotion and Reciprocal Protection of Investments ====
The economic treaty between the states of Canada and the Philippines was adopted on November 9, 1995 and put into effect on November 13, 1996. The treaty strives to increase cooperation between the two countries by increasing the opportunities for mutual economic growth by promoting and facilitating investment opportunities.

== Conditions on Patentability ==
WIPO's policies and laws state that for an invention to be eligible for patenting, it must fulfill several criteria. Generally, the invention must be within patentable subject matter, must have industrial use or applicability (utility), it must be new (novel) and must exhibit a sufficient "inventive step" (non-obviousness).

=== Patentable Subject Matter ===
Patentable subject matter is usually defined in terms of exceptions to patentability. Some examples of fields not within the scope of patentable subject matters are:

- discoveries of materials or substances already existing in nature
- scientific theories or mathematical methods
- flora and fauna other than microorganisms, and biological processes for the production of flora and fauna other than microbiological processes
- schemes, rules or methods, such as those for doing business, performing purely mental acts or playing games
- diagnostic/non-diagnostic methods of treatment for, or practiced on, humans or animals (but not products for use in such methods)
- inventions of commercial exploitation of which would conflict with public order or morality

=== Utility ===
For an invention to be patentable, the invention must have practical applicability and not purely theoretical. If an invention is a product or a part of a product, then it should be possible to make that product and if the invention is a process or a part of a process then the process should be executable or it should be possible to use the process in practice. Here, "applicability" and "industrial applicability" refers to the possibility of making or producing in practice, or carrying out or using in practice. The term "industrial" should be referred to in its broadest sense, which includes any kind of industry recognized by the country.

=== Novel ===
Novelty is a fundamental requirement of patentability, however it cannot be proven or established; only its absence can be proved. For an invention to be considered "novel", it must not have been anticipated by the knowledge that existed prior to relevant filing or priority date of a patent application whether it existed by the way of written or oral disclosure. This disclosure can come in the form of:

- a description of the invention in published writing or publication in other forms
- a description of the invention in spoken words uttered in public; oral disclosure, which may not be recorded
- using the invention in public, or by putting the public in a position that allows anyone in the public to use it- "disclosure by use" such as display, sale, demonstration and actual public use.

In considering novelty, it's not permissible to combine separate items of prior knowledge/inventions together.

=== Non-obviousness ===
Inventive step is perhaps the most difficult of the standards to determine patentability as it asks the question "would it have been obvious to a person having ordinary skill in the art?" The inclusion of this requirement works under the premise that anything of obvious consequence of prior knowledge is in itself part of prior knowledge. While novelty considers whether there is a difference between the invention and prior knowledge, "inventive step" is concerned with how different is the invention to prior knowledge. There must be some significant or identifiable difference/advance/progress between the invention and prior knowledge. Also, this advance or progress must be essential to the invention. Unlike the assessment of novelty which looks at the difference between the invention and prior knowledge as a whole, inventive step is assessed through combinations of prior knowledge. In most cases, it is useful to assess the inventive step in relation to 3 aspects: the problem to be solved; the solution to that problem; and the advantageous effects, if any, of the invention with reference to the background art. If the problem is obvious, the examination will bear on the originality of the solution claimed.

== Process of acquiring a patent ==
=== Procedure ===
==== Application ====
The application must be filed at the Intellectual Property Office or through the IPOPHL TM eFile online. The forms and fees can be accessed at the Philippine IPO Website. The process begins with obtaining a filing date by submitting the following documents:

- Properly filled-out Request Form for a Grant of Philippine Patent;
- Name, address and signature of applicant(s); for non-resident applicant, the name and address of his/her/their resident agent; and
- Description of the invention and one or more claims

Other formal requirements, which are not needed to obtain a filing date, but may be included at the time of filing are:

- A filing fee (for big or small entities which may be paid during application filing or within one month from the date of filing).
- Drawing(s) necessary to understand the invention;
- An abstract and
- If the priority of an earlier filed application is being claimed, the details of the claim, i.e. filing date, file number and country of origin.

==== Formality of Examination ====
An examiner checks if the applicant has fulfilled all the formal requirements needed for the grant of a filing date. A filing date is important because it serves to determine, in case of a dispute, who has the right to the patent based on a "first-to-file" system.

==== Publication of Unexamined Application ====
The application will be published in the IPO Gazette for 18 months where any person may present observations in writing concerning the patentability of the invention. The applicant may be able to respond through writing.

==== Request for Substantive Examination ====
This must be filed within six (6) months from the date of publication. The application is considered withdrawn if no request is made within that period. If the examiner finds reason to refuse the registration of the application, i.e. the application is neither new, inventive nor industrially applicable, the Bureau shall notify the applicant of the reason for refusal/rejection giving the applicant the chance to defend or amend the application.

==== Decision to Grant Patent or Refusal ====
if the examiner finds the application satisfactory with no reason for refusal, or the reason for refusal has been properly amended or corrected, the examiner issues a decision to grant the patent registration. If not, the examiner refuses the application.

==== Inspection of Records ====
The grant of a patent together with other information shall be published in the IPO Gazette within six (6) months.

==== Appeal ====
(a) Every applicant may appeal to the Director of Patents the final refusal of the examiner to grant the patent within two (2) months from the mailing date of the final refusal. The decision or order of the Director shall become final and executory fifteen (15) days after receipt of a copy by the appellant unless within the same period, a motion for reconsideration is filed with the Director or an appeal to the Director General is filed together with the payment of the required fee. (b) The decision of the Director General may be appealed to the Court of Appeals. If the applicant is still not satisfied with the decision of the Court of Appeals, he may appeal to the Supreme Court.

=== IPOPHL TM eFile ===
The IPOPHL TM eFile is the new electronic filing system for patents launched as part of the World IP Day Celebrations on April 23, 2016. It allows the online filing of new trademark applications 24/77 and is linked to three different payment applications. It removes the need for applicants and IP agents to go to the IPOPHL to file trademark applications.

It is linked to two other tools - ASEAN TMclass which makes the classification of goods and services much easier, and National IPOPHL TMview that allows the generation of preliminary search reports that applicants may use as reference prior to filling. But its most important feature is the ease of uploading documents together with the online application.

It is expected to go on production in June 2016. As of now, the IPOPHL eTMfile is accessible to all trademark stakeholders.

=== Offices involved ===
==== Intellectual Property Office of the Philippines ====
The Intellectual Property Code of the Philippines, Republic Act No. 8293, created the Intellectual Property Office of the Philippines (IPOPHL) that serves to administer and implement the laws regarding intellectual property rights as stated in the Act. Under the IPOPHL, the Bureau of Patents handles the screening of patent applications and the subsequent granting of these patents. It also handles the registration of utility model, industrial design, and integrated circuit, and the publications of these patents. The bureau assists the Director General of the IPOPHL, who has the authority to formulate policies on the administration and examination of patents, by conducting studies and researches in the field.

==== Court of Appeals ====
If the application of a patent is refused by the Director General of IPOPHL, the decision may be appealed to the Court of Appeals. The Court of Appeals is composed of a Presiding Justice and 68 Associate Justices. It reviews the decisions of all Regional Trial Courts as well as the Office of the Ombudsman, and those of the Department of Justice and other agencies exercising quasi-judicial functions, including the Office of the President. The court can reverse, affirm, or modify the judgement that was previously made. It can also remand the case to the regional trial courts for a new trial or a retrial, or dismiss the case entirely.

==== Supreme Court ====
If the applicant is still not satisfied with the decision of the Court of Appeals, then the decision on application of the patent may be appealed to the Supreme Court. The Supreme Court has the duty to "settle actual controversies involving rights which are legally demandable and enforceable, and to determine whether or not there has been a grave abuse of discretion amounting to lack or excess of jurisdiction on the part of any branch or instrumentality of the Government." It has both original and appellate jurisdiction and can review, revise, reverse, modify, or affirm on appeal or certiorari, and may provide a final judgement. In the event that the application for the patent is still not approved by the Supreme Court, then the application has been completely refused and has no chance of appeal.

== See also ==
- Philippine trademark law
