= Philippine trademark law =

Intellectual Property Code of the Philippines

10th Congress of the Philippines
- Long title: An Act Prescribing the Intellectual Property Code and Establishing the Intellectual Property Office, Providing for its Powers and Functions, and for Other Purposes
- Territorial extent: Whole of the Philippines
- Passed by: Senate of the Philippines
- Passed: June 4, 1997
- Passed by: House of Representatives of the Philippines
- Passed: June 5, 1997
- Signed by: Fidel V. Ramos, President of the Philippines
- Signed: June 6, 1997; 27 years ago
- Commenced: January 1, 1998
- Status: In force

Republic Act No. 8293, otherwise known as the Intellectual Property Code of the Philippines, defines a trademark as “any visible sign capable of distinguishing goods”. Early jurisprudence has taken it to mean “a sign, device or mark by which the articles produced or dealt in by a particular person or organization are distinguished or distinguishable from those produced or dealt in by others, and must be affixed to goods or articles”.

== Defining concepts in trademark law ==
=== International sources ===
On September 27, 1965, the Philippines adopted pertinent provisions of the Lisbon Act of the Paris Convention for the Protection of Industrial Property by reference as part of the Intellectual Property Code. As a multilateral treaty, the Paris Convention seeks to “protect industrial property … and at the same time repress unfair competition”. It also “provides for the protection of internationally well-known marks” and “applications claiming the priority date of an earlier-filed application in Member Countries”.

Another treaty pertinent to intellectual property rights, particularly trademarks, is the Agreement Establishing the World Trade Organization (WTO), which the Philippines ratified on December 16, 1994, and which treaty took effect only on January 1, 1995. Annexed to this is the Agreement on Trade-Related Aspects of Intellectual Property Rights (TRIPS) which aims to “reduce distortions … in international trade … promote effective and adequate protection of intellectual property rights…. [and] adhere to minimum standards of protection set by several conventions.... The TRIPS Agreement seeks to grant adequate protection of intellectual property rights by creating a favorable economic environment to encourage the inflow of foreign investments, and strengthening the multilateral trading system to bring about economic, cultural, and technological independence.”

=== Statutory bases ===
The first trademark law in place in the Philippines was that which Queen Maria Cristina of Spain promulgated on October 26, 1888. This law accorded trademark rights to the person who registered first.

This law was replaced on March 6, 1903 by Act No. 666 or the Trademark and Trade Name Law of the Philippine Islands, which abandoned prior registration in favor of actual use of the mark as the basis for trademark rights. The Philippines, being then a territory of the United States, incorporated into Act 666 principles upon which the U.S. trademark law was founded on.

Republic Act No. 166 repealed Act 666 in 1946, and was itself expressly repealed on January 1, 1998 when Republic Act No. 8293 was enacted in compliance with the WTO TRIPS Agreement.

== See also ==
- Constitution of the Philippines
- Intellectual property organization
- United Kingdom trademark law
- United States trademark law
- Patents in the Philippines
