= Micro business in the Philippines =

Micro businesses in the Philippines can be defined according to the size of assets, size of equity capital, and number of employees. A typical micro business is a business that employs nine people or fewer, with assets of ₱3 million and below.

In the Philippines, about 90 percent of all businesses are categorized as micro businesses. These consist of enterprises engaged in industry, agribusiness and or services, whether single proprietorship, cooperative, partnership or corporation. Their total assets, inclusive of those arising from loans but exclusive of the land on which the particular business entity’s office, plant and equipment are situated, have value of not more than ₱3 million.

Of all micro businesses, about 46 percent are involved in the wholesale, retail and repair business; 27.6 percent are in the accommodations and food service; 13.5 percent are in manufacturing; while 12.5 percent are engaged in other service categories.

== History ==
The “Magna Carta for Micro, Small and Medium Enterprises (MSMEs)” is a landmark legislation that defines the current national policy to promote, support, strengthen, and encourage the growth and development of MSMEs. The start-up capital for Small Business is 15 million and below, Medium Business is 15.1 Million to 300 million, and 300.1 million are Large size of Businesses.

Enacted by the Philippine Congress in 1991 as RA 6977, amended by Republic Act 8289 in 1997, and further amended by RA 9501 in 2008, the law is geared towards the development of the Filipino entrepreneurial spirit by providing a business environment conducive for MSMEs.

The full texts of RA 6977, RA 8289, and RA 9501 and its IRR including the revised rules and regulations governing the mandatory allocation of credit resources provide ready reference for a complete compilation of laws on the Magna Carta for MSMEs.

== Comparison to other business models ==
Here is a quick guide to properly differentiate a micro business from other types of businesses:

Category	Assets	No. of Employees
small	₱15 million and below	50 employees or less
Medium	₱15- 300 million	100-199 employees
Large	₱300 million and above	200 employees and up

MSMEs businesses are driven by profitability and stable long-term value.

A startup business’ objectives are focused on top-end revenue and growth potential. As defined by Steve Banks : “Start-up entrepreneurs have a more idealistic mentality, being more socialist, vs. the SME entrepreneurs, which are more financially driven. It is a “temporary organization designed to search for a repeatable and scalable business model.” A startup is searching for answers to the product it will sell, the customer it will serve and the way it will make money from delivering value to its customers.

== Barangay Micro Business Enterprise (BMBE) ==
A business which falls under the Republic Act 9501 Magna Carta for Micro, Small, Medium Enterprise (MSME) is eligible of the following incentives from the BMBE:

1. Income tax exemption from income arising from the operations of the enterprise
2. Exemption from the coverage of the Minimum Wage Law (BMBE employees will still receive the same social security and health care benefits as other employees)
3. Priority to a special credit window set up specifically for the financing requirements of BMBEs
4. Technology transfer, production and management training, and marketing assistance programs for BMBE beneficiaries.

The government, in its objective to strengthen Barangay Micro Business Enterprises in the country and provide more jobs, livelihood and a better quality of life for Filipinos, has enacted Republic Act 9178, otherwise known as the “Barangay Micro Business Enterprises Act of 2002”.

In other words, a business or activity may be eligible to register as BMBE if they meet the following criteria:

1. The business enterprise is engaged in production, processing, or manufacturing of products, including agro-processing, as well as trading and services.
2. The business enterprise has total assets of ₱3 million or less including those arising from loans but excluding the land on which the plant and equipment are located.
3. The business enterprise or service provider, in connection with his or her exercise of profession, is not a professional who is duly licensed by the government after having passed a government licensure examination for aspiring accountants, lawyers, doctors, and other professions.
4. The business enterprise is not a branch, subsidiary, division or office of a large scale enterprise or it is not a franchisee.

== Recent Developments ==
Senator Bam Aquino was reported to announce his intention to pass two bills on MSMEs within a year. These are: the Small Business Tax Reform Act, which aims to give MSMEs a three-year operation period before imposing taxes; and the Philippine Startup Bill, which seeks to provide a viable environment for startups.

President Rodrigo Duterte has announced during his SONA held on July 25, 2016 that he vows to carry out the following during his term:

1. Improve the Ease of Doing Business ranking of the Philippines
2. Cut processing times and streamline requirements by:
  - Addressing bottlenecks in business registration and processing
  - Streamlining investment applications processes
  - Integrating the services of various government offices

DTI Region 10 has held the "Negosyo Konsumer at iba pa" for MSMEs and consumers last August 17–19, 2016 in Cagayan de Oro.

The activity included the launching of a fabrication laboratory; innovation technopreneurship; the Negosyo Center in the region; an E-Commerce forum; and a host of trainings for various business types.

== "ThinkMicro" Model ==
Since the third quarter of 2016, a move to empower micro businesses through an active eco system of support through funding, logistics and creative guidance has begun to take place. The move challenges everyone to consider the micro business model as a viable business option, and empowers aspiring entrepreneurs to pursue their business goals with the support they need. It gives due emphasis to the microbusiness model and how it can grow into a strong and stable enterprise that generates a steady stream of income, enough for it to expand as a world-class conglomerate while staying in the micro model.

It challenges the status quo to #thinkmicro, as the current hashtag relating to this school of thought suggests.

The move is both a nod and a push toward greater influence to earlier efforts of business advocates with similar intentions. Among them, the Go Negosyo]and DTI’s Kapatid campaign; Josiah Go's mentoring programs; and PLDT's SME Nation "Ka-Asenso" campaign.
