= The Last Journey of Ninoy =

2009 Philippine documentary film

- Film poster
- Directed by: Jun Reyes
- Written by: Daime Dumaup; Ma. Jovita Zarate; Jun Reyes; Divine Gil Reyes
- Produced by: Tony Gloria
- Starring: Bam Aquino; Pia Millado
- Edited by: Claire Villareal
- Music by: Jasper Perez and Khalil Al khalil
- Production company: Benigno Aquino Jr. Foundation
- Distributed by: Unitel Productions, Inc.
- Release date: August 21, 2009
- Running time: 55 minutes
- Country: Philippines
- Languages: Filipino; English

The Last Journey of Ninoy is a 2009 Philippine documentary film directed by Jun Reyes that premiered on August 21, 2009, in commemoration of Ninoy Aquino Day and on August 23 at ABS-CBN. The film includes the final interview given by Aquino's wife who then became the first woman to Philippine presidency, Corazon Aquino. It was produced by Unitel Productions, Inc. and the Benigno Aquino Jr. Foundation.

== Synopsis ==
It is about the story of the final days of Aquino from August 12, 1983, to August 21 till he was assassinated at Manila International Airport. It features interviews and commentaries from Aquino's wife and former Philippine president, Corazon Aquino.

== Cast ==
- Bam Aquino as Ninoy Aquino
- Pia Millado as Cory Aquino
- Paul Aquino as Ninoy Aquino (voice-over)

== Release and reception ==
The film premiered on August 21, 2009, at the Powerplant Mall in Makati. On August 23, the film premiered in national television simultaneously via ABS-CBN and also simulcasted on the ABS-CBN News Channel (ANC) and The Filipino Channel (TFC). Since August 21, 2020, the film is streaming on ABS-CBN's streaming service iWant (later renamed as iWant TFC due to the service's merger with TFC Online).

=== Critical response ===
Reviews for the documentary film were generally positive. Rose Feliciano of the ABS-CBN News wrote "I was touched and I cried at the end of the film!" and "As I am! This film must be shown to all students nationwide...and to the public in general .....again and again! It truly inspires!"

== Accolades ==
The film was a finalist in the 2010 Al Jazeera International Documentary Film Festival and in the 2010 New York Film Festival.
