= Universal Access to Quality Tertiary Education Act =

Philippine law

Congress of the Philippines
- Long title: An Act Promoting Universal Access to Quality Tertiary Education by Providing for Free Tuition and Other School Fees in State Universities and Colleges, Local Universities and Colleges and State-Run Technical Vocational Institutions, Establishing the Tertiary Education Subsidy and Student Loan Program, Strengthening the Unified Student Financial Assistance System for Tertiary Education and Appropriating Funds Therefor
- Citation: Republic Act No. 10931
- Territorial extent: Philippines
- Passed by: House of Representatives of the Philippines
- Passed: May 30, 2017
- Passed by: Senate of the Philippines
- Passed: May 29, 2017
- Signed by: President Rodrigo Duterte
- Signed: August 3, 2017
- Administered by: Universal Access to Quality Education Act

Legislative history

Initiating chamber: House of Representatives of the Philippines
- Bill citation: House Bill No. 5633
- Second reading: May 16, 2017
- Third reading: May 22, 2017
- Committee report: Committee Report No. 227

Revising chamber: Senate of the Philippines
- Bill title: Free Higher Education for All Act
- Bill citation: Senate Bill No. 1304
- Received from the House of Representatives of the Philippines: January 23, 2017
- Member(s) in charge: Ralph Recto, Sonny Angara et.al. and Principally sponsored by Bam Aquino
- First reading: January 23, 2017
- Second reading: March 7, 2017
- Third reading: March 13, 2017

Amended by
- Republic Act No. 12325
- Status: Amended

The Universal Access to Quality Tertiary Education Act (UAQTE), officially designated as Republic Act 10931, is a Philippine law that institutionalizes free tuition and exemption from other fees in state universities and colleges (SUCs), and local universities and colleges (LUCs) in the Philippines. The law also foresees subsidies for private higher education institutions. It is intended to give underprivileged Filipino students a better chance to earn a college degree.

== History ==
Senate Bill No. 1304 or the "Free Higher Education for All Act" was approved with 18 affirmative votes, no negative vote and no abstention. The bill was sponsored and authored by Senator Bam Aquino IV, former chairman of the Senate Committee on Education, Arts and Culture. Apart from Aquino, the bill was co-authored by Senate President Pro Tempore Ralph Recto, along with Senators Sonny Angara, Leila de Lima, Win Gatchalian, JV Ejercito, Dick Gordon, Loren Legarda, Kiko Pangilinan, Cynthia Villar, Joel Villanueva and Migz Zubiri. Recto, Angara, Ejercito, Legarda, Gatchalian, and Zubiri also served as the bill's co-sponsors during its deliberation at the Senate floor.

It was signed into law on August 3, 2017. The bill is supported by almost all members of Congress In September 2017, the chairman of the House Committee on Appropriations announced that P40 billion had been gathered and that this amount would finance all expenses foreseen by the law for 2018.

On March 26, 2018, the Commission on Higher Education (CHED) released the implementing rules and regulations (IRR) pertaining to the Act.

Before the signing of the bill by the President, the government took the view after intense political discussions that "the long-term benefits that will be derived from a well-developed tertiary education on the part of the citizenry will definitely outweigh any short-term budgetary challenges". The government also stated that the "bottom 20 percent" was to have priority concerning the allocation of subsidies for education-related expenses.

On September 4, 2026, President Bongbong Marcos signed a law amending the Universal Access to Quality Tertiary Education Act or Republic Act No. 12325.

== Requirements and benefits ==
To continuously benefit from the law, students must meet all the admission and retention requirements. That is, they need to pass the admission and retention requirements of the universities, which includes finishing their degree on time and enrolling in the required number of units per year.

Persons who have already obtained a bachelor's degree or comparable undergraduate degree from any public or private higher education institution are not eligible for free education.

The Implementing Rules and Regulations (IRR) foresee different benefits depending on the type of institution in which the student enrols:

- All (eligible) Filipino students enrolled in courses leading to a bachelor's degree in state universities and colleges (SUCs), local universities and colleges (LUCs) and technical-vocational schools will be exempted from paying tuition and other school fees. They are also exempted from admission fees and fees for the use of library, laboratory and computers. For those enrolled in technical-vocational schools, further fees are exempted, including the cost of utilities, facilities, equipment and tools maintenance, as well as the honoraria of trainers. Other school fees that are covered are specified under Sections 4 and 5 of RA 10931 and are further detailed in the Implementing Rules and Regulations.
- For those enrolled in private higher education institutions, a subsidy for tuition and other school fees is available.

The law also includes provisions for student loans. According to the IRR, students with financial capacity may opt out of the benefits prescribed by the law.

== Transitional measures ==
- Resolution No. 620 – Reimbursements of fees paid for 2018:

In February 2018, the Senate unanimously passed Senate Resolution No. 620 (Adopted Resolution No. 85) which called for the full and immediate implementation of the new law in the second school semester of 2017–2018. The senator who had sponsored this resolution, Bam Aquino, urged schools to adhere in full to the new law, which was all the more necessary as Filipino families were shouldering rising prices in goods and services due to the passage of the Tax Reform for Acceleration and Inclusion Law (TRAIN Law), and to refund whatever fees they may have continued to collect for that semester.

- Free Tuition 2017 program – Reimbursements based on an income-based ranking:

The Free Tuition 2017 program allowed SUCs received reimbursement for deserving students already for first semester of academic year 2017–2018, based on an income-based ranking of the students.

== See also ==
- DuterteNomics
- Education in the Philippines
- Free education
- Libreng Kolehiyo Website
