= Intellectual Property Office of the Philippines =

Philippine government agency

- Logo

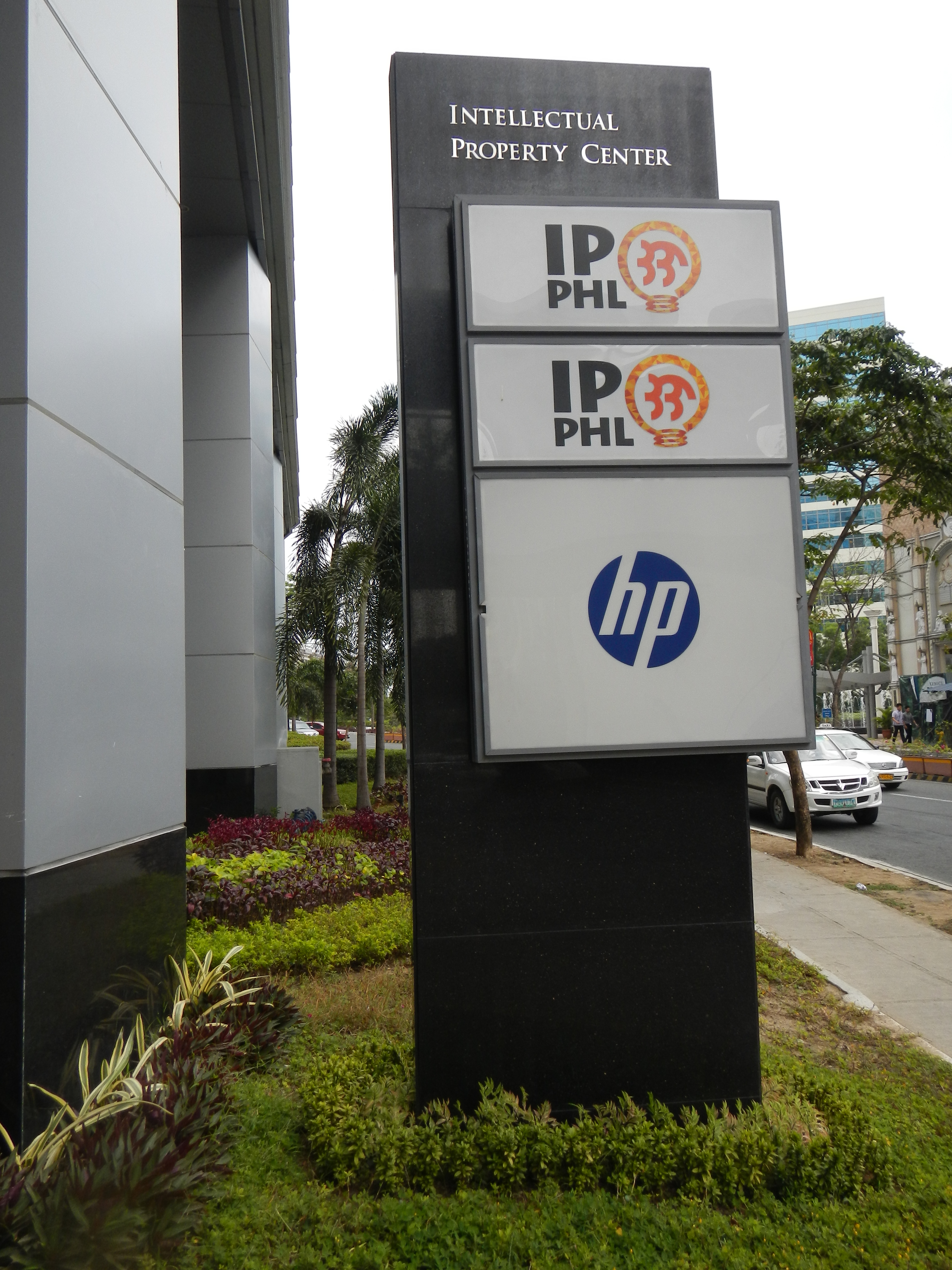
- Intellectual Property Center

Agency overview
- Formed: January 1, 1998
- Type: Intellectual property organization, Government agency
- Headquarters: Intellectual Property Center, 28 Upper McKinley Road, McKinley Hill Town Center, Bonifacio Global City, Taguig
- Agency executive: Atty. Teodoro C. Pascua, Director General
- Parent agency: Department of Trade and Industry
- Website: www.ipophil.gov.ph

The Intellectual Property Office of the Philippines (IPOPHL) is a government agency attached to the Department of Trade and Industry in charge of registration of intellectual property and conflict resolution of intellectual property rights in the Philippines.

== History ==
It was established under Republic Act No. 8293 also known as Intellectual Property Code of the Philippines, which took effect on January 1, 1998, during the administration President Fidel V. Ramos.

Under guiding theme "Unlocking the Future: Tech Trends and Challenges in Copyright," GMA Network and IPOPHL launch the Second Philippine International Copyright Summit from October 21 to 25, 2024 at Novotel Manila Araneta City.

At the end of the Riyadh Diplomatic Conference of 2024 on 22 November, IPOPHL's Director General Rowel S. Barba and the 192 World Intellectual Property Organization member states adopted and signed the 28th WIPO Treaty, the Riyadh Design Law Treaty.

== Bureaus ==
- Bureau of Legal Affairs
- Bureau of Patents
- Bureau of Trademarks
- Bureau of Copyrights and Related Rights
- Documentation, Information and Technology Transfer Bureau
- Management Information Services
- Financial, Management and Administrative Services

== See also ==
- Copyright law of the Philippines
