= Rags2Riches =

Philippines social enterprise

Poverty Incidence Among Families (estimates in %)
Region/Province	2003	2006	2009
Philippines	20.0	21.1	20.9
Region IV-A	9.2	9.4	10.3
Batangas	13.8	12.7	14.0
Cavite	4.8	4.2	4.5
Laguna	5.2	4.5	5.9
Quezon	23.2	26.7	24.5
Rizal b/	2.9	2.7	6.5

Rags2Riches (R2R) is a social enterprise that was established in 2007 and is based in the Philippines. R2R’s contributions to society lie mainly in its endeavours to alleviate poverty in Payatas, Quezon City. Statistics from the National Statistical Coordination Board of the Philippines show that Quezon City has the highest incidence of poverty in the region it lies in and the figures are also much higher than the national average. R2R works with women from these poor communities in Payatas to increase their levels of income and bring them out of poverty.

A potential obstacle in raising income levels to fight poverty is that help is only rendered to a handful of people due to a lack of reach. R2R assisted in the process of pushing the products made by the women into the top-end of the market. The in-demand products allow for an increase in the reach of the project. The Rags2Riches Project is expected to impact 5,000 women in the next 5 years, an increase from a few hundred today. In addition, another project will be focusing on the development and creation of new products that could be made from the rugs that the women produce. This will be done through the establishment of the R2R Innovation and Social Entrepreneurship Centre.

Apart from addressing the issue of income poverty, R2R has embarked on various programs to develop the women as individuals who can function better in society. R2R has a program which imparts business and life skills to the women. This includes areas such as personal finance, health insurance and nutrition. Another project comes in the form of a compulsory savings scheme to be used for social security, education or healthcare in future.
