= Copyright law of the Philippines =

A copyright is the legal protection granted to the owner of the rights to an original work. An original work refers to every production in the literary, scientific, and artistic domains. The Intellectual Property Office of the Philippines (IPOPHL) is the government agency responsible for the registration and dispute resolution of intellectual property (IP) rights and for enforcing the country's copyright laws. IPOPHL was created under Republic Act No. 8293, or the Intellectual Property Code of the Philippines, which took effect on January 1, 1998, during the presidency of Fidel V. Ramos.

Under the Intellectual Property Code of the Philippines, literary and artistic works include books, writings, musical works, films, paintings, and other works, including computer programs.

Copyright subsists in a work from the moment of its creation, regardless of its mode or form of expression, content, quality, or purpose.

== Works covered ==
Works covered by the copyright law are (1) literary and artistic works and (2) derivative works. On the other hand, works not protected by the copyright law are (1) unprotected subject matter and (2) works of the government.

=== Literary and artistic works ===
According to Section 172 of the Intellectual Property Code, literary and artistic works refer to the original and intellectual creations protected from the moment of their creation.

The list of literary and artistic works includes the following:

- Books, pamphlets, articles and other writings.
- Periodicals and newspapers
- Lectures, sermons, addresses, dissertations prepared for oral delivery, whether or not reduced in writing or other material form
- Letters
- Dramatic or dramatico-musical compositions; choreographic works or entertainment in dumb shows
- Musical compositions, with or without words
- Works of drawing, painting, architecture, sculpture, engraving, lithography or other works of art; models or designs for works of art.
- Original ornamental designs or models for articles of manufacture, whether or not registrable as an industrial design, and other works of applied art
- Illustrations, maps, plans, sketches, charts and three-dimensional works relative to geography, topography, architecture or science
- Drawings or plastic works of a scientific or technical character
- Photographic works including works produced by a process analogous to photography; lantern slides
- Audiovisual works and cinematographic works and works produced by a process analogous to cinematography or any process for making audio-visual recordings
- Pictorial illustrations and advertisements
- Computer programs
- Other literary, scholarly, scientific and artistic works

=== Derivative works ===
According to Section 173.2 of the Intellectual Property Code, derivative works are defined as new work provided that they do not violate any subsisting copyright upon the original work employed or any part thereof, or to imply any right to such use of the original works, or to secure or extend copyright in such original works.

The list of derivative works includes the following:

- Dramatizations, translations, adaptations, abridgements, arrangements, and other alterations of literary or artistic works
- Collections of literary, scholarly or artistic works, and compilations of data and other materials which are original by reason of the selection or coordination or arrangement of their contents.

According to Section 174 which refers to the case of a published edition of work, the publisher has the copyright consisting merely of the right of reproduction of the typographical arrangement of the published edition of the work.

=== Unprotected subject matter ===
The list of unprotected subject matter include the following:

- Any idea, procedure, system, method or operation, concept, principle, discovery or mere data as such, even if they are expressed, explained, illustrated or embodied in a work
- News of the day and other miscellaneous facts having the character of mere items of press information
- Any official text of a legislative, administrative or legal nature, as well as any official translation thereof

=== Works of the government ===
According to Section 176 of Republic Act 8293, no copyright shall be applied in any work of the Government of the Philippines. To exploit such works for profit, prior approval from the government agency or office should be made. Such agency or office may impose payment of royalties. It is not required to seek prior approval or conditions for the use for any purpose of statutes, rules and regulations, and speeches, lectures, sermons, addresses, and dissertations, pronounced, read or rendered in courts of justice, before administrative agencies, in deliberative assemblies and in meetings of public character.

== Ownership ==
According to Section 178 and 179 of Republic Act 8293, the copyright ownership is under the following rules:

- Copyright shall belong to the author of the work for original literary and artistic works
- For works with joint ownership, all the authors will be recognized as original owners. In the absence of agreement, their rights shall fall under the rules of co-ownership. In the case of works whose author per part can be identified, the author of each part shall be considered as the owner of the copyright in that respective part.
- For works created during the course of employment of an author, copyright ownership are as follows:
  - If the object of ownership is not a part of the regular duties of the author, the employee shall get the copyright even if he/she used the time, facilities, and materials of the employer.
  - If the work is an output of the author for his regularly-assigned duties, the employer shall get the copyright unless there is an agreement to the contrary.
- For works created in pursuance of a commission to the author by a person other than his/her employer, the ownership shall be granted to the person who commissioned but the copyright ownership shall remain with the creator, unless there is an agreement to the contrary.
- For audiovisual works, the copyright shall belong to the producer, the author of the scenario, the composer of the music, the film director, and the author of the work adapted. However, the producer shall exercise copyright only up to what is required for the exhibition of the work, except for the right to collect performing license fees for the performance of the compositions incorporated into the work.
- For letters, the copyright shall belong to the writer subject to Article 723 of the Civil Code.
- For anonymous works and works under a pseudonym, the publisher shall represent the work's author who are either anonymous or under a pseudonym, unless the contrary appears or the author discloses his/her identity.

== Types of Rights under the Law of Copyright ==
These are the rights that authors are entitled to according to the law of copyright, under Part IV of R.A. 8293, or the Intellectual Property Code of the Philippines.

=== Economic Rights ===
This allows a creator to ask for or obtain payment for the use of their work by third parties. According to Section 177 of the Law of Copyright, these rights consist of the right to allow, impede, or carry out the following by the author:

- Replication of the work, or a portion of the work
- Transformation or dramatization of the original work
- The first public distribution of the original work and each copy of the work
- Rental of the original work, or copy of the work embodied in any form, including audiovisuals, cinematography, sound recordings, computer programming, or graphic work, regardless of ownership of the original work
- Public display of the original or copy of the work
- Public performance of the work
- Other communication of the work to the public

=== Moral Rights ===
These rights allow the author of the work to maintain their personal connection to the work, and to undertake measures in order to protect this connection. The author of the work, independent of the economic rights, also have the right to:

- Require the authorship of the work be attributed to him or her, meaning that the author may require that their name be displayed in a prominent fashion on a copy or public distribution or use of the work
- To make any transformation or adjustment to the work, or withhold it from publication
- To oppose any and all mutilation or any other derogatory action to the work which could potentially be detrimental to the author's honor and reputation
- To refuse to the use of the author's name on any mutilated or distorted version of his work, or any work not of his own creation

==== Exceptions to moral rights ====
- Under Section 195 of the Law on Copyright, an author may waive his moral rights through a written contract. However, this contract is deemed invalid if it allows third parties to do the following:
  - Make use of the author's name, the title of the work, or the author's reputation, in any version or adaptation of the work which could harm or be detrimental to the artistic reputation of another author
  - Make use of an author's name for a piece of work not of his own creation
- The right of an author to have his contribution to a collective work credited to his name is deemed waived. A collective work here is defined as work created by two or more persons and under the understanding that the work will be attributed to the person whose direction said work is under. It is also understood that contributing natural persons will not be identified.
- If an author licenses or permits a third party to make use of their work, any necessary transformation, such as arranging, editing, or adaptations of work for use in publications, broadcast, or motion pictures, in accordance with the standards of the medium in which the work is to be used, shall not be found in contrary to the author's rights. In addition, the destruction of work unconditionally and completely transferred by an author shall likewise not be found in violation of the author's rights.

=== Resale rights ===
The author and their heirs have the inalienable right to partake of 5% of the proceeds of the sale or lease of their original work (painting, sculpture, manuscript, composition). This inalienable right is in effect during the lifetime of the author, and for fifty years after their death.

=== Related rights ===
Related rights are the rights of those whose help the author avails of in order to assist him in producing his work, and distributing this work to the public. These rights are also referred to as "neighboring rights" and include the following:

- Rights of performers
- Rights of producers of sound recordings
- Rights of broadcasting organizations

== Infringement ==
=== Acts constituting infringement ===
Section 216 of Republic Act No. 10372 states that a person infringes a right protected under this Act when one:

- Directly commits an infringement against copyright;
- Benefits from the infringing activity of another person who commits an infringement if the person benefiting has been given notice of the infringing activity and has the right and ability to control the activities of the other person;
- With knowledge of infringing activity, induces, causes or materially contributes to the infringing conduct of another.

=== Liabilities of infringement ===
Any person found infringing rights protected under RA 10372 shall be liable:

- To pay the copyright owner actual damages, legal costs, and other expenses, that may have been incurred due to infringement as well as profits earned by the infringement.

Instead of recovering actual damages and profits, the copyright owner may file instead for an award of statutory damages for all infringements involved for not less than Fifty thousand pesos (Php 50,000.00). The court may consider the following factors in awarding statutory damages:

- The nature and purpose of the infringing act;
- The flagrancy of the infringement;
- Whether the defendant acted in bad faith;
- The need for deterrence;
- Any loss that the plaintiff has suffered or is likely to suffer by reason of the infringement; and
- Any benefit shown to have accrued to the defendant by reason of the infringement.

== Limitations ==
The following acts shall not constitute infringement of copyright:

- The recitation or performance of a work, if it had been made accessible to the public, and if done in private and free of charge. Performance of a work done under a charitable or religious institution shall also fall under this.
- The quotation of published works if they are compatible with fair use and only to an extent. This includes quotations from newspaper articles and periodicals provided that the source and the name of the author, if available, are mentioned.
- The reproduction of articles or communication by the mass media on current political, social, economic, scientific, or religious topics, lectures, addresses, and other works of the same nature, which are delivered in public and will only be used for information purposes.
- The reproduction and communication to the public of literary, scientific, or artistic works for reporting current events.
- The inclusion of a work in a publication, broadcast, or other forms of communication, if it will be used as aids in teaching and if it is compatible with fair use. Also, the author and the name of the author shall be mentioned.
- The recording of a work made in educational institutions for the use of that education institution. In accordance to this, the recording should be deleted after the first broadcast. Also, the said recording should not be from works which are part of a film except for brief excerpts of the work.
- The making of recordings by a broadcast organization for its own broadcasting purposes.
- The use of a work under the direction or control of the government or other institutions for the purpose of informing and public. It must also be compatible with fair use.
- The public performance of a work in a place without admission fee and for other purposes that does not include profit making.
- The public display of a work not made on screen or by other devices.
- The use of a work for judicial proceedings or for legal advice.

The provisions under this shall not be interpreted in a way that exploit the works and does not harm the interest of the right holder.

=== Fair use ===
A fair use, in its most general sense, is the act of copying of copyrighted materials done for purposes such as commenting, criticizing, or parodying a copyrighted work without the permission from the copyright owner. It is used as a defense under copyright infringement.

=== Factors in determining fair use ===
Under fair use, the use of a copyrighted work for purposes of criticizing, commenting, news reporting, teaching, creating researches, and other similar purposes is not an infringement of copyright. In determining whether the use made is under fair use, the following factors should be considered:

- The purpose of the use, including it is of a commercial nature or for non-profit purposes
- The nature of the copyrighted work
- The amount and sustainability of the portion used in relation to the copyrighted work as a whole
- The effect of the use to the value of the copyrighted work

=== List of reproductions allowed ===
Given the mentioned rules and regulations above about copyright, reproduction of different materials, without the permission of the author, are still allowed given that they are done for reasons allowed by the Intellectual Property Code of the Philippines. Provided here are the reproductions and purposes allowed by the law.

==== Reproduction of published work ====
Under Subsection 187.1 of the Intellectual Property Code of the Philippines, the reproduction of a published work shall be permitted without the owner's authorization given that the reproduction was made for research purposes. The permission granted here shall not extend to:

- A work of architecture in the form of building or other construction
- An entire or a substantial part of a book or of a musical work
- A compilation of data and other materials
- A computed program except those stated in Section 189
- Any reproduction that would exploit the work

==== Reprographic reproduction by libraries ====
Any library or archive with non-profit purposes may make a single copy of the work without the authorization of the author given that:

- The work cannot be lent to user in its original form
- The works are isolated articles contained in composite works or portions of other published works and the reproduction can supply them
- The making of a copy is for the purposes of preserving or replacing the original in situations that it is destroyed or lost

==== Reproduction of computer program ====
The reproduction of one back-up copy of a computer program shall be allowed without the permission of the copyright owner given that the reproduction is for the following uses:

- The use of the computer program in a computer for which it will be run
- To create a copy of the original computer program so that replacement is available if the original copy is lost or destroyed

=== Freedom of panorama ===
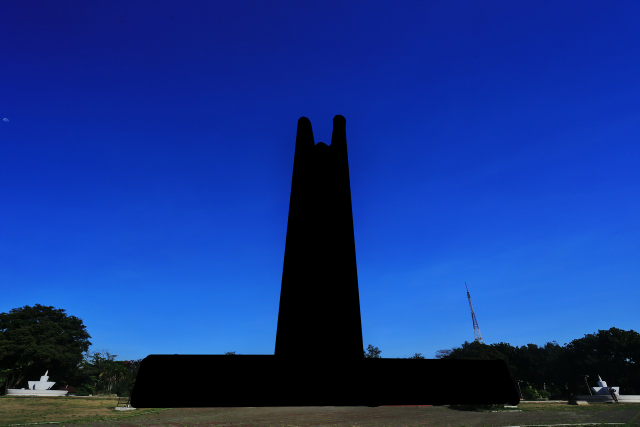
Censored image of Federico Ilustre's Quezon Memorial Shrine, as a result of the absence of FoP exception in the Philippines

The Intellectual property Code of the Philippines (Republic Act No. 8923) makes no specific provision for freedom of panorama. A very limited provision does exists at Section 184(d) which states "the reproduction and communication to the public of literary, scientific or artistic works as part of reports of current events by means of photography, cinematography or broadcasting to the extent necessary for the purpose."

This makes commercial uses of public buildings and monuments potentially infringing the copyrights subsisting in the said works; for example, shooting a video of a public space with a building authored by an architect who is a National Artist, and selling the said video to Netflix.

In the 19th Congress of the Philippines, Representative Christopher de Venecia of Pangasinan filed House Bill No. 2672. It included a freedom of panorama as the new Section 184(m) of the Intellectual Property Code. Senator Loren Legarda filed a similar bill with freedom of panorama provision in the Senate during the same Congress. Both bills remained pending up to the end of the Congress.

== History ==
The first known intellectual property law in the Philippines was the Spanish Law on Intellectual Property, which became effective in 1880. The Treaty of Paris which gave the Philippines to the United States has a mention on intellectual property rights: "The rights of property secured by copyrights and patents acquired by Spaniards in the Island of Cuba and in Porto Rico, the Philippines and other ceded territories, at the time of the exchange of the ratifications of this treaty, shall continue to be respected...." In 1924, Act No. 3134 (or An Act to Protect Intellectual Property), based on the Copyright Act of 1909 of the United States, came into force. This was superseded by Presidential Decree No. 49 during the regime of President Ferdinand Marcos. The current copyright law, Republic Act No. 8293 (Intellectual Property Code of the Philippines), was passed in 1998.

The Philippines was removed from Special 301 Report of the United States Trade Representative (USTR) in 2014, citing "significant legislative and regulatory reforms" in the area of intellectual property. The country began to be listed in 1989 and from 1994 was annually included in the piracy watchlist. The removal was seen as an important factor in boosting investor confidence. As of April 2023 the Philippines remains off the watchlist. Copyright registrations reached an all-time high of 6,522 in 2023, according to the Intellectual Property Office, eclipsing the registration figures that were seen before the COVID-19 pandemic, with the agency citing increased public awareness of the intellectual property.

== Recent developments ==
=== Philippine copyright issues ===
Former Senator Manny Villar in his 2011 press statement called for amending the Intellectual Property Code, as he expressed concerns that the artists were not sufficiently protected, citing a 2001 copyright complaint filed by a music publisher against Freddie Aguilar over Anak which he himself originally composed. Villar also opined that Levi Celerio would not have died poor had his works like Ang Pasko ay Sumapit were given protection earlier.

IPOPHL Director General Rowel Barba warned in 2022 that simply citing "CTTO" or "Credits to the Owner" as attribution for the author of a work of art featured in a meme or film clip violates the copyright law. He emphasized that it is still recommended to seek permissions from the authors of the paintings, photographs, essays, poems, or articles before reusing them in memes or clips. Mario Cerilles Jr. of Cerilles and Fernan Intellectual Property Law opined in 2023 that content creators who slap phrases like "CTTO" or even "no copyright infringement intended" onto their content may avoid plagiarism claims, but not copyright infringement claims. While creators may invoke fair use as a defense against copyright infringement, its success depends on the circumstances of the work's use. According to Cerilles, fair use claim may be more likely to succeed if the creator did not profit from their video and used only a small part of a copyrighted song, rather than the entirety of it.

=== Amendments to the copyright law ===
The Philippine Senate Committee on Trade, Commerce and Entrepreneurship's Senate Bill Nos. 2150 and 2385 aim to amend the 27-year old IP Code by enabling online site blocking to protect intellectual property rights against online piracy. Various stakeholders, including CitizenWatch Philippines, Stratbase ADR Institute, BK3 (Bantay Konsyumer, Kalsada, Kuryente), Viva Communications, Globe Telecom, and various Filipino entertainers like Edu Manzano and Shaina Magdayao, supported the proposed site blocking provision and called for its immediate passage.

In July 2024, Barba and Secretary Alfredo E. Pascual submitted proposed amendments to modernize the IP Code, Republic Act 8293. The revisions include measures to combat online piracy, the authority for a site-blocking order, increase in penalties, copyright infringement enforcements and changes to trademark regulations.

In November 2025, the International Intellectual Property Alliance (IIPA), based in the United States, told the Office of the United States Trade Representative to engage with the Philippine government concerning "problematic" amendment bills in the legislature that they claimed may "erode the country's copyright protection", specifically the extended collective licensing mechanism and vague language on the mandatory accreditation of the collective management organizations with the IPOPHL. IIPA also suggested extending the copyright duration to 70 years (from current 50 years) and replacing the "open-ended" fair use system with the "closed-list" fair dealing system.

The House of Representatives passed House Bill 11616 on November 11, 2026 on its second reading. The bill empowers IPOPHL to block online platforms "primarily engaged in or facilitating copyright infringement" with due notice and hearing, and mandates the internet service providers to comply with the administrative blocking orders within the 48-hour timeframe.

== Notable cases ==
=== Cases resulting to actions ===
==== La Concepcion College vs. Catabijan ====
Author and publisher Raymund Sta. Maria Catabijan was issued 608,450.00 pesos in damages from La Concepcion College, who he claimed directly copied his work books in order to sell to students. La Concepcion College was found guilty of copyright infringement by the Intellectual Property Office of the Philippines (IPOPHL). The non-sectarian school was hence banned from publishing, selling and distributing copies of Mr. Catabijan's works.

==== EdCrisch and Alkem vs. UPFA ====
The Makati Regional Trial Court ruled on November 17, 2020, that EdCrisch International Inc. (EdCrisch) copied a substantial part of Panahon Kasaysayan at Lipunan: Kasaysayan ng Pilipinas textbook, published by the University Press of First Asia (UPFA), for their textbook Pilipinas: Isang Sulyap at Pagyakap. EdCrisch and its Singaporean partner Alkem Company were both mandated by the court to cease production and distributions of the infringing textbook. The court also awarded UPFA ₱9.3 million in damages to be paid by both EdCrisch and Alkem, bringing the 11-year copyright dispute to an end.

==== FILSCAP vs. Anrey ====
The Supreme Court of the Philippines ruled, on August 11, 2022, that Anrey, Inc. must pay ₱10,000 worth of temperate damages to the Filipino Society of Composers, Authors and Publishers, Inc. (FILSCAP) and ₱50,000.00 worth of attorney's fees, all subject to varying interest rates: 12% per year "from September 8, 2009 until June 30, 2013," 6% per year "from July 1, 2013 until finality of the Court's judgment," and 6% per year from the judgment finality "until fully satisfied." The case was in response to the unlicensed use of copyrighted songs from FILSCAP's repertoire in two restaurants in Baguio owned by Anrey, Inc. in 2008. Anrey, Inc. responded to FILSCAP's letters of request to secure proper licensing by claiming their restaurants were playing "whatever was being broadcasted on the radio they were tuned in." Granting FILSCAP's petition for review on certiorari, the Supreme Court reversed the ruling of Branch 6 of Baguio Regional Trial Court dismissing FILSCAP's complaint as well as the Court of Appeals ruling that upheld the regional trial court's decision.

According to the high court, "the act of playing radio broadcasts containing copyrighted music through the use of loudspeakers (radio-over-loudspeakers) is, in itself, a performance." It added, it does not fall under fair use as the restaurants' manner of use of loudspeakers in transmitting musical content from radio is commercial. The Supreme Court stated that this decision "will also affect other uses in similar establishments like malls, department stores, retail stores, lounges and the like"; an opinion piece by Inquirer.net adds other establishments like hotels, cinemas, office spaces, salons, gymnasiums, and dance clubs, as well as concerts and events. However, the high court stressed that denying FILSCAP's petition would cause great harm to the economic rights of the copyright holders in which the users "use free radio reception" instead of paying royalties. By setting up a precedence for the proper use of copyrighted music, the Court said that this will create "a huge economic impact on the music industry in general."

==== FILSCAP vs. COSAC ====
The Supreme Court once again ruled in favor of FILSCAP in another copyright case, in a February 28, 2023 decision. COSAC, Inc., operator of Off the Grill Bar and Restaurant in Quezon City and the erring user, was to pay ₱300,000 worth of unpaid licensing and royalty fees to FILSCAP, inclusive of "12 percent interest per year from February 13, 2006 until June 30, 2013, and at the rate of 6 percent per year from July 1, 2013 until the date of finality of the judgment on the amount." This was a result of the restaurant found by FILSCAP representatives to have played copyrighted music between February 3, 2005 and January 13, 2006, which according to the Court "was not done privately, and the establishment is not a charitable or religious institution or society." The restaurant's distribution of music was also commercial, giving harm to the legitimate interests of the copyright holders, and therefore no longer protected by fair use doctrine.

=== Cases resulting to dismissals ===
==== ABS-CBN vs. Willing Willie ====
ABS-CBN demanded 127 million pesos from their former reality show star, Willie Revillame, citing copyright infringement due to stark similarities in Revillame's show, Willing Willie, and ABS CBN's Wowowee. ABS-CBN listed 5 acts of plagiarism allegedly committed by Willing Willie in their complaint as follows:

1. Willing Willie's opening song and dance number was similar to that of Wowowee's
2. “BIGA-Ten” and “Big Time Ka,” both segments from the shows involved, bear similar names.
3. “Willie of Fortune” and “Willtime Bigtime” are segments from both shows which resemble each other. ABS-CBN claimed that Willtime Bigtime resembled its show as it also showcases contestants relaying their personal stories before proceeding to play a singing/trivia game.
4. April “Congratulations” Gustilo is one of several backup dancers from Wowowee who also appear in Willing Willie.
5. Other striking similarities ABS-CBN claimed are found in Willing Willie's set design, stage, studio viewers' seats lay-out, lighting angles and camera angles.

A 25-page ruling later on dated May 22, 2015, junked the case against Revillame, declaring it moot. After the Quezon City RTC demanded a 400 million peso bond from Revillame to answer any further damage the network might sustain, it was later discharged. Revillame signed a contract with GMA network two days prior to the ruling, to work on a new show entitled, “Wowowin."

==== Dating show alleged copyright infringement ====
BJ Productions, Inc, produced a dating game show Rhoda and Me which aired from 1970 to 1977. On July 14, 1991, Francisco Joaquin, Jr., president of BJPI, saw on RPN Channel 9 an episode of It's a Date, produced by IXL Productions, Inc. (IXL) with similar format of his dating show. Joaquin filed a case against IXL Productions, headed by Gabriel Zosa and RPN 9 before Regional Trial Court of Quezon City. Meanwhile, Zosa sought a review of the resolution of the Assistant City Prosecutor before the Secretary of Justice Franklin Drilon. On August 12, 1992, Drilon reversed the Assistant City Prosecutor's findings and directed him to move for the dismissal of the case against private respondents. Joaquin filed a motion for reconsideration, but his motion denied by Drilon on December 3, 1992.

The Supreme Court ruled on January 28, 1999, that the format or mechanics of a television show is not included in the list of the protected work provided by Presidential Decree no. 49 and Republic Act No. 8293. It further state that copyright, in the strict sense of the term, is purely a statutory right and does not extend to an idea, procedure, process, system, method or operation, concept, principles or discovery regardless of the form to which it is described, explained, and illustrated or embodied in the work.

==== Pearl & Dean Philippines vs. Shoemart ====
Pearl & Dean Philippines is an out-of-home advertising company. In 1985, Pearl and Dean negotiated with Shoemart, Inc. (now SM Prime Holdings) for the lease and installation of lightboxes (two-sided structures lit by fluorescent lighting often used for advertising and store/mall directories) in SM Makati and SM Cubao. Only SM Makati was signed but later rescinded by Pearl & Dean due to non-performance of their terms. Years later, Pearl & Dean found out that exact copies of its light boxes were installed at different SM stores. It was further discovered that SM's sister company North Edsa Marketing Inc. (NEMI), sold advertising space in lighted display units located in SM's different branches.

Pearl & Dean filed this instant case for infringement of trademark and copyright, unfair competition and damages. SM on its part maintained that it independently developed its poster panels using commonly known techniques and available technology, without notice of or reference to Pearl and Dean's copyright. Makati Regional Trial Court decided in favor of Pearl & Dean, finding SM and NEMI jointly and severally liable for infringement of copyright and infringement of trademark. On appeal, however, the Court of Appeals reversed the trial court. On August 15, 2003, Supreme Court strengthened the Court of Appeals' decision by stating Pearl & Dean never secured a patent for the light boxes and the copyright patent is on its technical drawings within the category of "pictorial illustrations." It applied the similar ruling of G.R. No. 108946 (Joaquin, Jr. v. Drilon).

==== 2016 ruling requiring evidence over suspicion ====
On G.R. No. 195835, penned March 14, 2016, the Supreme Court ruled that For a claim of copyright infringement to prevail, the evidence on record must demonstrate: (1) ownership of a validly copyrighted material by the complainant; and (2) infringement of the copyright by the respondent. It further stated that probable cause is not imputable against the respondent.

The ruling stemmed from a dispute between LEC Steel Manufacturing Corporation and Metrotech Steel Industries where the former accused the latter infringing its intellectual property rights. The LEC failed to substantiate the alleged reproduction of the drawings/sketches of hatch doors it copyrighted had had no proof that the Metrotech reprinted the copyrighted sketches/drawings of LEC's hatch doors. The raid conducted by the NBI on Metrotech's premises yielded no copies or reproduction of LEC's copyrighted sketches/drawings of hatch doors. What were discovered instead were finished and unfinished hatch doors.

=== Cases resulting to mixed rulings ===
==== St. Mary's vs. Chinese firm and local partners ====
Fujian New Technology Color Making and Printing Co. Ltd., based in China, and its local partners M.Y. Intercontinental Trading Corporation (MITC) and Allianz Marketing and Publishing Corporation, were ordered to pay ₱24,695,830 worth of damages to St. Mary's Publishing Corporation (SMPC). This stemmed from Fujian's failure to abide by their contract with SMPC to deliver promised textbooks that they printed. The Chinese printing firm instead gave the marketing contract to MITC, with Allianz as the importer. The erring parties were also ordered to stop publications, importations, and distributions of textbooks, inclusive of revised versions. This landmark decision was ruled by Manila City Regional Trial Court Branch 24 on December 8, 2017; the Court of Appeals of the Philippines upheld the decision on April 11, 2019. The latter court said that while Fujian is a foreign company, "its act constitute copyright infringement pursuant to the Berne Convention for the Protection of Literary and Artistic Works," of which the Philippines and China are signatories.

The Supreme Court upheld the lower courts' decisions in favor of St. Mary's concerning the nature of the contract, although they granted the right for counterclaims of M.Y. Intercontinental, one of the two Filipino respondents, due to the defaulted obligations of St. Mary's. The Court remanded the case back to the Manila Regional Trial Court "to determine the propriety of the compulsory counterclaims of M.Y. Intercontinental".
