= Cannabis in the Philippines =

- Location of the Philippines (green)
- Medicinal: Illegal
- Recreational: Illegal
- Hemp: Illegal

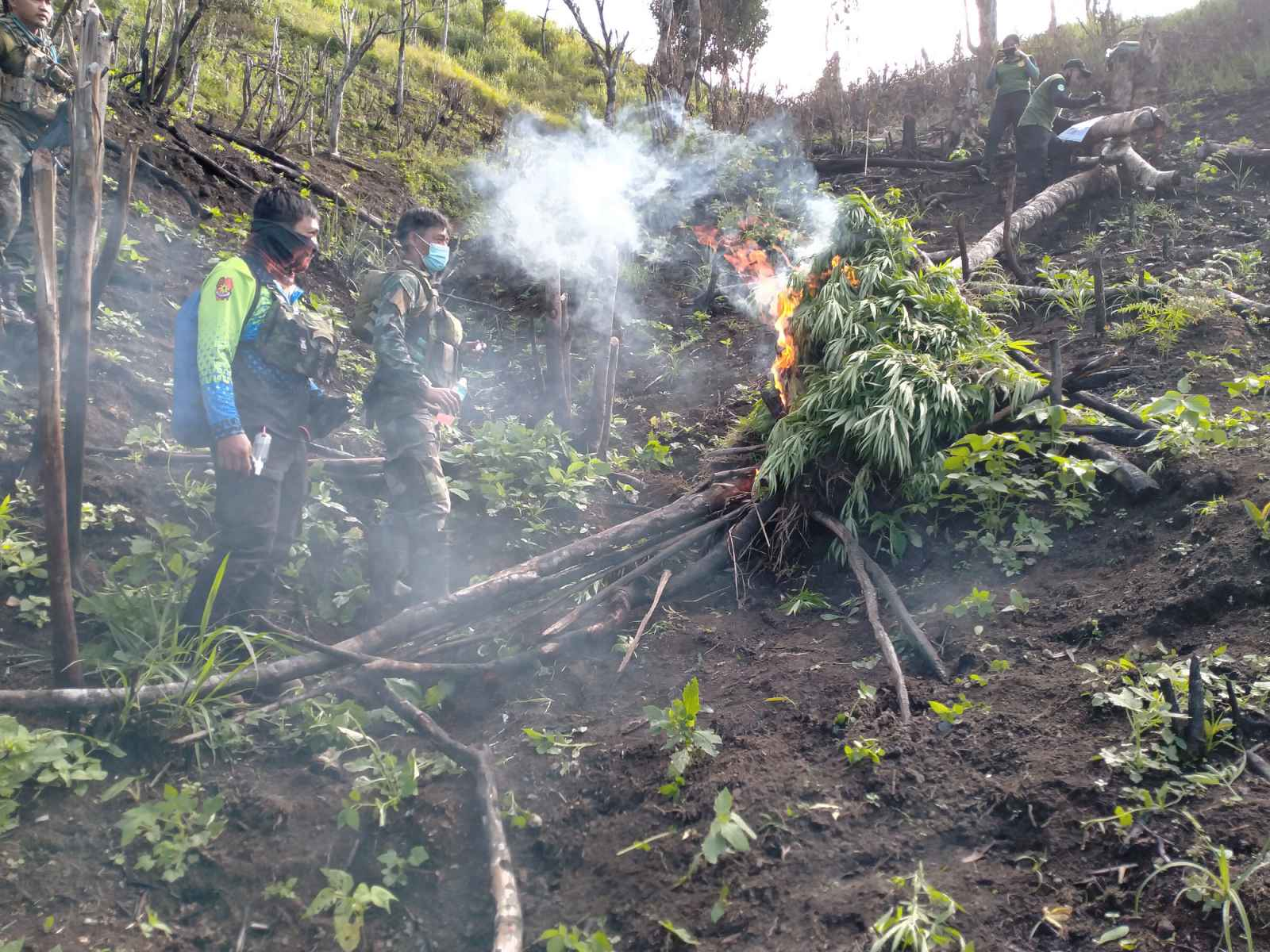
Seized cannabis plants being burned in Tinglayan, Kalinga

The cultivation and use of cannabis is illegal in the Philippines under Republic Act 9165 or the Comprehensive Dangerous Drugs Act of 2002. As the Philippines is a signatory to the 1961 United Nations Single Convention on Narcotic Drugs, Cannabis is classified as a Schedule I drug, which limits its use to medical and scientific purposes. Marijuana is the second most used drug in the Philippines, after shabu (methamphetamine), and most cultivation in the country is for local consumption. Cannabis is cultivated mostly in the remote, mountainous regions of Luzon and Mindanao.

== Legality ==
A 2014 poster from the Dangerous Drugs Board campaigning against cannabis legalization

Cannabis has been illegal in the Philippines since 1972 by virtue of Republic Act No. 6425, or the Dangerous Drugs Act of 1972. RA6425 classified marijuana as a prohibited drug, and detailed out punishments for the importation, sale, manufacture, cultivation, possession, and use of the drug, as well as possession of any drug-related paraphernalia. RA6425 also created the Dangerous Drugs Board, giving it jurisdiction over drug-related cases. In 2002, the Comprehensive Dangerous Drugs Act of 2002 was signed, repealing RA6425. RA9165 also enabled the creation of the Philippine Drug Enforcement Agency, which handles the implementation and enforcement of policies and strategies made by the Dangerous Drugs Board.

Under the current law, the importation, sale, maintenance of a den, dive or resort, manufacture, use, and cultivation of marijuana and marijuana-related products shall be met with life imprisonment and a fine.

While cannabis remains widely illegal including medical use, individuals with serious or terminal illness may apply for special permit from Food and Drugs Authority for drugs unregistered in the Philippines including those containing cannabis. Since issuance of permits began in 1992, only one application has been filed to seek consent to use cannabis oil as of December 2018.

== Statistics ==
In 2015, the Dangerous Drugs Board estimated, based on admission data in drug rehabilitation centers, that around 25% of center clients use marijuana.

Arrests for marijuana have been steady in recent years. In 2016, the PDEA eradicated a total of 337 marijuana sites. In the first seven months of 2015, PDEA reported conducting 22 successful cannabis eradication operations, resulting in the destruction of 117 growing sites and the seizure of cannabis valued at approximately US$3.5 million. That same year PDEA eradicated a total of 286 marijuana sites. In 2014, the PDEA reported that 8.9% of all drug seizures they made that year involved marijuana, and that they eradicated a total of 506 growing sites, the largest in recent years.

== Reform ==
A pro-medical marijuana NGO called the Philippine Organization for the Reform of Marijuana Laws (PORMAL) seeks to challenge the law in order to legalize its use, however there is opposition from both the Philippine Drug Enforcement Agency and senators like Vicente Sotto III. The PDEA claims that marijuana is a gateway drug that can lead to the abuse of harder substances. Senator Sotto has asked PORMAL to submit empirical evidence on the benefits of marijuana use.

== Medical use ==
On May 26, 2014, Isabela representative Rodolfo Albano III introduced House Bill No. 4477, known as the Compassionate Use of Medical Cannabis Act to the 16th Congress of the Philippines, which would legalize the use of medical marijuana. The Inquirer describes this bill as a "hotly-debated topic." This bill was filed in the Philippine Congress to legalize the use of medical marijuana in 2014. One of the bill's co-authors, Leah Paquiz, said "We are at this stage, we have Filipinos who need care, we should give them compassionate care - this medical cannabis. There are a lot of medicines, but they are expensive." The bill was, however, ultimately not passed during the 16th Congress. Albano has filed the bill during the 17th Congress of the Philippines.

Former President Rodrigo Duterte said during his election campaign that he supported medical marijuana, but that he would leave any decision to the concerned government department.

In 2022, Senator Robin Padilla filed a bill legalizing medical use of cannabis drugs. However there were concerns among some senators that there is a lack of safeguard against unauthorized cultivation of marijuana.

Cannahopefuls is a group in the Philippines that advocates medical use of cannabis. They believe that the process of acquiring compassionate use permit for medical marijuana is prohibitively tedious and expensive.
