= Katipunan ng Nagkakaisang Pilipino =

Pro-Youth political party in the Philippines

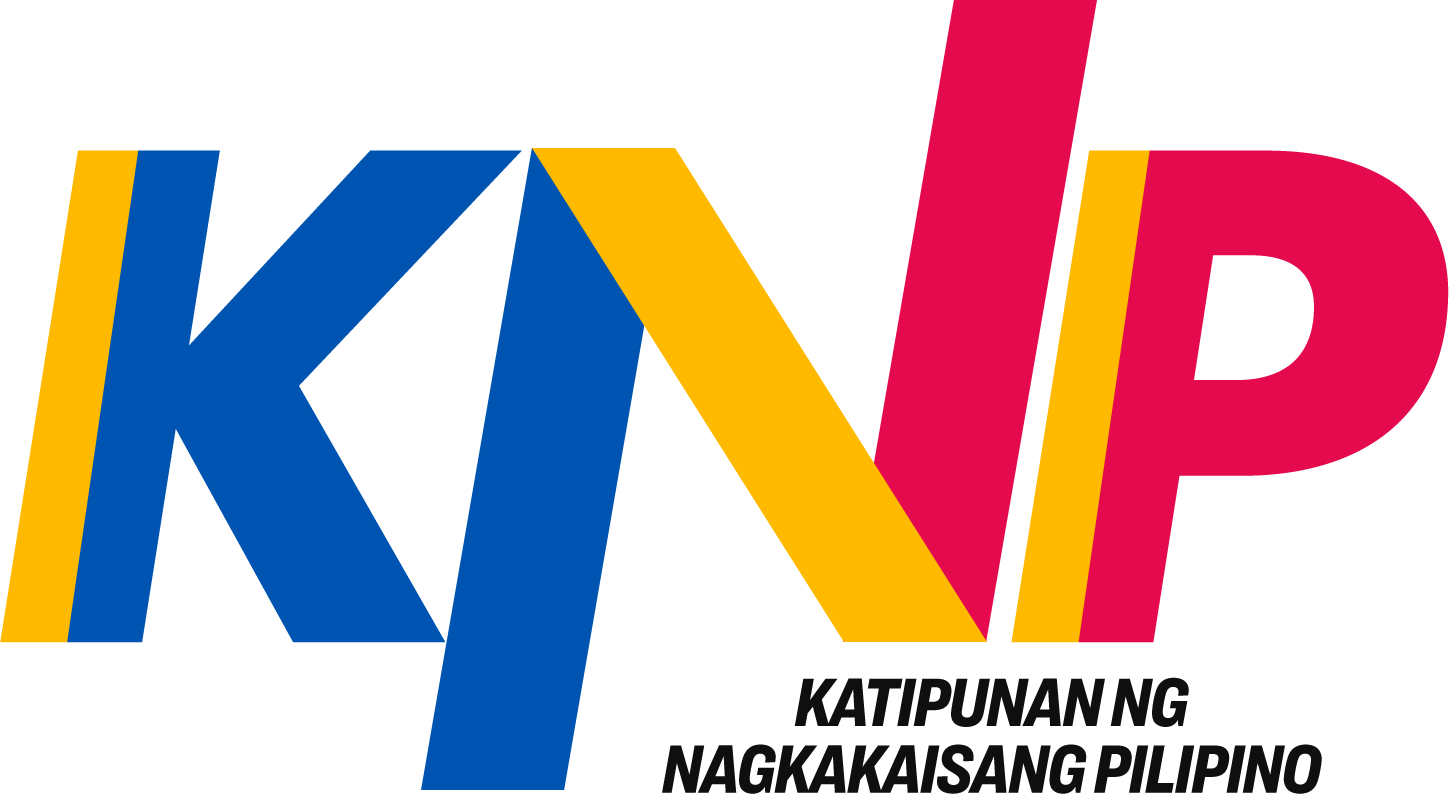
- Abbreviation: KNP; KANP (Note: Used for consistency in Wikipedia, because KNP is used as abbreviation by the defunct Koalisyon ng Nagkakaisang Pilipino.)
- President: Kerby Salazar
- Chairperson: Bam Aquino
- Founder: Kerby Salazar
- Founded: June 19, 2020
- Headquarters: Quezon City, Philippines
- Ideology: Youth empowerment Liberalism
- Political position: Centre
- National affiliation: KiBam (since 2025); TRoPa (2022)
- Colors: Pink; Blue; Teal
- Slogan: Pilipinas Para Sa Lahat ('Philippines For All')
- Senate: 1 / 24
- House of Representatives: 0 / 317
- Provincial Governors: 0 / 82
- Provincial Vice Governors: 0 / 82
- Provincial board members: 7 / 840

Website
- kanp.ph

The Katipunan ng Nagkakaisang Pilipino (KNP or KANP, lit. 'Society of United Filipinos') is a political party in the Philippines. The party was founded on June 19, 2020, by Kerby Salazar, a provincial board member from Cavite, to be a platform for youth empowerment in the national government.

== History ==
In October 2021, KANP welcomed lawyer Chel Diokno as its party member and senatorial candidate for the upcoming 2022 Philippine general elections. The party also adopted presidential aspirant Vice President Leni Robredo, vice presidential aspirant Senator Kiko Pangilinan, and senatorial aspirant and former Congressman Teddy Baguilat as their national candidates.

In May 2024, former senator Bam Aquino announced he had assumed the role of KANP's party chairman after leaving the Liberal Party. He has also stated his intention to run in the 2025 Senate elections. As the chairman of KANP, he formed a coalition with his former party to form a coalition duo with his former Senate colleague Pangilinan.

== Organization and structure ==
=== Party officers ===
- Chairperson: Bam Aquino (2024–present)
- President: Kerby Javier Salazar (2020–present)
- Executive Vice President: Maybelyn Fernandez (2020–present)
- Treasurer: Bernadeth Olivares (2020–present)

== Electoral performance ==
=== Presidential elections ===
Year	Presidential election			Vice presidential election		
Year	Candidate	Vote share	Result	Candidate	Vote share	Result
2022	none (Note: Endorsed Leni Robredo (Independent/Liberal) who received 27.94% of the vote and lost.)			none (Note: Endorsed Kiko Pangilinan (Liberal) who received 17.82% of the vote and lost.)		

=== Legislative elections ===
Congress of the Philippines
House					Senate				
Year	Seats won	Votes	%	Result	Year	Seats won	Votes	%	Result
2022	0 / 316	4,370	0.01	Lost	2022	0 / 12	9,978,444	2.31%	Lost
2025	0 / 317	134,137	0.27	Lost	2025	1 / 12	20,971,899	36.57%	Won

== List of officials ==
=== President ===
President	Term start	Term end
Kerby Salazar	2024	present

=== Chairman ===
Chairperson	Term start	Term end
Bam Aquino	2024	present

=== Members ===
- Former Senator TG Guingona (2010–2016)
- Former Caloocan City Mayor Rey Malonzo (1995–2004)
- Former Vigan City Mayor Carlo Medina (2016–2022)
- Infanta, Quezon Mayor L.A. Ruanto (2025–present)
- Pililla, Rizal Mayor John Masinsin (2025–present)
- Laguna 1st District Board Member Bernadeth Oliveros (2025–present)
- Cotabato 2nd District Board Member Krista Piñol-Solis (2019–present)
- Biñan, Laguna Vice-Mayor Dada Reyes (2022–present)
- Dagupan City Councilor Michael Fernandez (2019–present)
- Lucena City Councilor Sunshine Abcede (2013–2022; 2025–present)
