= Bong Revilla =

Filipino actor and politician (born 1966)

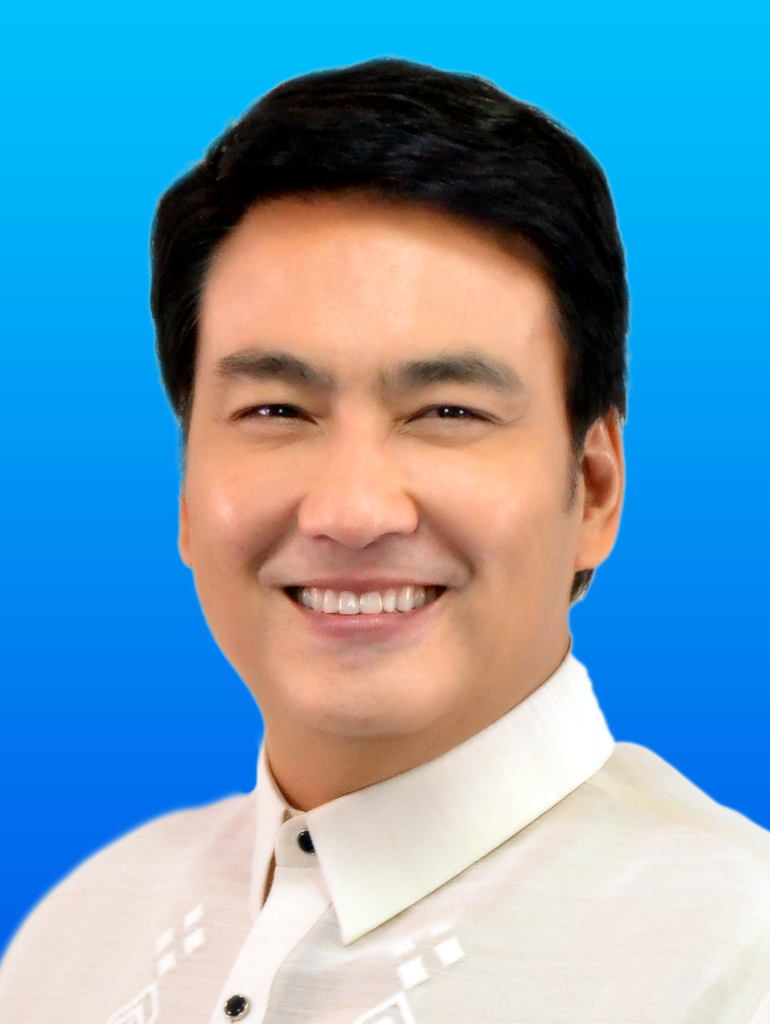
- Portrait of Bong Revilla as member of the Commission on Appointments

Senator of the Philippines
- In office June 30, 2019 – June 30, 2025
- In office June 30, 2004 – June 30, 2016

Chair of the Senate Public Works Committee
- In office July 25, 2022 – June 30, 2025
- Preceded by: Manny Pacquiao
- Succeeded by: Mark Villar

Chair of the Senate Civil Service, Government Reorganization and Professional Regulation Committee
- In office July 22, 2019 – June 30, 2025
- Preceded by: Antonio Trillanes
- Succeeded by: Ronald dela Rosa

Chair of the Senate Public Information and Mass Media Committee
- In office July 22, 2019 – June 30, 2022
- Preceded by: Grace Poe
- Succeeded by: Robin Padilla

Chairman of the Videogram Regulatory Board
- In office May 30, 2002 – February 10, 2004
- President: Gloria Macapagal Arroyo
- Preceded by: Manuel Mariano
- Succeeded by: Edu Manzano

33rd Governor of Cavite
- In office February 6, 1998 – June 30, 2001
- Vice Governor: Jonvic Remulla
- Preceded by: Epimaco Velasco
- Succeeded by: Ayong Maliksi

Vice Governor of Cavite
- In office June 30, 1995 – February 6, 1998
- Governor: Epimaco Velasco
- Preceded by: Danilo Lara
- Succeeded by: Jonvic Remulla

Personal details
- Born: Jose Mari Mortel Bautista; September 25, 1966 (age 60) Manila, Philippines
- Party: Lakas (1994–present)
- Spouse: Lani Mercado (m. 1986)
- Children: 7 legitimate (Note: Revilla has admitted to have an unspecified number of children outside of his marriage with Mercado.) (inc. Bryan and Jolo)
- Occupations: Actor; director; producer; television presenter; politician
- Years active: 1973–present (as an actor)
- Criminal information
- Status: Released on bail
- Criminal charge: Malversation of public funds
- Capture status: January 19, 2026
- Website: Official website

Ramon Bautista Bong Revilla Jr. (Note: In this legally-changed Philippine name, the middle name is Bautista and the surname is Bong Revilla.) (Tagalog: [rɛˈbiljɐ]; born Jose Mari Mortel Bautista; September 25, 1966) is a Filipino former actor and politician who served as a senator from 2004 to 2016 and again from 2019 to 2025.

The son of actor-politician Ramon Revilla Sr., he himself became an action star in the 1980s and 1990s as Ramon "Bong" Revilla Jr., starring in the Alyas Pogi film series as the titular policeman Henry Cruz. He started his political career in Cavite, serving as vice governor (1995–1998) and later governor (1998–2001). He was the chairman of the Videogram Regulatory Board (now the Optical Media Board) from 2002 to 2004.

Revilla was first elected to the Senate in 2004. He successfully ran for a second term and topped the senatorial race in 2010. His alleged involvement in the pork barrel scam led the Sandiganbayan to issue an arrest warrant against him and other co-accused on June 20, 2014. Within hours, Revilla surrendered before the anti-graft court.

Revilla was acquitted of plunder and released on December 7, 2018, but was required to return to the government ₱124.5 million (US$2.53 million) in civil liability. He stood accused of 16 counts of graft for his alleged role in the transfer of ₱517 million (US$10.5 million) of his discretionary funds to bogus foundations until all cases were dismissed by Sandiganbayan on 2021; however, he has yet to return the required amount he was asked to give back before his acquittal. He successfully ran for a third term in the Senate in 2019 and sought a re-election in 2025 but lost.

From January to July 2026, Revilla was detained over alleged involvement in anomalous flood control projects. Revilla however was released on bail amounting to ₱1 million.

== Early life and education ==
Bong Revilla was born as Jose Mari Mortel Bautista to actor Jose Acuña Bautista Sr. (1927–2020, known professionally as Ramon Revilla) and Azucena Mortel (1944–1998). He has over 70 siblings, with his father once claiming that the number is probably above 80. His six siblings are Marlon, Rowena, Rebecca ("Princess", born 1965), Strike (né Edwin, born 1970), Andrea (born 1975) and Diane, and among his half-siblings are Evelyn and Ramgen Jose ("Ram", 1988-2011).

In 1977, Bong Revilla finished his elementary education at Jesus Good Shepherd School in Palico II, Imus, Cavite. He finished his secondary education at Fairfax High School in Los Angeles, California, United States, in 1982. Ramon Revilla encouraged Bong Revilla to be a doctor, but the younger Revilla committed to pursuing his acting career.

== Acting career ==
Bong Revilla entered the showbiz industry in 1973. He debuted in the film Tiagong Akyat as a seven-year old child actor. It was produced by the Revilla family-owned Imus Production and starred his father Ramon Revilla and Aurora Salve.

In the early 1980s, Revilla as a 14-year old featured in the film Bianong Bulag which also starred his father and Charito Solis. The younger Revilla played the role of the young version of the titular protagonist. The father and son also acted in the 1983 film Dugong Buhay.

After Dugong Buhay's production was wrapped up, the elder Revilla introduced his son to Lolit Solis who has become Bong Revilla's talent manager ever since. Solis' first project for Bong Revilla was a work by Tower Productions.

Revilla starred in the 2012 Metro Manila Film Festival entry, Si Agimat, si Enteng Kabisote at si Ako.

Revilla's acting career was put on hiatus in 2014 due to being arrested on graft and plunder charges. He was acquitted five years later and re-elected as a Senator in the May 2019 election. Revilla returned to acting under GMA Network and was reportedly filming for the drama fantasy television series Agimat ng Agila in December 2019.

In April 2024, the filming for Birador: Alyas Pogi 4 with Revilla began. The upcoming media event will mark Revilla's return to acting in feature films.

== Political career ==
=== Vice-governor of Cavite (1995–1998) ===
In June 1994, Revilla became a member of the then-ruling party Lakas–NUCD, which drafted him to be their gubernatorial candidate in Cavite. According to him, it was President Fidel V. Ramos who first convinced him to enter politics and invited him to join the party. However, he was invited by National Bureau of Investigation director Epimaco Velasco, who also a Lakas member to be his running mate instead in the province. In the 1995 local elections, Velasco and Revilla won as governor and vice governor, beating the tandem of Johnny Remulla and Danilo Lara.

As vice governor, he chaired Cavite's Provincial Task Force Against Illegal Gambling named "Task Force Sugal na Bawal", Cavite Multi-Agency Anti-Drug Council, and Task Force Bantay Likas Yaman. His anti-drug efforts earned him recognition from the International Narcotics Enforcement Officers Association, Inc. He also founded the Ramon "Bong" Revilla Jr. Foundation Inc. and the RRJ People's Organization Inc., where he served as chairman and president and chairman, respectively.

=== Governor of Cavite (1998–2001) ===
In February 1998, Velasco resigned as governor of Cavite when he was appointed as Secretary of the Interior and Local Government, replacing then senatorial candidate Robert Barbers. Revilla then assumed the governorship of the province. In the May 1998 local elections, he won a full term for the position of governor.

As governor, Revilla also chaired various civic organizations such as the Cavite Clean and Green project, Region IV Peace and Order Council, Calabarzon Development Council, Cavite Provincial Peace and Order Council, Provincial Development Council, and the Cavite Provincial Tourism Council. He also founded Cavite Rescue 161, an emergency response unit of the province. During his term as governor, the Cavite Computer Center and the Cavite-Korea Friendship Hospital were established, while projects such as the Cavite Sports Complex and the Cavite Convention Center were commenced. The Proposed Conceptual Provincial Development Plan of Cavite, also called Vision 2020, was also furnished during this term.

He completed a Special Local Chief Executive Program on Local Governance at the Development Academy of the Philippines in Pasig in 1998. He was given the Lifetime Achievement Award by the National Press Club in 1998 and was named as Most Outstanding Governor of Gawad Papuri Awards in 1999 and Most Outstanding Governor of the Department of Health Sandugo National Program in 2000.

During the Second EDSA Revolution from January 16 to 20, 2001, Revilla's political career deteriorated when he called for the resignation of his godfather, President Joseph Estrada, who was impeached and removed from office due to graft and corruption charges, at the height of the protest. In his May 2001 reelection bid for governor, he was trounced by then-Representative Ayong Maliksi by a wide margin.

He returned to his acting career and became a TV actor on the GMA Network's sitcom Idol Ko si Kap.

=== Chair of the Videogram Regulatory Board (2002–2004) ===
In July 2002, President Gloria Macapagal Arroyo appointed Revilla as chair of the Videogram Regulatory Board (now Optical Media Board). Revilla launched a massive campaign against the rampant smuggling and selling of fake VCDs all over the country. The Board was able to conduct 3480 major operations including routine inspections throughout the Philippines which seized goods worth over ₱5 billion, convicted 21 optical disc pirates, 2 videotape pirates and 5 large-scale distributors and retailers. He was given a Plaque of International Recognition for Efforts Against Piracy by the Motion Picture Association of America on July 23, 2003, and the Huwarang Lingkod Bayan Award by the Consumers League of the Philippines Foundation, Inc. on October 25, 2003.

He also completed his course on Philippine Legislative Institutions and Processes at the Development Academy of the Philippines in November 2003.

=== Senator (2004–2016) ===
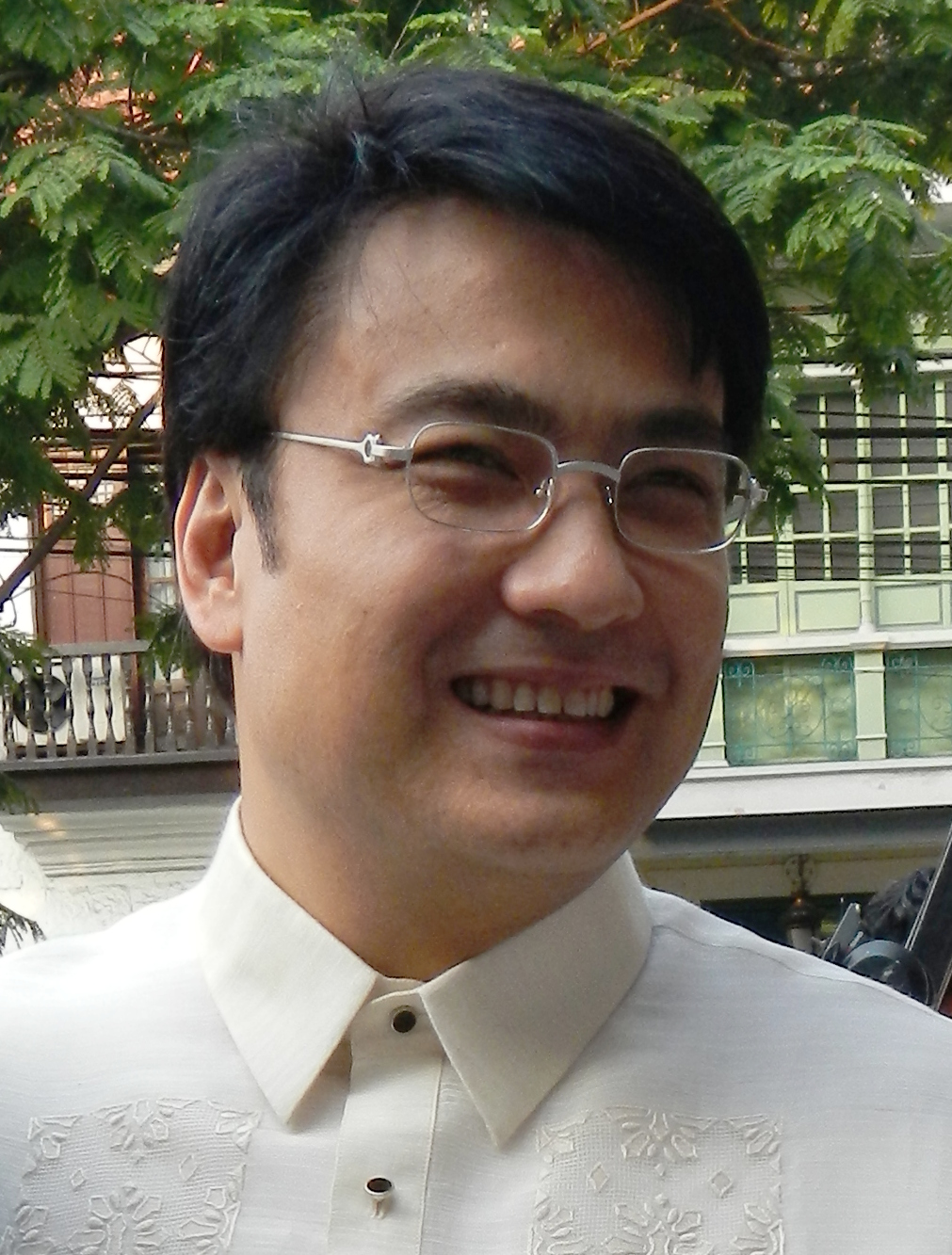
Bong Revilla in 2014

In February 2004, Revilla resigned as chair of the VRB and recommended Edu Manzano as his replacement. His father, Ramon Revilla Sr., ended his term as senator on June 30, 2004, upon being term-limited by the 1987 Philippine Constitution after serving two consecutive terms since 1992. He ran for the position of senator under the administration K-4 coalition. He won and received the second highest number of votes from the national electorate.

During the 14th Congress, Revilla was named as chair of the Senate Committees on Public Works and on Public Services, which he used to push his travel safety advocacy. He authored the Mandatory Helmet Act, which obliged all motorcycle riders, including back riders, to wear standard protective helmets to reduce motorcycle-related accidents in the country. Because of the said road safety measures, he was named Safety Ambassador both by the Land Transportation Office and Suzuki Philippines Inc. During the 15th Congress, he pursued policies on social justice, travel safety, lower taxes, community empowerment and infrastructure development. He also pushed for the passage of his separate bills that would grant wage increases for private sector and government employees.

He was reelected for a second consecutive term with the highest number of votes in 2010, serving until 2016. On May 29, 2012, Revilla was one of the 20 senator-judges who voted to convict Chief Justice Renato Corona.

=== Potential presidential bid ===
Despite the weakness of his party Lakas due to the arrest of former president and Pampanga 2nd district Representative Gloria Macapagal Arroyo, Revilla became chair of the party on February 5, 2013. He succeeded Albay 1st district Representative Edcel Lagman and was to potentially run as standard bearer of the party in the 2016 presidential election. On May 13, 2013, the day of the 2013 elections, the Cavite Philippine National Police and the National Bureau of Investigation raided the house of Revilla, and according to Revilla, he was harassed by the group of Senator Panfilo Lacson and former Governor Ayong Maliksi.

=== Senator (2019–2025) ===
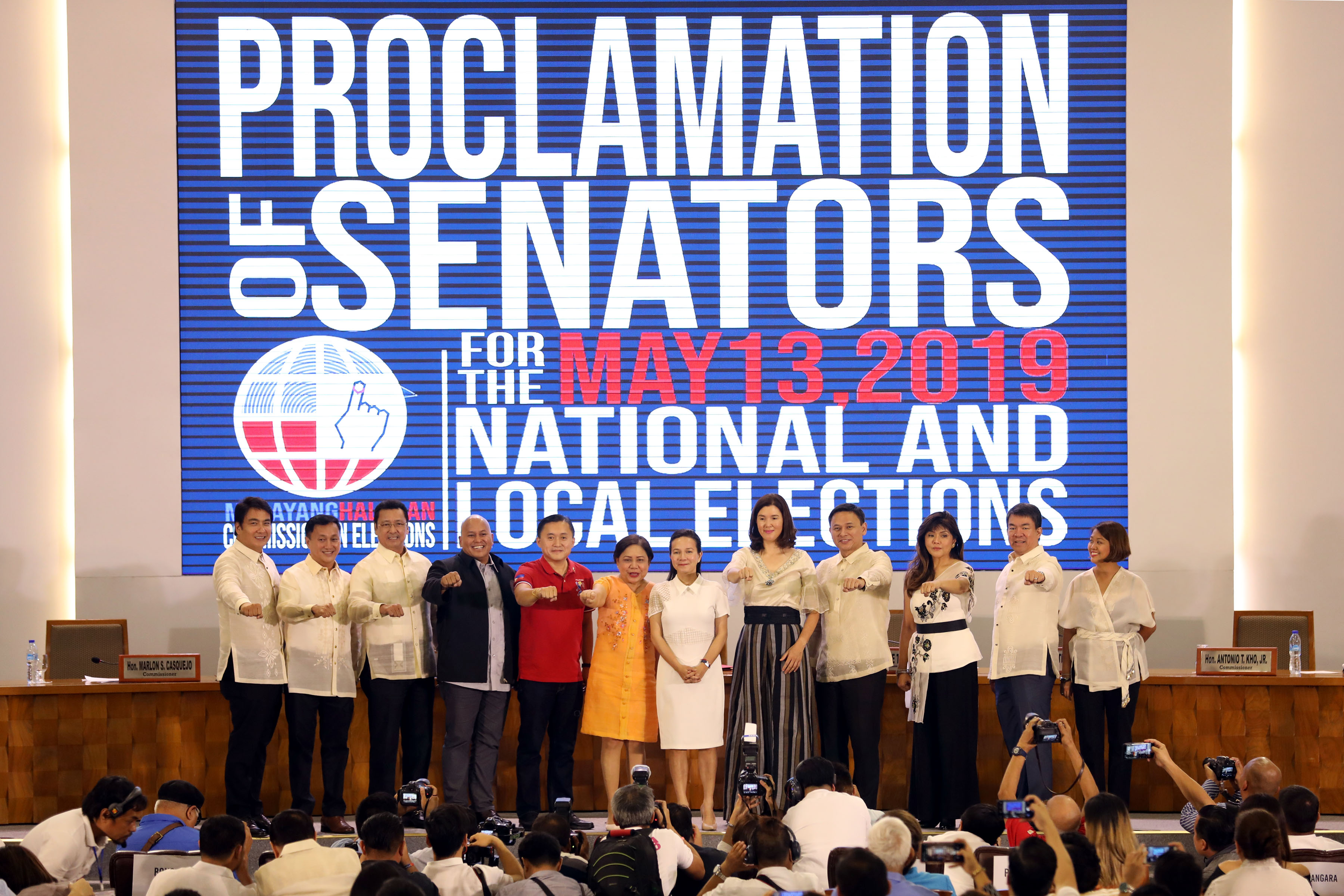
Revilla (1st from the left) during the proclamation of the winning twelve senators by the Commission on Elections on May 22, 2019.

In 2018, Revilla through his wife, then Bacoor Mayor Lani Mercado, filed his candidacy for senator for the 2019 elections, with the endorsement of Presidential Daughter and de facto First Lady Sara Duterte, who is the leader of the political coalition Hugpong ng Pagbabago in order to include him to her 14 (later 16)-candidate slate for the Senate election in May 2019, which was criticized by opposition coalition Tindig Pilipinas due to his involvement in the Priority Development Assistance Fund (PDAF) scam with Jinggoy Estrada. On December 7, 2018, the Sandiganbayan acquitted Revilla of plunder in the PDAF scam. He still faces charges of 16 counts of graft, for which he has posted ₱480,000 bail. His chief aide Richard Cambe and PDAF scam mastermind Janet Napoles were convicted.

As part of his campaign, Revilla released a campaign video that featured himself and a group of children and his son Jolo dancing to budots. Revilla described his decision to dance as part of his campaign as an "accident" and said he was encouraged by his son Jolo to do so. The campaign went viral. He was elected to the Senate, placing him eleventh in the 2019 elections. He credits his acquittal and the budots ad campaign for his successful election.

In September 2021, the Philippine Offshore Gaming Operator (POGO) Law, which regulated and legalized POGOs nationwide, was signed into law by President Duterte. Senator Revilla voted in favor of the controversial law that legalized gambling corporations known for illegal activities, ranging from tax evasions to harboring illegal Chinese nationals.

On November 17, 2021, he offered Davao City Mayor and 2022 vice presidential aspirant Sara Duterte the chairmanship of Lakas-CMD, which she later accepted, succeeding him. He later became one of the party's co-chairpersons. Revilla chaired the Senate Committee on Civil Service, Government Reorganization and Professional Regulation and the Senate Committee on Public Works.

In December 2022, Revilla sponsored a Senate bill proposing to lower the age by which senior citizen benefits can be enjoyed, from 60 to 56 years old. Revilla celebrated his 56th birthday in September of this year, which he marked with a month-long celebration, which included grocery, cash, and other giveaways.

On May 19, 2023, Revilla was reinstalled as chairman of Lakas–CMD, replacing Sara Duterte, who left the party earlier that day.

=== Failed reelection bid in 2025 ===
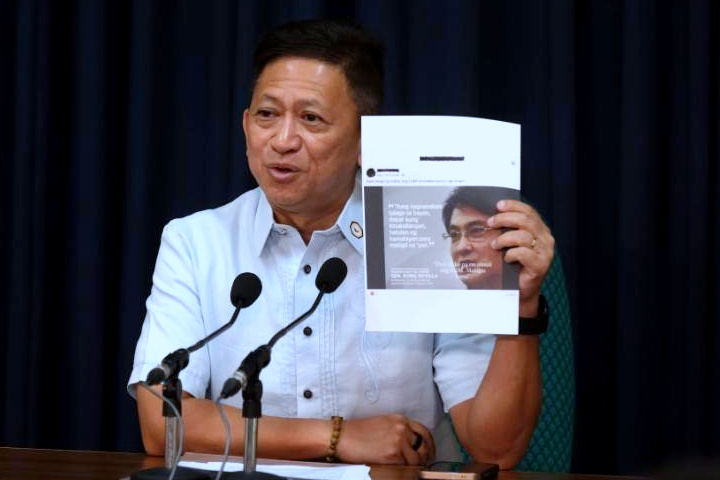
Raymond Fortun at the press coverage regarding the cyberlibel complaint filed by Revilla.

Revilla sought re-election in the 2025 Philippine Senate election under the Alyansa para sa Bagong Pilipinas coalition of President Bongbong Marcos. Dismissed by critics as Mr. Budots, Revilla says he had 343 passed bills and highlighted laws which benefited teachers, students, and senior citizens. He was endorsed by religious group Iglesia ni Cristo (INC).

Revilla lost, placing 14th in the official tally. He admitted to being sad about the loss and believes that misinformation around his PDAF case was the reason why he lost. With the support of his counsel, Raymond Fortun, Revilla plans to file cyberlibel charges against online content creators who mostly posted critical content against Revilla two weeks in the lead up to the election. The consistent position of content creators is that Revilla must return the ₱124.5 million funds to the national treasury, however Revilla's camp dispute this since he was not found to be criminally liable for plunder he is no longer required to return the funds. They cite Article 100 of the Revised Penal Code, which states that "every person criminally liable for a felony is also civilly liable."

== Controversies ==
=== Involvement in the pork barrel scam ===
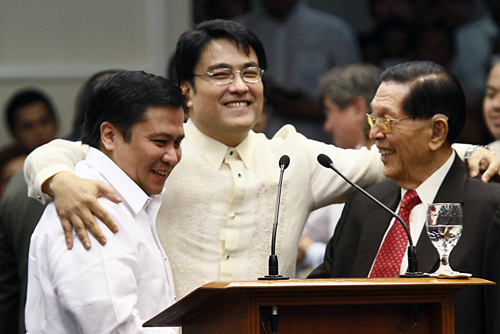
Revilla with then-Senators Juan Ponce Enrile and Jinggoy Estrada after the Revilla's speech Salamat, Kaibigan on June 9, 2014.

After the 2013 elections, he was allegedly involved in the Priority Development Assistance Fund scam, along with Senate President Juan Ponce Enrile and Senator Jinggoy Estrada, contributing to entrepreneur Janet Lim-Napoles' bogus foundations.

The Commission on Audit, in its two-year investigation released on August 16, 2013, reported on the questionable release of the Priority Development Assistance Fund by 12 senators, including Revilla, and 180 representatives of Congress. A month later, the National Bureau of Investigation filed plunder cases against Revilla, Enrile, and Estrada.

On January 20, 2014, in his privilege speech to the Senate, he criticized the Aquino administration, revealing that he was talked to by the President along with then-Transportation and Communications Secretary Mar Roxas and Budget Secretary Florencio "Butch" Abad to convince him to convict the Chief Justice, Renato Corona.

The Office of the Ombudsman, on April 1, 2014, found probable cause to indict Revilla, Enrile, Estrada, and Napoles with plunder, and filed plunder charges before the Sandiganbayan on June 6, 2014.

On June 9, 2014, Revilla delivered a second privilege speech entitled "Salamat, Kaibigan", as charges were filed against him in the Sandiganbayan. On June 20, the Sandiganbayan issued a warrant of arrest against Revilla and more than 30 others. Revilla proceeded to the Sandiganbayan to surrender, and he chose to be detained at the PNP Custodial Center at Camp Crame, Quezon City.

The Sandiganbayan suspended Revilla from public office and his senior aide Richard Cambe on August 4, 2014, for 90 days. Revilla's bank accounts were frozen in 2015 as a consequence of his alleged involvement in the scam.

His trial for plunder was rescheduled several times due to various motions filed by Revilla. The trial finally began on June 22, 2017.

=== Flood control corruption scandal ===
At the Senate Blue Ribbon Committee investigation into corruption in the government's infrastructure projects, Department of Public Works and Highways (DPWH) engineer Henry Alcantara linked Revilla to alleged budget insertions and kickbacks. According to Alcantara, there was a ₱300 million (US$6.09 million) budget insertion in 2024 for Revilla, covering three flood control projects in Plaridel, Bulacan. He claimed that the intended kickback rate for Revilla was increased from 25% to 30% on DPWH Undersecretary Roberto Bernardo's instructions. Alcantara had previously denied knowledge of the alleged corruption scheme involving DPWH flood control projects. His later testimony aligned with claims made by his subordinate, Brice Hernandez, about kickbacks directed to senators Joel Villanueva and Jinggoy Estrada and former senator Bong Revilla.

On September 25, 2025, former DPWH Undersecretary Roberto Bernardo testified about the involvement of Senator Francis Escudero and former senators Revilla and Nancy Binay with anomalous flood control projects. Bernardo stated that his allegations were based on personal knowledge and direct interactions with the involved parties.

In December 2025, the Independent Commission for Infrastructure recommended the filing of charges against Bong Revilla and the investigation of senators Chiz Escudero, Grace Poe, and Mark Villar, as well as former senator Nancy Binay. On January 19, 2026, Revilla surrendered to authorities following an arrest warrant issued by Sandiganbayan’s Third Division the previous night. He was subsequently detained at the New Quezon City Jail, beginning with a medical quarantine.

In April 6, 2026, he arrived at the Sandiganbayan Third Division to attend his first bail hearing. The alleged P92.8 million project in Pandi, Bulacan was declared 95% completed in 21 days. Revilla already posted a P90,000 bail for the graft charge, but he remains jailed since January since his malversation case is non-bailable. There was a witness who has shown the "95%" completed project but instead of an almost complete flood control project, the footage appeared to have shown a muddy riverside. A spokesperson, Bernardo said in 2024, he allegedly delivered P125 million to the residence of Revilla. Also, Bernardo’s aide allegedly delivered another P250 million to Revilla before the 2025 elections.

== Personal life ==
Ramon "Bong" Bautista Bong Revilla Jr. (after his 2009 legal name change) married Lani Mercado (Jesusa Victoria Hernandez-Bautista), an actress and incumbent representative of the 2nd district of Cavite that comprises only Bacoor, in a civil wedding in 1986. They have seven children, namely:

- Leonard Bryan Bautista (Bryan Revilla, born in November 1986), representative for Agimat Partylist
- Jose Lorenzo Bautista III (Ramon "Jolo" Revilla III, born in March 1988), representative from Cavite–1st, married to Angelica Alita
- Inah Felicia Bautista-Del Rosario (Inah Revilla, born in October 1989), married to Vince del Rosario
- Maria Alexandra Bautista (July 2, 1991 – July 28, 1991)
- Ma. Viktoria Gianna Bautista (born in August 1995), married to Jed Patricio.
- Ma. Franzel Loudette Bautista (born in October 1997)
- Ramon Vicente "Ramboy/RV" Bautista (Ram Revilla, born in December 1998), Cavite vice governor

In 2024, Revilla confirmed fathering illegitimate children but never revealed their names or their mothers. It was previously confirmed that Revilla had an affair with Lovely Guzman, a non-showbiz personality whom he had dated before marrying Mercado, and, together, they have one son named Luigi (born Francis Luigi Guzman in 1992). Guzman in 1999 later married Patrick Joseph Santos, who also legally adopted Luigi. Revilla's relationship with Guzman rekindled after he lost his daughter with Mercado, named Maria Alexandra, who died just 26 days after birth due to a heart condition caused by the use of contraceptives. Mercado chose to stay with him due to her love for him and their children.

Revilla is the fourth of the seven children of actor and former Philippine senator Ramon Revilla Sr. and Azucena Mortel Bautista. He is the younger brother of Marlon Bautista, a former nominee for 1-Pacman Party List, and the older brother of incumbent Bacoor mayor Strike Revilla and former Antipolo mayor Andrea Bautista-Ynares, who is married to former Rizal governor Casimiro Ynares III. He also has at least 32 paternal half-siblings, including actor Ram Revilla, who was murdered in 2011.

== Honors and awards ==
=== Entertainment awards ===
Year	Award-Giving Body	Category	Recipient	Result
2001	PMPC Star Awards for Television	Best Comedy Actor	Idol Ko si Kap	Won
2009	PMPC Star Awards for Television	Best Educational Program Host	Kap's Amazing Stories	Won
2009	Metro Manila Film Festival	Best Actor	Ang Panday	Won
2011	GMMSF Box-Office Entertainment Awards	Box-Office Kings (with Vic Sotto)	Si Agimat at Si Enteng Kabisote	Won

=== Honorary doctorates ===
Two universities have conferred Revilla with honorary doctorates:

- Cavite State University (2005, Doctor of Public Administration)
- Nueva Vizcaya State University (2006, Doctor of Humanities)

=== Other recognitions ===
- Adopted Son of Sablayan – Sablayan, Occidental Mindoro Resolution No. 2024-SDM335

== Filmography ==
=== Film ===
Year	Title	Role
1973	Tiagong Akyat	
1983	Dugong Buhay	Alvaro
1984	Pieta, Ang Ikalawang Aklat (Pieta, the Second Book)	Noel
1985	Sa Dibdib ng Sierra Madre	Manuel
1985	Celeste Gang	Mortemer Marcelo
1986	Beloy Montemayor	Beloy Montemayor
1986	Isa Lang ang Dapat Mabuhay	
1986	Anak ng Supremo	
1986	Masyong Bagwisa Jr.: Bodyguard	Masyong Bagwisa Jr.
1986	Agaw-Armas	Benjie
1986	Cordillera	Lt. Tuglao
1986	Sgt. Villapando: A.W.O.L.	Sgt. Villapando
1986	Boboy Tibayan: Tigre ng Cavite	Boboy Tibayan
1986	Payaso	
1987	Anak ng Lupa	Hector
1987	Target: Sparrow Unit	Cris
1987	Boy Tornado	Boy Tornado
1988	Dongalo Massacre	
1988	Lost Command	Lt. Roland Briones
1988	Alega Gang: Public Enemy No.1 of Cebu	Ulysses "Boboy" Alega
1988	Iyo ang Batas, Akin ang Katarungan	Dante Reyes
1988	Jockey T'yan	Ulysses "Boboy" Alega
1988	Chinatown: Sa Kuko ng Dragon	Daniel Moreno
1989	Florencio Diño: Public Enemy No. 1 of Caloocan	Florencio Diño
1989	Moises Platon	Moises Platon
1989	Isang Bala, Isang Buhay	Daniel
1990	Urbanito Dizon: The Most Notorious Gangster in Luzon	Urbanito Dizon
1990	Bala at Rosario	Armand
1990	Apo: Kingpin ng Maynila	Lt. Carding Labrador
1990	Alyas Pogi: Birador ng Nueva Ecija	Pat. Henry Cruz
1991	Onyong Majikero	Onyong
1991	Manong Gang	Brando
1991	Captain Jaylo: Batas sa Batas	Capt. Reynaldo Jaylo
1991	Leon ng Maynila	Lt. Col. Romeo Maganto
1992	Alyas Pogi 2	Pat. Henry Cruz
1992	Hanggang May Buhay	Sgt. Alex Aragon
1992	Pangako Sa'yo	Lt. Benjie Cuenco
1993	Dugo ng Panday	Flavio
1993	Ronquillo: Tubong Cavite, Laking Tondo	Adan Ronquillo
1993	Sala sa Init, Sala sa Lamig	Bingo
1993	Ako ang Katarungan: Lt. Napoleon M. Guevarra	Lt. Napoleon Guevarra
1994	Relax Ka Lang, Sagot Kita	Lt. Daniel Santiago
1994	Iukit Mo sa Bala	Dr. Roberto "Bobby" Guerrero
1994	Walang Matigas Na Pulis sa Matinik Na Misis	Capt. Bartolome "Tolome" Reynaldo
1995	Pustahan Tayo, Mahal Mo Ako	Dante Aguilar
1995	Batas Ko ang Katapat Mo	Lt. Abner Sandoval
1995	Wilson Sorronda: Leader Kuratong Baleleng's Solid Group	
1995	Ang Titser Kong Pogi	Joey Perez
1996	SPO4 Santiago: Sharpshooter	SPO4 Jaime Santiago
1996	Pag-ibig Ko sa Iyo'y Totoo	Lt. Mario Romero
1997	Kung Marunong Kang Magdasal Umpisahan Mo Na	Lt. Alex Cuevo
1997	Yes Darling: Walang Matigas Na Pulis... 2	Major Bartolome "Tolome" Reynaldo
1997	Sabi Mo Mahal Mo Ako, Wala ng Bawian	Capt. Gerry Mercado
1997	Buhay Mo'y Buhay Ko Rin	Insp. Dave Gomez
1998	Ben Delubyo	Capt. Benjamin Fajardo
1998	Alyas Pogi: Ang Pagbabalik	Pat. Henry Cruz
1999	Pepeng Agimat	Pepeng Agimat
2000	Minsan Ko Lang Sasabihin	Alex Sembrano
2002	Mahal Kita, Final Answer	Nino Pinlac
2002	Kilabot at Kembot	Leon
2002	Ang Agimat: Anting-anting ni Lolo	Paolo
2003	Bertud ng Putik	Gabriel
2003	Captain Barbell	Captain Barbell
2005	Exodus: Tales from the Enchanted Kingdom	Exodus
2006	Kapag Tumibok Ang Puso: Not Once, But Twice	Marco
2007	Resiklo	Commander Sarmiento
2009	Ang Panday	Panday
2010	Si Agimat at si Enteng Kabisote	Agimat
2011	Ang Panday 2	Panday
2012	Si Agimat, si Enteng at si Ako	Agimat
TBA	Lagot Ka sa Tatay Ko	
TBA	Birador: Alyas Pogi 4	Henry Cruz
TBA	Untitled Brillante Mendoza film	

=== Television ===
Year	Title	Role	Ref.
2000–2005	Idol Ko si Kap	Kap Emilio Noble	
2005–2007	HP: To the Highest Level Na!	Abel	
2007–2014	Kap's Amazing Stories	Host	
2009–2010	Agimat: Ang Mga Alamat ni Ramon Revilla presents Pepeng Agimat	Felipe Dimaanta Sr.	
2013	Indio	Malaya/Simeon/Indio	
2019	Magandang Buhay	Guest	
2021–2022	Agimat ng Agila	Gabriel Labrador	
2023–2025	Walang Matigas Na Pulis sa Matinik Na Misis	Police Maj. Bartolome "Bart"/“Tolome” Reynaldo	
2023	Idol ko si Bong: Bong Revilla's 50th Showbiz Anniversary	Himself	

=== Producer ===
- Alyas Pogi 2 (1991) (executive producer - as Jose Mari Bautista)
- Ako Ang Katarungan (Lt. Napoleon M. Guevarra) (1993) (producer - Jose Mari Bautista)
- Iukit Mo sa Bala! (1994) (producer - as Jose Mari M. Bautista)
- Ang Titser Kong Pogi (1995) (executive producer - as Jose Mari M. Bautista)
- Kung Marunong Kang Magdasal, Umpisahan Mo Na (1996) (producer - as Jose Mari Bautista)
- Yes Darling: Walang Matigas na Pulis 2 (1997) (producer - as Jose Mari M. Bautista)
- Sabi Mo Mahal Mo Ako, Wala Ng Bawian (1997) (producer - as Jose Mari M. Bautista)
- Pepeng Agimat (1999) (line producer - as Jose Mari Bautista)
- Minsan ko Lang Sasabihin (2000) (line producer - as Jose Mari M. Bautista)

== Electoral history ==
Electoral history of Bong Revilla
Year	Office	Party	Votes Bong Revilla received				Result
Year	Office	Party	Total	%	P.	Swing	Result
1995	Vice Governor of Cavite	Lakas–CMD	315,071	—N/a	1st	—N/a	Won
1998	Governor of Cavite	Lakas–CMD	441,601	—N/a	1st	—N/a	Won
2001	Governor of Cavite	Lakas–CMD	283,770	42.65%	2nd	—N/a	Lost
2004	Senator of the Philippines	Lakas–CMD	15,801,531	44.50%	2nd	—N/a	Won
2010	Senator of the Philippines	Lakas–CMD	19,513,521	51.15%	1st	+6.65%	Won
2019	Senator of the Philippines	Lakas–CMD	14,624,445	30.92%	11th	-20.23%	Won
2025	Senator of the Philippines	Lakas–CMD	12,027,845	20.97%	14th	-9.95%	Lost

== Notes ==
Political offices
Preceded by Danilo Lara	Vice Governor of Cavite; 1995–1998	Succeeded by Jonvic Remulla
Preceded by Epimaco Velasco	Governor of Cavite; 1998–2001	Succeeded by Ayong Maliksi
Preceded by Manuel Mariano	Chairman of the Videogram Regulatory Board; 2002–2004	Succeeded by Edu Manzano as Chairman of the Optical Media Board
Party political offices
Preceded by Edcel Lagman	Chairman of Lakas–CMD; 2013–2021	Succeeded by Sara Duterte
Preceded by Sara Duterte	Chairman of Lakas–CMD; 2023–present	Incumbent
