= Philippine Senate Committee on Public Works =

Standing committee of the Senate of the Philippines

Committee on Public Works
- Senate of the Philippines; 20th Congress

History
- New session started: July 28, 2025

Leadership
- Chair: Mark Villar (Nacionalista) since July 29, 2025

Structure
- Seats: 13
- Political groups: Majority (8): NPC (3); Nacionalista (2); Akbayan (1); Lakas (1); Independent (1); Minority (5): PDP (2); Nacionalista (1); Independent (2)

The Philippine Senate Committee on Public Works is a standing committee of the Senate of the Philippines.

== Jurisdiction ==
According to the Rules of the Senate, the committee handles all matters relating to:

- Planning, construction, maintenance, improvement and repair of public buildings, highways, bridges, roads, ports, airports, harbors and parks;
- Drainage, flood control and protection
- Irrigation and water utilities

== Members, 20th Congress ==
Based on the Rules of the Senate, the Senate Committee on Public Works has 13 members.

Position	Member	Party
Chairperson	Mark Villar	Nacionalista
Vice Chairpersons	JV Ejercito (Note: Also serving as the deputy majority leader alongside Risa Hontiveros (Akbayan).)	NPC
Vice Chairpersons	Imee Marcos	Nacionalista
Vice Chairpersons	Erwin Tulfo	Lakas
Deputy Majority Leader	Risa Hontiveros	Akbayan
Members for the Majority	Lito Lapid	NPC
Members for the Majority	Loren Legarda	NPC
Members for the Majority	Raffy Tulfo	Independent
Members for the Majority	Camille Villar	Nacionalista
Deputy Minority Leaders	Rodante Marcoleta	Independent
Deputy Minority Leaders	Joel Villanueva	Independent
Members for the Minority	Ronald dela Rosa	PDP
Members for the Minority	Bong Go	PDP

Ex officio members:

- Senate President pro tempore Panfilo Lacson
- Majority Floor Leader Juan Miguel Zubiri
- Minority Floor Leader Alan Peter Cayetano

Committee secretary: Joey M. Tunac

== Historical membership rosters ==
=== 19th Congress ===
Position	Member	Party
Chairperson	Bong Revilla	Lakas
Vice Chairpersons	Win Gatchalian	NPC
Vice Chairpersons	Mark Villar	Nacionalista
Members for the Majority	JV Ejercito	NPC
Members for the Majority	Bong Go	PDP
Members for the Majority	Lito Lapid	NPC
Members for the Majority	Loren Legarda	NPC
Members for the Majority	Imee Marcos	Nacionalista
Members for the Majority	Robin Padilla	PDP
Members for the Majority	Grace Poe	Independent
Members for the Majority	Raffy Tulfo	Independent
Members for the Majority	Joel Villanueva	Independent
Member for the Minority	Risa Hontiveros	Akbayan

Committee secretary: Maria Gina P. Dellomes

=== 18th Congress ===
Position	Member	Party
Chairperson	Manny Pacquiao	PDP–Laban
Vice Chairpersons	Bong Revilla	Lakas
Vice Chairpersons	Sonny Angara	LDP
Members for the Majority	Panfilo Lacson	Independent
Members for the Majority	Lito Lapid	NPC
Members for the Majority	Ronald dela Rosa	PDP–Laban
Members for the Majority	Francis Tolentino	PDP–Laban
Members for the Majority	Joel Villanueva	CIBAC
Members for the Majority	Grace Poe	Independent
Members for the Majority	Bong Go	PDP–Laban
Members for the Majority	Richard Gordon	Independent
Members for the Minority	Leila de Lima	Liberal
Members for the Minority	Francis Pangilinan	Liberal

Committee secretary: Ethel Hope Dignadice-Villaflor

== See also ==
- List of Philippine Senate committees
