= Salamat, Kaibigan =

2014 speech by Bong Revilla

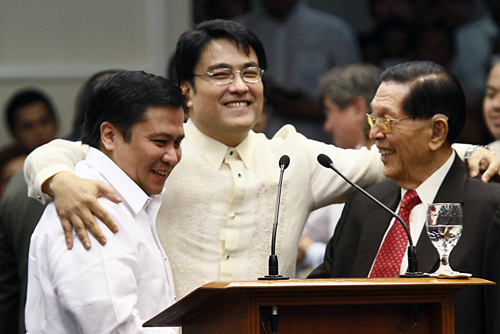
- After delivering his speech, Senator Revilla hugs Senators Juan Ponce Enrile and Jinggoy Estrada, his co-accused in the Priority Development Assistance Fund scam
- English name: Thank You, Friends
- Date: June 9, 2014
- Time: 3:30 pm
- Duration: 30 minutes (scheduled); 38 minutes (actual)
- Venue: Senate of the Philippines
- Location: Pasay, Metro Manila, Philippines
- Theme: Priority Development Assistance Fund scam
- Participants: Ramon "Bong" Revilla, Jr.
- Footage: Rappler coverage
- Website: speech transcript

Salamat, Kaibigan ("Thank You, Friends") is a privilege speech delivered by Ramon "Bong" Revilla, Jr. on the floor of the Senate of the Philippines on June 9, 2014, in response to charges being filed against him at the Sandiganbayan due to his alleged involvement in the Priority Development Assistance Fund scam. It is one of two privilege speeches Revilla has delivered on the scam, with the other speech being delivered in January 2014. In the speech, Revilla attempts to settle his differences with President Benigno Aquino III and his allies, claiming that they have a common interest in improving the Philippines, that there are more important issues that have to be tackled, and that he is not complicit in the scam.

Although Revilla claimed that he delivered the speech for the people, the reaction to the speech was largely negative, especially on social media, where netizens reacted with "amusement, anger and disbelief". He later apologized to those who felt disgusted over his performance—in particular over a song he played towards the end of the speech—saying that the song, and the speech in general, was meant for his supporters rather than his critics, and he understands the reaction elicited online.

== Public reaction ==
Public reaction to Salamat, Kaibigan was largely negative, in particular online. On Twitter, users coined the hashtag "#BongPanes", a play on the song "Boom, Panes" by Vice Ganda, and even the office of President Benigno Aquino III agreed with the online reaction, where 99.93% of social media activity was averse to the speech, according to data collated by its social media team. The Philippine edition of FHM even published an article that highlighted the types of handshakes Revilla used in the video.
