= Philippine Senate Committee on Civil Service, Government Reorganization and Professional Regulation =

Standing committee of the Senate of the Philippines

Committee on Civil Service, Government Reorganization and Professional Regulation
- Senate of the Philippines; 20th Congress

History
- New session started: July 28, 2025

Leadership
- Chair: vacant since May 11, 2026
- Seats: 9

The Philippine Senate Committee on Civil Service, Government Reorganization and Professional Regulation is a standing committee of the Senate of the Philippines.

It was known as the Committee on Civil Service and Government Reorganization until August 3, 2015, when its jurisdiction was expanded.

== Jurisdiction ==
According to the Rules of the Senate, the committee handles all matters relating to:

- The civil service and the status of officers and employees of the Philippine government including their appointment, discipline and retirement
- Government officers and employees' compensation, privileges, benefits and incentives
- Implementation of the constitutional provisions on the rights of government workers to form and join labor organizations
- Public sector labor-management relations and collective negotiation agreements
- The Civil Service Commission
- The Professional Regulation Commission
- The Government Service Insurance System
- The Social Security System
- Regulation of and admission to and the practice of the professions
- Reorganization of the government or any of its branches or instrumentalities
- All human resource development programs pertaining to the government
- All other matters relating to the Philippine bureaucracy

== Members, 20th Congress ==
Based on the Rules of the Senate, the Senate Committee on Civil Service, Government Reorganization and Professional Regulation has 9 members.

As of May 11, 2026
Majority	Minority
Vacant

Ex officio members:

- Senate President pro tempore Loren Legarda
- Acting Majority Floor Leader Joel Villanueva
- Minority Floor Leader Tito Sotto

Committee secretary: Mary Jane M. Arzadon

== Historical membership rosters ==
=== 20th Congress ===
July 30, 2025 – May 11, 2026
Majority	Minority
JV Ejercito (NPC), Deputy Majority Leader	Ronald dela Rosa (PDP), Chair
Risa Hontiveros (Akbayan), Deputy Majority Leader	Bong Go (PDP), Vice Chair
Bam Aquino (KANP)	Francis Escudero (NPC)
Win Gatchalian (NPC)	
Raffy Tulfo (Independent)	
Mark Villar (Nacionalista)	

Ex officio members:

- Senate President pro tempore Panfilo Lacson
- Majority Floor Leader Juan Miguel Zubiri
- Minority Floor Leader Alan Peter Cayetano

Committee secretary: Mary Jane M. Arzadon

=== 19th Congress ===
until June 30, 2025
Majority	Minority
Bong Revilla (Lakas), Chair	Risa Hontiveros (Akbayan), Deputy Minority Leader
Pia Cayetano (Nacionalista), Vice Chair	
JV Ejercito (NPC), Deputy Majority Leader	
Mark Villar (Nacionalista), Deputy Majority Leader	
Win Gatchalian (NPC)	
Raffy Tulfo (Independent)	
Cynthia Villar (Nacionalista)	
Juan Miguel Zubiri (Independent)	

Ex officio members:

- Senate President pro tempore Loren Legarda (July 25, 2022 – May 20, 2024)
- Senate President pro tempore Jinggoy Estrada (May 20, 2024 – June 30, 2025)
- Majority Floor Leader Joel Villanueva (July 25, 2022 – May 20, 2024)
- Majority Floor Leader Francis Tolentino (May 20, 2024 – June 30, 2025)
- Minority Floor Leader Koko Pimentel

Committee secretary: Mary Jane M. Arzadon, JD

=== 18th Congress ===
2019–2022
Majority	Minority
Bong Revilla (Lakas), Chair	Risa Hontiveros (Akbayan), Deputy Minority Leader
Joel Villanueva (CIBAC), Vice Chair	
Bong Go (PDP–Laban)	
Ronald dela Rosa (PDP–Laban)	
Francis Tolentino (PDP–Laban)	
Pia Cayetano (Nacionalista)	

Ex officio members:

- Senate President pro tempore Ralph Recto
- Majority Floor Leader Juan Miguel Zubiri
- Minority Floor Leader Franklin Drilon

Committee secretary: Mary Jane M. Arzadon

== See also ==
- List of Philippine Senate committees
