= Optical Media Board =

Philippine government agency regulating recording media

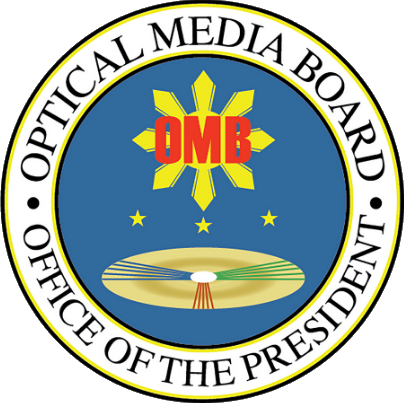
- Official seal

Agency overview
- Formed: October 5, 1985; 41 years ago (as Videogram Regulatory Board); March 2, 2004; 22 years ago (as Optical Media Board)
- Preceding agency: Videogram Regulatory Board
- Jurisdiction: Philippines
- Headquarters: Scout Limbaga, Diliman, Quezon City
- Employees: 54 (2024)
- Agency executive: Dennis Lorenzo B. Pinlac, Chairman
- Parent agency: Office of the President of the Philippines
- Website: omb.gov.ph

The Optical Media Board (OMB; Filipino: Lupon sa Optical Media), formerly known as the Videogram Regulatory Board (VRB), is a Philippine government agency that is part of the Office of the President of the Philippines, responsible for regulating the production, use and distribution of recording media in the Philippines.

== Background ==
The Optical Media Board was formed on October 5, 1985, by virtue of Presidential Decree No. 1987 as the Videogram Regulatory Board (VRB).

On April 17, 2001, the VRB was transferred from the Office of the President to the Department of Trade and Industry (DTI).

Under Republic Act No. 9239 signed by President Gloria Macapagal Arroyo on February 10, 2004, the Videogram Regulatory Board was transferred back to the Office of the President and renamed and reorganized as the Optical Media Board (OMB) in response to the increasing popularity of Video CD and DVD players in the country during the early 2000s, and consequently the widespread piracy of optical media such as CDs, DVDs and Blu-ray discs. It has conducted numerous raids on flea market stalls and similar establishments selling bootleg media including pirated CDs and DVDs.

On May 18, 2026, the House Committees on Public Information and on Government Reorganization approved a substitute bill seeking to abolish the Optical Media Board by repealing the Optical Media Act of 2003, or Republic Act No. 9239. The measure follows the Senate’s approval on March 9, 2026 of Senate Bill No. 1654, which likewise seeks to abolish the OMB and transfer its powers and functions to the Intellectual Property Office of the Philippines.

== History ==
In the early 2000s, raids by the VRB on illegal video establishments increased under the chairmanship of actor Ramon "Bong" Revilla Jr., who lead a strict anti-piracy campaign nationwide.

== List of chairpersons ==
#	Name	Term of office		Previous position
#	Name	Start	End	Previous position
List of Chairperson of Videogram Regulatory Board
1	Eduardo D. Sazon	unknown	unknown	none
2	Bernadette C. Fuentes	unknown	unknown	none
3	Gen. Javier D. Carbonell	unknown	unknown	none
4	Enrique M. Montero	unknown	March 2001	none
5	Brig. Gen. Manuel B. Mariano	March 2001	May 2002	none
6	Ramon "Bong" Revilla Jr.	May 30, 2002	January 2004	Governor of Cavite (1998-2001)
List of Chairperson of Optical Media Board
7	Edu Manzano	February 10, 2004	August 20. 2009	Vice Mayor of Makati (1998-2001)
8	Ronnie Ricketts	October 21, 2009	January 29, 2016	actor
9	Anselmo B. Adriano	March 14, 2016	September 30, 2020	none
10	Christian Natividad	October 1, 2020	November 2021	Mayor of Malolos (2010-2019; since 2022)
11	Jeremy Marquez	November 2021	June 30, 2022	City Councilor, Paranaque
12	Dennis Lorenzo B. Pinlac	December 13, 2024	Present	
