= Jaime Santiago (police officer) =

Filipinio police officer and judge

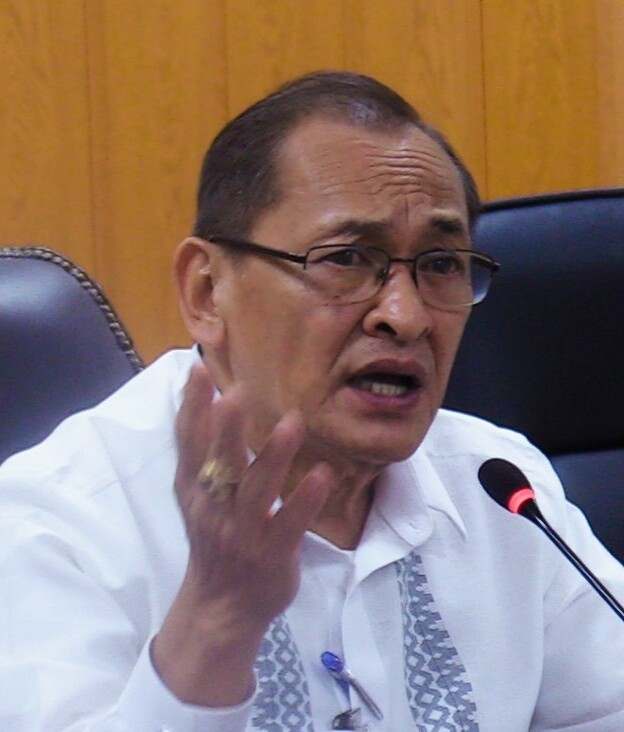
- Santiago in 2025

27th Director of the National Bureau of Investigation
- In office June 24, 2024 – August 18, 2025
- President: Ferdinand R. Marcos, Jr.
- Preceded by: Medardo G. de Lemos
- Succeeded by: Angelito Magno

Personal details
- Born: Jaime B. Santiago; January 9, 1958 (age 68) Philippines
- Education: Philippine College of Criminology (BS); Manuel L. Quezon University (LLB)
- Police career
- Service: Philippine National Police
- Allegiance: Philippines
- Divisions: Manila Police District
- Service years: 1979–2001
- Rank: Senior Inspector

Jaime B. Santiago (born January 9, 1958) is a Filipino retired police officer, lawyer and retired court judge who previously served as director of the National Bureau of Investigation until his resignation in 2025.

His career as a police officer and sharpshooter became the basis of the 1996 action film SPO4 Santiago: Sharpshooter.

== Career ==
=== Police career ===
A licensed criminologist and graduate of Philippine College of Criminology, Santiago started his career at the Western Police District (WPD) with the rank of Patrolman in 1979. He later became a sharpshooting SWAT unit member. While serving in the police force, he graduated with a Bachelor of Laws from Manuel L. Quezon University in 1993, while holding the rank of police sergeant. He also achieved an 81.65% passing grade in the 1994 Philippine Bar Exam.

He received awards such as Senior Non-Commissioned Officer of the Year for the WPD in 1995, the Ten Outstanding Policemen of the Philippines (TOPP) from the Jaycees in the same year, and in 1996, the Act of Heroism award from the National Capital Region Police Office (NCRPO). He retired with the rank of police senior inspector in 2001.

=== Legal career ===
Santiago became a prosecutor in 2003 to 2006, and later, a presiding judge for the Manila RTC. He also served as a professor of criminology for Emilio Aguinaldo College and for his alma mater Philippine College of Criminology. president of the Metropolitan and City Judges Association of the Philippines and a member of the Supreme Court's Committee on Security.

He was awarded as Outstanding Criminologist by the Professional Regulation Commission in 2012.

=== NBI ===
Santiago was appointed as director of the National Bureau of Investigation on June 14, 2024.

Under his tenure, the NBI was involved in the arrest and deportation of Philippine offshore gaming operators personalities Alice Guo and Cassandra Ong, as well as the deportation of former Negros Oriental representative Arnolfo Teves from Timor-Leste to the country, the latter of which was already initiated by his predecessor, Medardo G. de Lemos. Moreover, among his accomplishments in the agency's anti-corruption drive were the arrest of NBI clearance employees and fixers, the relief of Special Task Force (STF) personnel over irregularities, as well as the arrests of a mayor in Pampanga and a former councilor in Albay on extortion charges.

On August 15, 2025, Santiago sent a resignation letter to President Bongbong Marcos. He cited the reasons including the "detractors" and "those who have sinister interests" in his position, as well as an "orchestrated move to blacken his reputation." Santiago continued to perform his duties until his resignation was accepted by October 27. On November 3 however, during the turnover ceremony to the new director, Santiago explicitly stated to the media that he was forced to step down. Such last moments showed his extreme disappointment at the agency.

== Controversies ==
During his tenure as NBI director, Santiago was embroiled in several controversies, many of which culminated in his sudden resignation in August 2025.

=== Allegations of Corruption and "Bagman" Activities ===
The most prominent controversy involved allegations that Santiago maintained an "authorized bagman" to collect protection money (payola) from illegal gambling operations.

- The Claim: Tabloid reports alleged a certain "Paul Tangkad," purportedly from an NBI STF, collected up to ₱2 million weekly from POGO (Philippine Offshore Gaming Operators) and illegal online cockfighting (sabong) operators.
- Santiago’s Response: He vehemently denied these claims, stating the only "Paul Tangkad" in the bureau was assigned to the ballistics unit and had no such authority. He described the allegations as a malicious "smear campaign" despite having a picture showing "Paul Tangkad" beside him and bundles of cash on his table which raised more questions of irregularity.

=== Ransom and Use/Sale of Confiscated Vehicles ===
Sen. Imee Marcos has filed Resolution No. 81 seeking a Senate inquiry into allegations of corruption against Santiago and other officials. She urged the upper chamber to investigate reports that Santiago and some NBI agents had demanded ransom for the release of arrested individuals, illegal searches and detentions, and the unlawful sale of confiscated vehicles. She added that under Santiago’s leadership, vehicles seized in operations were used by agents instead of being preserved as evidence and that some of these had already been sold to bureau executives.

=== Irregularities in POGO Raids ===
Internal friction arose following a high-profile operation in Malolos City, Bulacan, on July 14, 2025.

- The Controversy: NBI agents reportedly used a search warrant citing the wrong address (Sta. Rita instead of Ligas Road), which raised legal questions regarding the raid's validity.
- Diplomatic Fallout: The incident was linked to a rare advisory from China's Ministry of Education warning Chinese students in the Philippines to be vigilant.
- Internal Backlash: Suspecting "something untoward" by his own team, Santiago disbanded the STF. This move reportedly caused significant resentment among career officials and "ramblings" within the bureau since the STF directly reports to him, and the chief and members were personally hand-picked by him.

== Popular culture ==
He was portrayed by then-Cavite Vice Governor Bong Revilla in 1996 film, SPO4 Santiago: Sharpshooter.
