= SPO4 Santiago: Sharpshooter =

1996 Filipino film

- Directed by: Pepe Marcos
- Screenplay by: Jojo Lapus
- Story by: Jaime Santiago
- Produced by: Jose Mari M. Bautista
- Starring: Ramon "Bong" Revilla Jr.
- Cinematography: Danny Bustos
- Edited by: Pepe Marcos
- Music by: Mon Del Rosario
- Production companies: Mahogany Pictures; Viva Films
- Distributed by: Viva Films
- Release date: May 1, 1996
- Running time: 115 minutes
- Country: Philippines
- Languages: Filipino; English

SPO4 Santiago: Sharpshooter is a 1996 Filipino biographical action film edited and directed by Pepe Marcos. The film stars Ramon "Bong" Revilla Jr. in the title role. The film is based on the life of Jaime Santiago, a former police officer who became a presiding judge of the Regional Trial Court in Manila and director of the National Bureau of Investigation.

== Cast ==
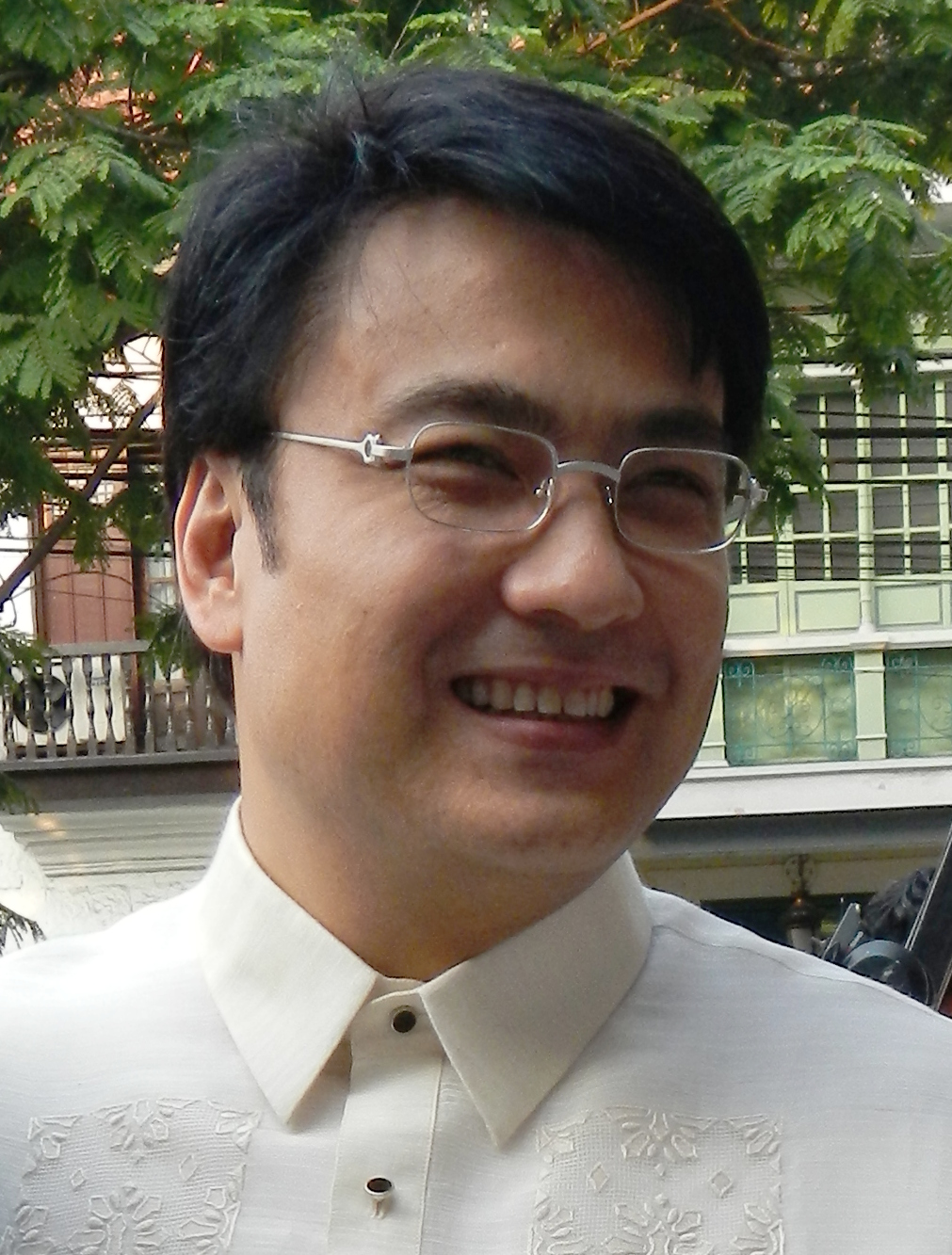
Ramon Bong Revilla, Jr. portrays SPO4 Jaime B. Santiago

- Ramon "Bong" Revilla Jr. as SPO4 Jaime B. Santiago
- Tonton Gutierrez as Boy Palomar
- Ina Raymundo as Elsa Lopez
- Dindi Gallardo as Jaime's Wife
- Raymond Bagatsing as Boy's Henchman
- Junar Aristorenas as Boy's Henchman
- Jun Hidalgo as Boy's Henchman
- July Hidalgo as Boy's Henchman
- Richard Bonnin as Boy's Henchman
- Stefano Mori as Jaime's Son
- Caridad Sanchez as Jaime's Mother
- Lito Legaspi as Col. Dibayan
- King Gutierrez as Jaime's Policeman
- Atoy Co as Jaime's Policeman
- Danny Riel as Jaime's Policeman
- Polly Cadsawan as Jaime's Policeman
- Ben Sagmit as Jaime's Policeman
- Boy Roque as Boy Domingo

== Release ==
The film premiered on May 1, 1996, at the Odeon Theater in Sta. Cruz, Manila. Jaime Santiago himself attended the premiere with actor Bong Revilla, but had to leave early when he heard of a hostage situation taking place in Tondo. After negotiations by the SWAT team on location proved unsuccessful, Santiago positioned himself in a nearby house and shot the hostage taker dead with an M16 rifle, saving the hostage who was a one-year-old girl.
