= Ronald dela Rosa =

Filipino politician and fugitive (born 1962)

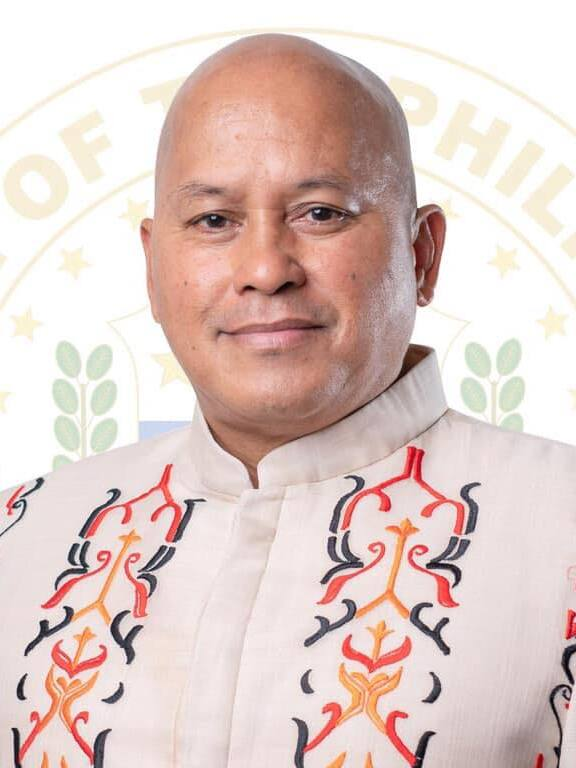
- Official portrait, 2021

Senator of the Philippines
- Incumbent
- Assumed office June 30, 2019

Chair of the Senate Civil Service, Government Reorganization and Professional Regulation Committee
- Incumbent
- Assumed office July 29, 2025
- Preceded by: Bong Revilla

Chair of the Senate Public Order and Dangerous Drugs Committee
- In office July 22, 2019 – June 30, 2025
- Preceded by: Panfilo Lacson
- Succeeded by: JV Ejercito

Director-General of the Bureau of Corrections
- In office April 30, 2018 – October 12, 2018
- President: Rodrigo Duterte
- Preceded by: Valfrie Tabian (acting)
- Succeeded by: Nicanor Faeldon

21st Chief of the Philippine National Police
- In office July 1, 2016 – April 19, 2018
- President: Rodrigo Duterte
- Preceded by: Ricardo Marquez
- Succeeded by: Oscar Albayalde

City Director of the Davao City Police
- In office January 2012 – October 2013
- Mayor: Sara Duterte; Rodrigo Duterte
- Preceded by: Rene Aspera
- Succeeded by: Vicente Danao

Personal details
- Born: Ronald Marapon dela Rosa; January 21, 1962 (age 64) Santa Cruz, Davao (now Davao del Sur), Philippines
- Party: PDP (since 2018)
- Spouse: Nancy Comandante (m. 1989)
- Children: 3
- Education: Mindanao State University; Philippine Military Academy (BS); University of Southeastern Philippines (MPA, PhD)
- Occupation: Politician, police officer, death squad leader
- Profession: Police general (Retired)

Military service
- Years of service: 1986–2019
- Other name: Bato
- Police career
- Service: Philippine Constabulary; Bureau of Corrections; Philippine National Police
- Division: PNP Intelligence Group; PNP DHRDD; Police Regional Office 11; Davao Del Sur Police Provincial Office; Compostela Valley Police Provincial Office
- Police office: Davao City Police Office
- Service years: 1986–2018
- Rank: Director General
- Criminal information
- Criminal charge: Crimes against humanity
- Reward amount: ₱50,000,000
- Capture status: Fugitive
- Wanted by: International Criminal Court
- Wanted since: November 6, 2025
- Fugitive (in hiding) from International Criminal Court Warrant of Arrest

Ronald Marapon dela Rosa (born January 21, 1962), known by his nickname Bato, (Note: Bato is the Cebuano and Tagalog word for "rock" or "stone".) is a Filipino politician, retired police officer, and fugitive. He has been a senator of the Philippines since 2019. He served under the Duterte administration as the chief of the Philippine National Police (PNP) from July 1, 2016, to April 19, 2018, overseeing the government's war on drugs. He also served as director general of the Bureau of Corrections from April 30 to October 12, 2018.

Dela Rosa was born into poverty in Santa Cruz, Davao del Sur, a town next to Davao City. He worked as a fish vendor and bus conductor growing up. After briefly attending the Mindanao State University, he entered the Philippine Military Academy and graduated in 1986, upon which he became acquainted with Davao City OIC Vice Mayor Rodrigo Duterte. In years before and after the 1986 People Power Revolution, dela Rosa served as the chief handler of the anti-communist vigilante group Tadtad, which was accused of committing massacres in its operations.

Dela Rosa is currently wanted by the International Criminal Court (ICC) in The Hague for crimes against humanity due to his involvement in the drug war during the administration of Rodrigo Duterte, who was arrested in March 2025 and is currently detained at The Hague. During a Senate hearing in October 2024, Duterte called Dela Rosa one of the commanders of his death squad.

On November 8, 2025, Philippine Ombudsman Jesus Crispin Remulla claimed that the ICC had issued an arrest warrant for Dela Rosa, though the ICC denied this at the time. Dela Rosa went into hiding for six months upon learning of the possible warrant, and had consequently been absent from 31 Senate sessions. On May 11, 2026, he was assisted by Senator Alan Peter Cayetano in returning to the Senate upon being convinced by Cayetano to help vote for the removal of Tito Sotto as Senate President amidst the second impeachment of Vice President Sara Duterte.

Upon attempts by the National Bureau of Investigation to serve the ICC arrest warrant, Dela Rosa evaded arrest and stayed within the premises of the Philippine Senate at the GSIS Building from May 11 to 14, 2026, where he was placed under a contested protective custody while awaiting a Supreme Court decision on a petition to block his arrest. During a three-day lockdown for his stay at the Senate, gunshots were fired by the Senate Sergeant-at-Arms (OSAA) on the evening of May 13 against an alleged offensive by members of the NBI; a later investigation by the Philippine National Police concluded that no attack was taking place during the shooting, with the first shots initiated by the OSAA. In the early hours of May 14, 2026, dela Rosa escaped the Senate premises in a vehicle owned by Senator Robin Padilla.

== Early life and education ==
Ronald Marapon dela Rosa was born on January 21, 1962, at Barangay Bato, Santa Cruz, Davao del Sur, to Teodoro Diamaton dela Rosa Sr. and Anesia Cruspero Marapon. His family was "dirt poor" as his father earned little money from his job as a tricycle driver. He was young when he worked as a fish market porter and bus conductor.

Dela Rosa went to Mindanao State University (MSU) to study for a Bachelor of Science degree in public administration. In 1982, he left MSU to join the Philippine Military Academy (PMA) and graduated in 1986 as part of PMA Sinagtala class. He then earned a Master of Public Administration degree in 1998 and a Ph.D. in development administration in 2006 from the University of Southeastern Philippines in Davao City.

Dela Rosa completed a Scout Ranger Orientation Course, Police Intelligence Officer Advance Course, Police Officers' Comptrollership Course, and the Police Safety Officer Course. He also attended training courses of the FBI Academy and U.S. Army Ranger School in the United States, and Air Marshal Instructors Course by the Australian Federal Police.

Dela Rosa was nicknamed "Bato" during his first assignment in Davao, when his upperclassmen likened his body to a rock.

== Police career ==
=== Early career (1986–2012) ===
Dela Rosa joined the police force in 1986 as a Lieutenant of the now-defunct Philippine Constabulary (Note: On January 29, 1991, the Philippine Constabulary was merged with the Integrated National Police to form the Philippine National Police.) in Davao City. During the 1980s, he was the chief handler of the extremist religious cult Tadtad, which was accused of committing massacres and cannibalism.

In 1992, he was designated as chief inspector and worked as one of the staff at Police Regional Office (PRO)-Davao. In 1997, he was designated as police provincial director of Compostela Valley.

In 1999, he was assigned to the office of the Police Director of the Philippine National Police (PNP) at Camp Crame in Quezon City.

In August 22, 2000, a Cotabato City regional trial court branch 13, under Judge Israel Bagundang, ordered the arrest of at least five members of the Presidential Anti-Organized Crime Task Force (PAOCTF) - then Maj. Dela Rosa, Capt. Alen Bacarra Delvo, Steve Bohol de la Cruz, Paul Arias, and Wilson Ugdiman - in Davao city after they have defied a court order by refusing to turn over firearms confiscated from the complainants. Cynthia Guiani-Sayadi, chapter president of the Integrated Bar of the Philippines in Cotabato, filed criminal charges to the five members of the PAOCTF claiming she and her relatives were "harassed, searched illegally and detained for at least five hours in Davao City. Dela Rosa denied this allegation, claiming it was "pure harassment" and told the media that he was expecting the issuance of the arrest order, and have filed a temporary restraining order. before the Court of Appeals the day the court issued contempt against dela Rosa and the four other men under PAOCTF.

In 2001, he returned to PRO-Davao and continued his service as deputy chief of the Office of the Regional Personnel and Human Resource and Development Division (ORPHRDD) of Region XI. In 2003, he was promoted to Police Superintendent and was assigned to Camp Catitipan in Davao City. He was then transferred to the Directorate for Human Resources Doctrine and Development as head of training. In 2005, he was assigned to the Davao City Police Office (DCPO) as a city personnel officer. After eight months, he was transferred back to PRO-Davao and was promoted as chief of the Regional Intelligence and Investigation Division (RIID). In 2007, he became the director of the Compostela Valley Provincial Police Office (CVPPO) as its police chief. In 2008, he was promoted to a rank of Senior Superintendent. In 2009, he was moved to Davao del Sur where he served as director of the Davao del Sur Provincial Police Office (DSPPO). In 2011, he became the chief of the Regional Logistics and Research Development Division (RL-RDD) in PRO-Davao. In 2012, he was assigned to Davao City as the new director of the Davao City Police Office.

=== Davao City Police Office Chief (2012–2013) ===
Dela Rosa served as the chief of the Davao City Police Office from January 2012 to October 2013 under Mayors Sara Duterte (in office: June 30, 2010 – June 30, 2013) and Rodrigo Duterte (in office: June 30, 2013 – June 30, 2016). In 2012, he led the crackdown on the carnapping syndicate allegedly masterminded by Ryan "Baktin" Yu. In July 2013, he headed the successful rescue of the kidnapped Filipino-Chinese businesswoman Sally Chua. He also directed the implementation of Oplan Tokhang (Cebuano portmanteau for tuktok, "knock", and hangyo, "persuade"), a campaign against illegal drugs where the police would knock on the doors of suspected drug users and distributors and persuade them to cease their illegal activities; and Oplan Pakgang, (Cebuano portmanteau for "Pitulon ang Kabatan-onan sa Gang", "Disciplining Youths in Gangs") where the police, through a series of lectures and discussions, discouraged Davao City's youth from joining criminal gangs and other illegal activities.

=== Camp Crame (2013–2016) ===
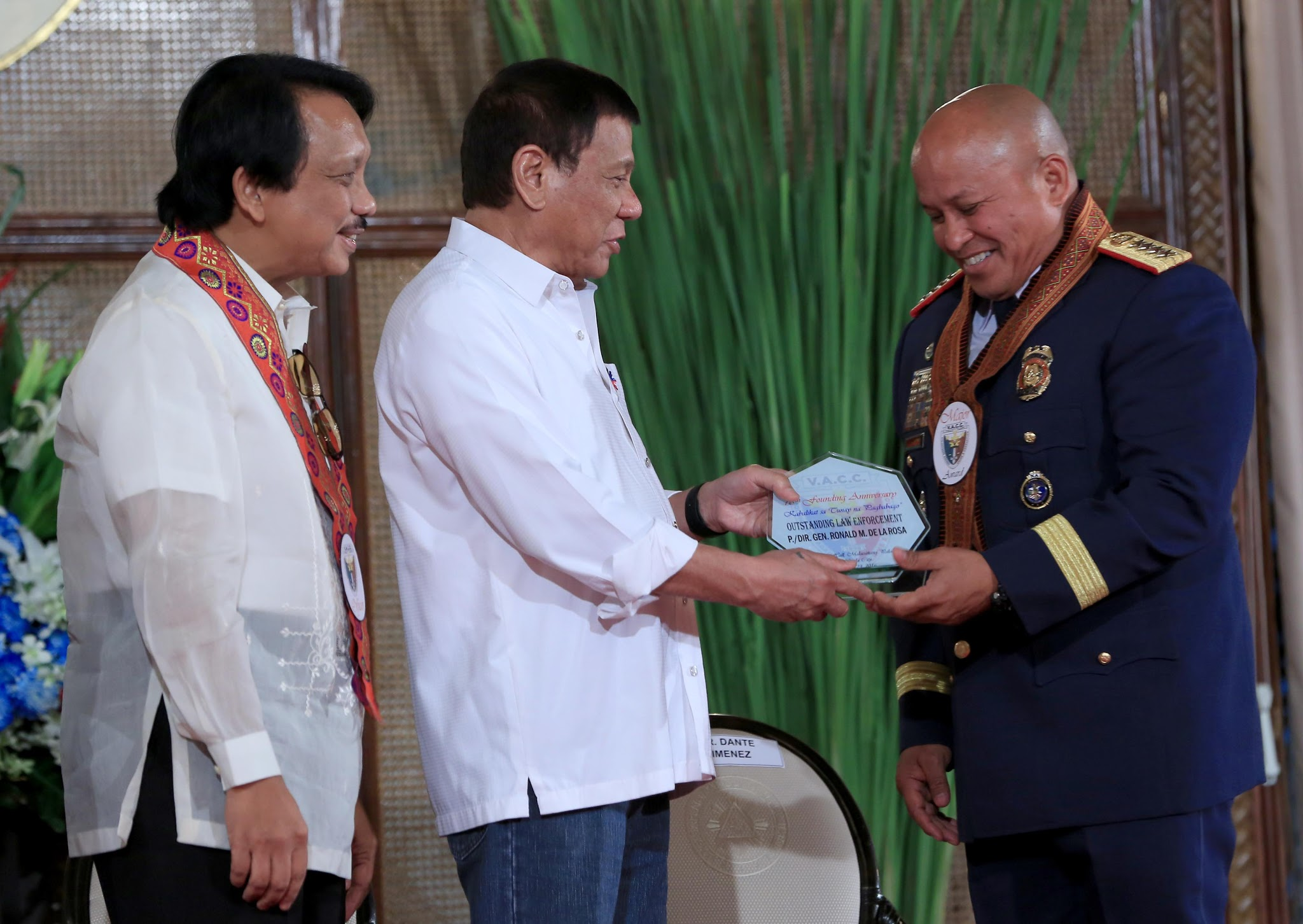
President Rodrigo Duterte (center) awards to PNP Director-General Ronald Dela Rosa (right) the Major Award for Law Enforcement during the 18th anniversary celebration of Volunteers Against Crime and Corruption (2016).

After serving as Davao City Police Chief, Dela Rosa was assigned to the national headquarters of the Philippine National Police in Camp Crame where he worked for the PNP Intelligence Group from October 2013 to December 2014. In 2015, he became a member of the PNP Board of Inquiry which investigated the Mamasapano clash that claimed the lives of 44 Special Action Force commandos, 17 Moro Islamic Liberation Front (MILF) members and five civilians while the cops were on a mission to arrest international terrorist Zulkifli Abdhir, alias Marwan. Dela Rosa also served as the executive officer of the Directorate for Human Resource and Doctrine Development (HRDD).

A few days before the May 9, 2016, Philippine general election, Dela Rosa was relieved as brigade commander of the Reactionary Standby Support Force (RSSF) of the Philippine National Police allegedly due to his Facebook posts seen to be in favour of then-presidential candidate Rodrigo Duterte. However, his commanding officer at that time, PNP deputy chief for operations Deputy Director-General Danilo Constantino, denied that Dela Rosa's Facebook posts were the main reasons why he was relieved of his duty. According to Constantino, Dela Rosa was relieved from the RSSF so that he could focus on his responsibilities as executive officer of the HRDD. Nonetheless, Constantino stated that the PNP Internal Affairs Service will investigate Dela Rosa's Facebook posts for possible administrative liabilities as the officers of the Philippine National Police are required to be neutral and apolitical during the elections.

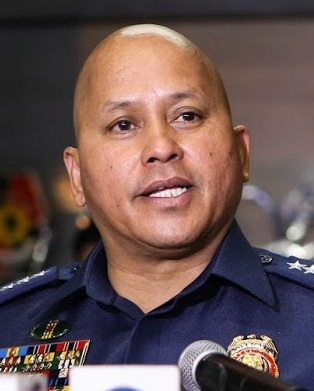
Dela Rosa in 2016

=== PNP Chief and BuCor director (2016–2018) ===
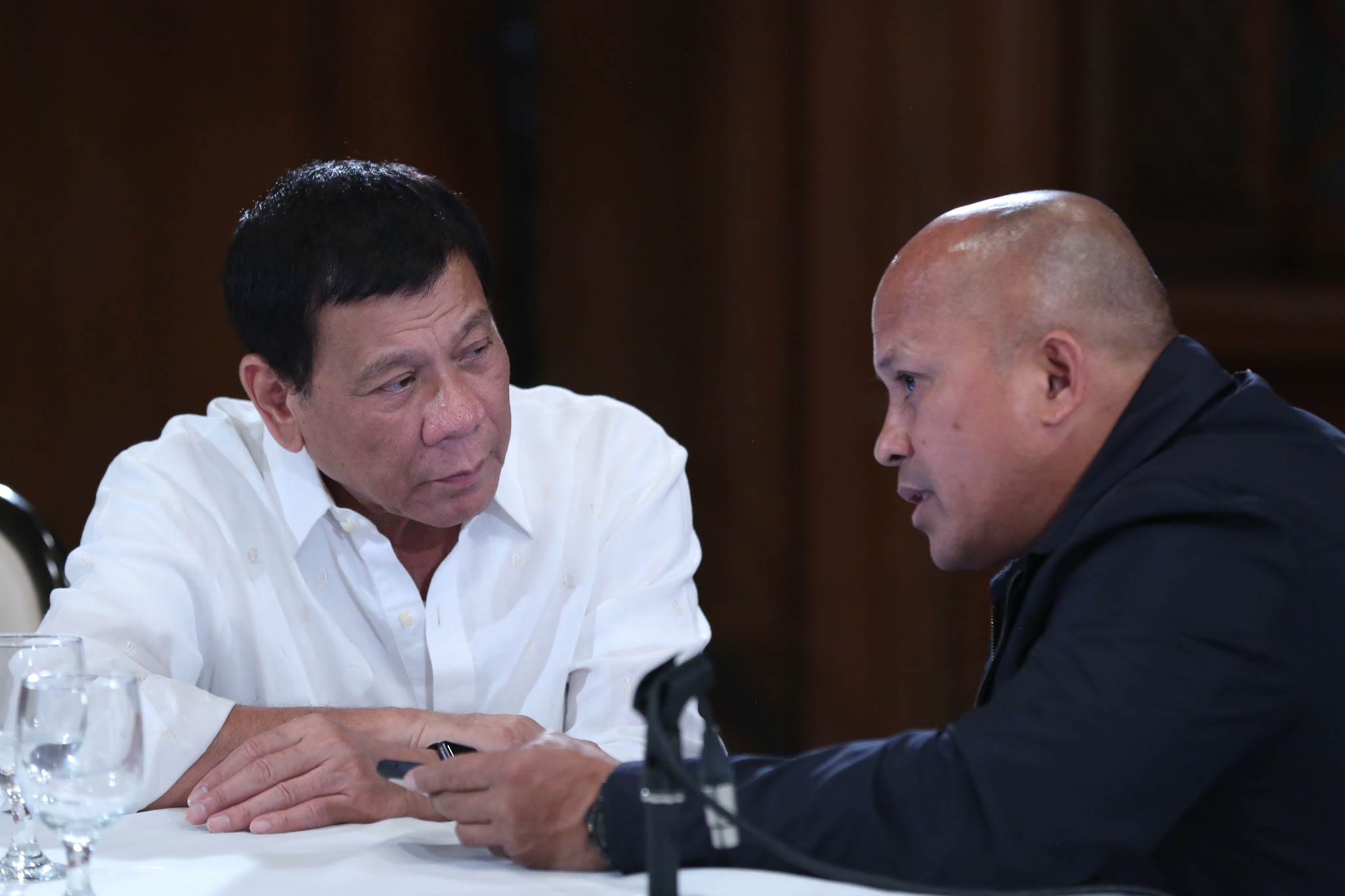
President Rodrigo Duterte meeting with PNP Police Director General Ronald dela Rosa in the Malacañan Palace, August 2016

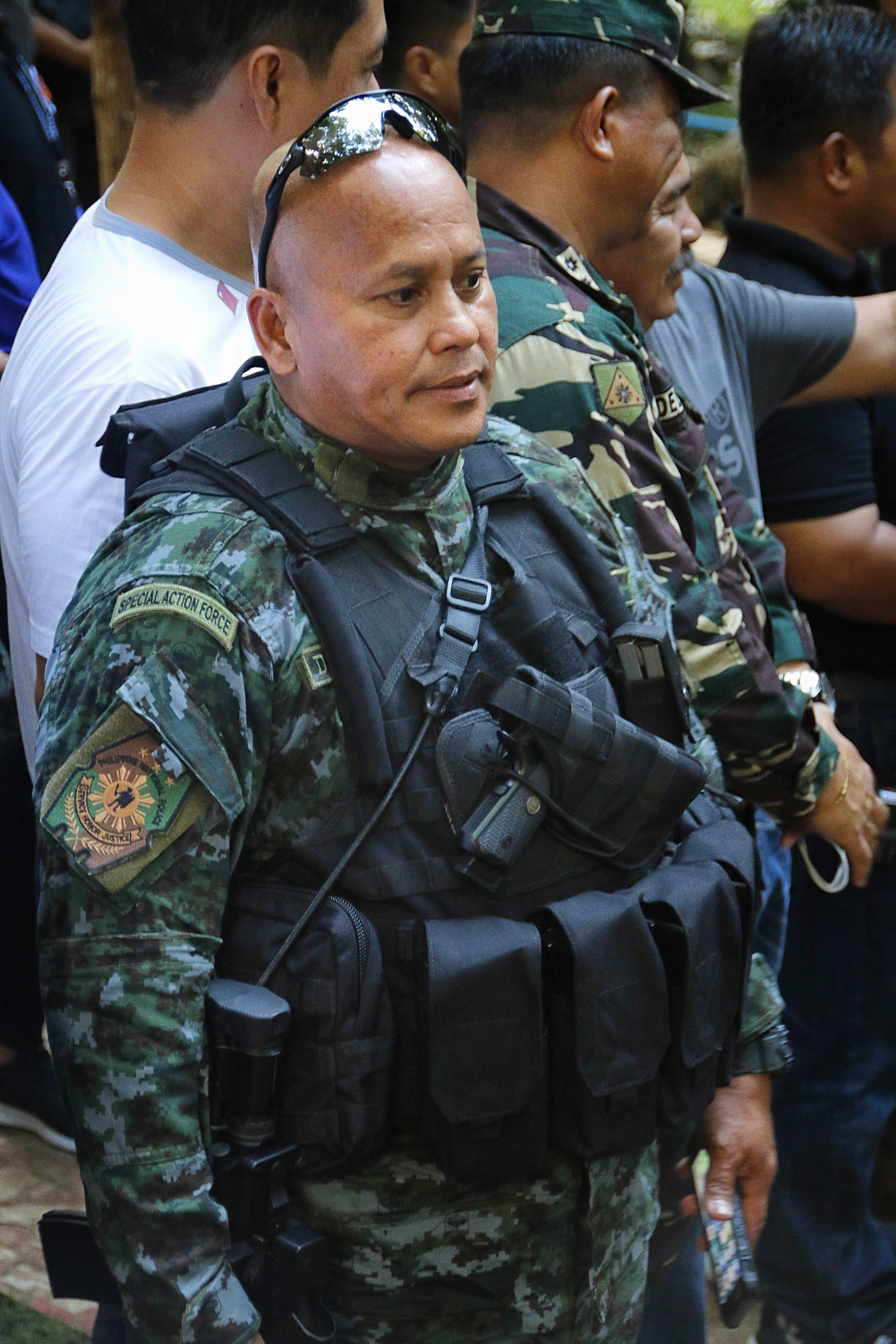
Dela Rosa in SAF uniform in June 2017

Dela Rosa was handpicked by then presumptive President Rodrigo Duterte as the new PNP Chief on May 19, 2016. He vowed to implement on a national scale the Davao model of law enforcement, saying, "If someone fights back, they'll die. If nobody fights back, we'll make them fight back. Produce blood. Instil fear."

On July 1, 2016, he was officially sworn in as the 21st chief of the Philippine National Police while being promoted to director-general, the highest-ranked PNP officer. He issued Command Memorandum Circular No. 16-2016, or Project Double Barrel, formalizing the nationwide drug war, a campaign that he said was "really about killings". He addressed the public to tell them to "kill drug lords and burn their houses".

Amid Vice President Leni Robredo's criticisms of the Duterte administration's war on drugs, in October 2017, Dela Rosa said Robredo should set aside her alleged political ambitions to become president and advised her to "help Duterte first". Dela Rosa was set to retire on January 21, 2018, due to the mandatory retirement at age 56, but his term was extended for 3 months until April 21, 2018.

During his stint as PNP chief, Dela Rosa made headlines regularly as he led the controversial drug war and Oplan Tokhang operations throughout the country. He is suspected of having taken part in a "common plan" to neutralize alleged criminals during the drug war.

On August 25, 2016, the newly appointed Chief of the National Police stated "You know who these drug lords are. Do you want to kill them? Kill them. It's okay because you're the victim here." "If you want, you know who these drug lords are. Go to their houses. Pour gasoline in their houses, set it on fire. Show them you're angry".

Several groups including human rights groups and religious leaders strongly objected to Dela Rosa and President Duterte's initiatives. The controversy has been widely condemned for the number of deaths resulting from police operations and allegations of systematic extrajudicial executions including planting fabricated evidence to make it appear a suspected drug personality has possession of drugs and resisting arrest from authorities. Reports of drug-related killings reached the United Nations Human Rights Council as the death toll reached 12,000 according to news organizations and human rights groups. In 2019, during his campaign, Dela Rosa took pride in the drug war as it supposedly lessened the crime rate and resulted in millions of drug personalities surrendering to the authorities.

Dela Rosa is among the "Davao Boys", a small circle of Duterte's closest and trusted associates, which included police officers who were previously posted to Davao and later tasked with implementing the drug war nationwide. He was considered the chief enforcer of Duterte's drug war during his tenure as chief of police.

In May 2018, Dela Rosa was appointed as director general of the Bureau of Corrections. He held the post from April 30, 2018, until October 12, 2018.

==== Key positions ====
- Provincial Director, Compostela Valley Police Provincial Office
- Provincial Director, Davao Del Sur Police Provincial Office
- Chief, Police Regional Office 11 Regional Logistics and Research Development Division
- Chief, Police Regional Office 11 Regional Investigation and Detective Management Division
- City Director, Davao City Police Office
- Deputy Director for Operations, PNP Intelligence Group
- Deputy Director for Administration, PNP Intelligence Group
- Executive officer, PNP Directorate for Human Resource Doctrine and Development
- Chief, PNP
- Director general, BUCOR

== Political career ==
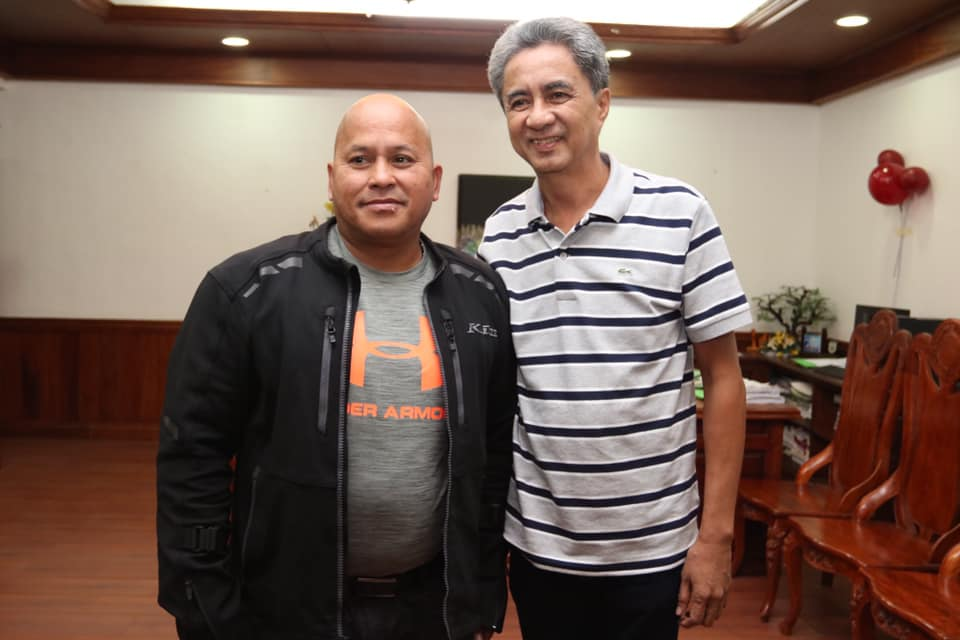
Senator Dela Rosa (left) visits Aurora Governor Gerardo Noveras in 2019.

=== Committee Chairmanships ===
- Committee on Public Order and Dangerous Drugs
- Committee on National Defense and Security; Peace, Reconciliation and Unification
- Committee on Civil Service, Government Reorganization and Professional Regulation

=== 18th Congress ===
Dela Rosa placed a bid for a Senate seat and won placing fifth overall, garnering 19 million votes in the 2019 Philippine Senate election. Dela Rosa took office on June 30, 2019. Dela Rosa Chaired the Senate Committee on Public Order and Dangerous Drugs.

In August 2019, Dela Rosa caused controversy when he said in an interview that convicted rapist-murderer and former Calauan mayor Antonio Sanchez "deserves a second chance"; Dela Rosa said that "if it is determined by the Board of Pardons and Parole that he deserves that commutation, then why not? He deserves a second chance in life." Dela Rosa was highlighted in the news when he got angry at a student leader who raised the issue of what Dela Rosa said regarding Sanchez' possible release while at a Senate hearing on bringing back the mandatory Reserve Officers' Training Corps (ROTC) for senior high school students; Dela Rosa said that the student's criticism was "irrelevant to the topic that was being discussed" during the session.

Despite some issues that were raised against him, Dela Rosa filed bills including bringing back capital punishment to the country—specifically for drug traffickers—which was not passed. Among the initial bills he prioritized were an act regulating the use of government ambulances, the Department of Overseas Filipino Act, police scholarships for qualifying students in all barangays, establishing crisis centers for street children in every region in the Philippines, the creation of barangay community peace and order councils, and job training for older workers.

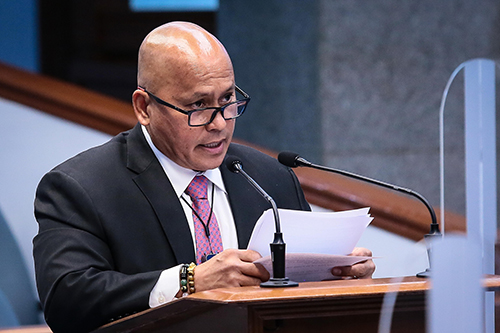
Dela Rosa in 2020

In June 2021, Dela Rosa sponsored the Bureau of Fire Protection (BFP) Modernization Bill in the plenary for the Senate to be ratified. The amendment, which Dela Rosa inserted without authorization, would allow BFP personnel to carry short firearms during fire emergencies and disasters, provided that training will be undertaken with the Department of Interior and Local Government and the Philippine National Police. Dela Rosa said only 2,282 out the total 30,290 BFP personnel would be allowed to carry short firearms to protect their colleagues. He explained in Filipino, "...the usual complaint of our firefighters, that during fire incidents, there are people who try to take away their water hoses. Sometimes, there are firefighters who get stabbed because there are people who want their houses to be saved from the fire first." Some senators declined to ratify the reform but were outvoted; President Rodrigo Duterte signed the bill into law in September 2021.

Dela Rosa voted in favor of a law signed in September 2021 by President Duterte that imposed additional taxes on Philippine Offshore Gaming Operators (POGOs).

==== 2022 presidential campaign ====
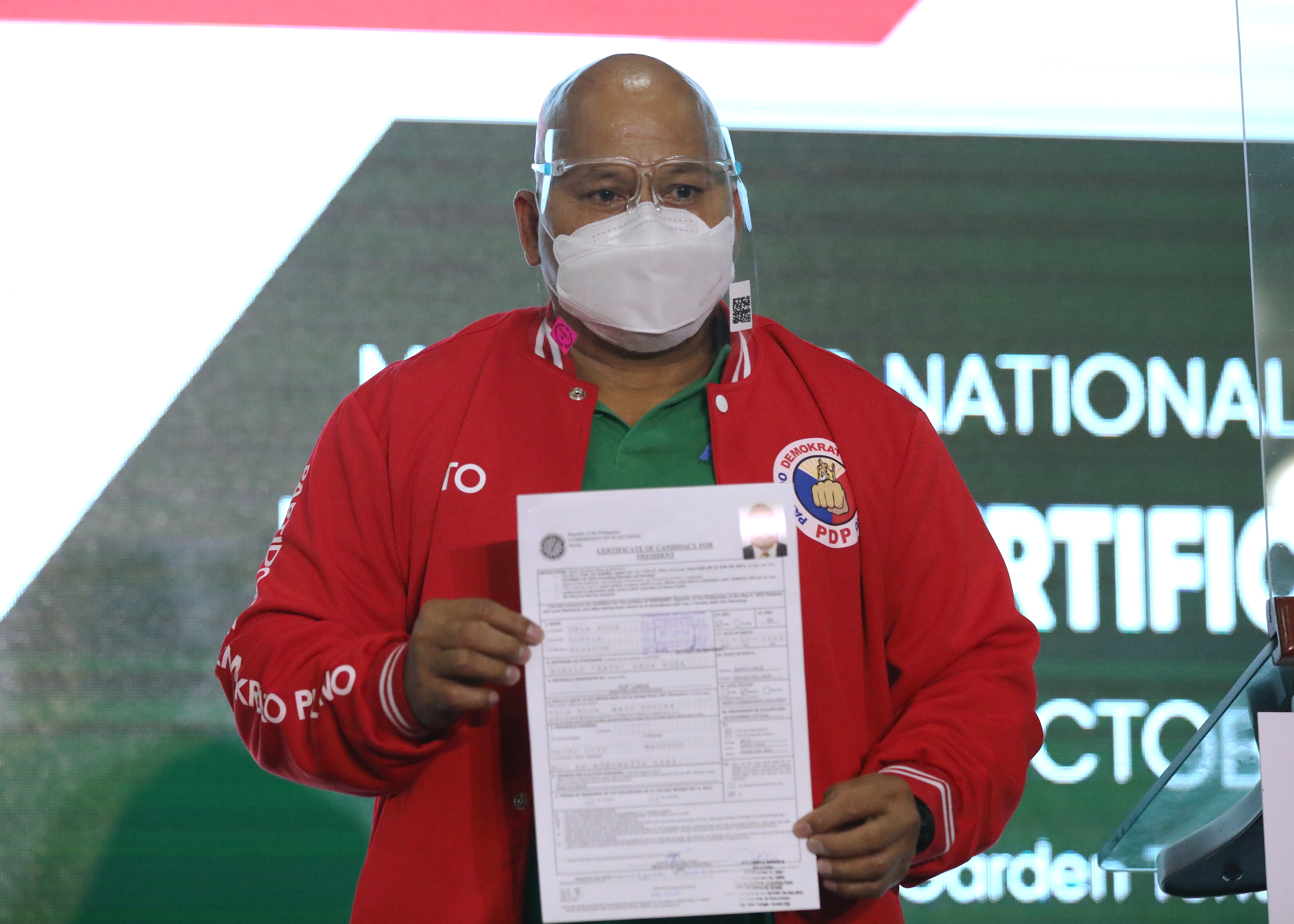
Senator Dela Rosa files his Certificate of Candidacy for president in 2021.

On October 8, 2021, the PDP–Laban faction supported by President Duterte announced dela Rosa as their candidate for president of the Philippines in the 2022 election, the same day dela Rosa filed his certificate of candidacy before the Commission on Elections. However, on November 13, 2021, the same day that Sara Duterte filed her candidacy as the running mate of Bongbong Marcos, dela Rosa withdrew his candidacy as per party's decision.

=== 19th Congress ===
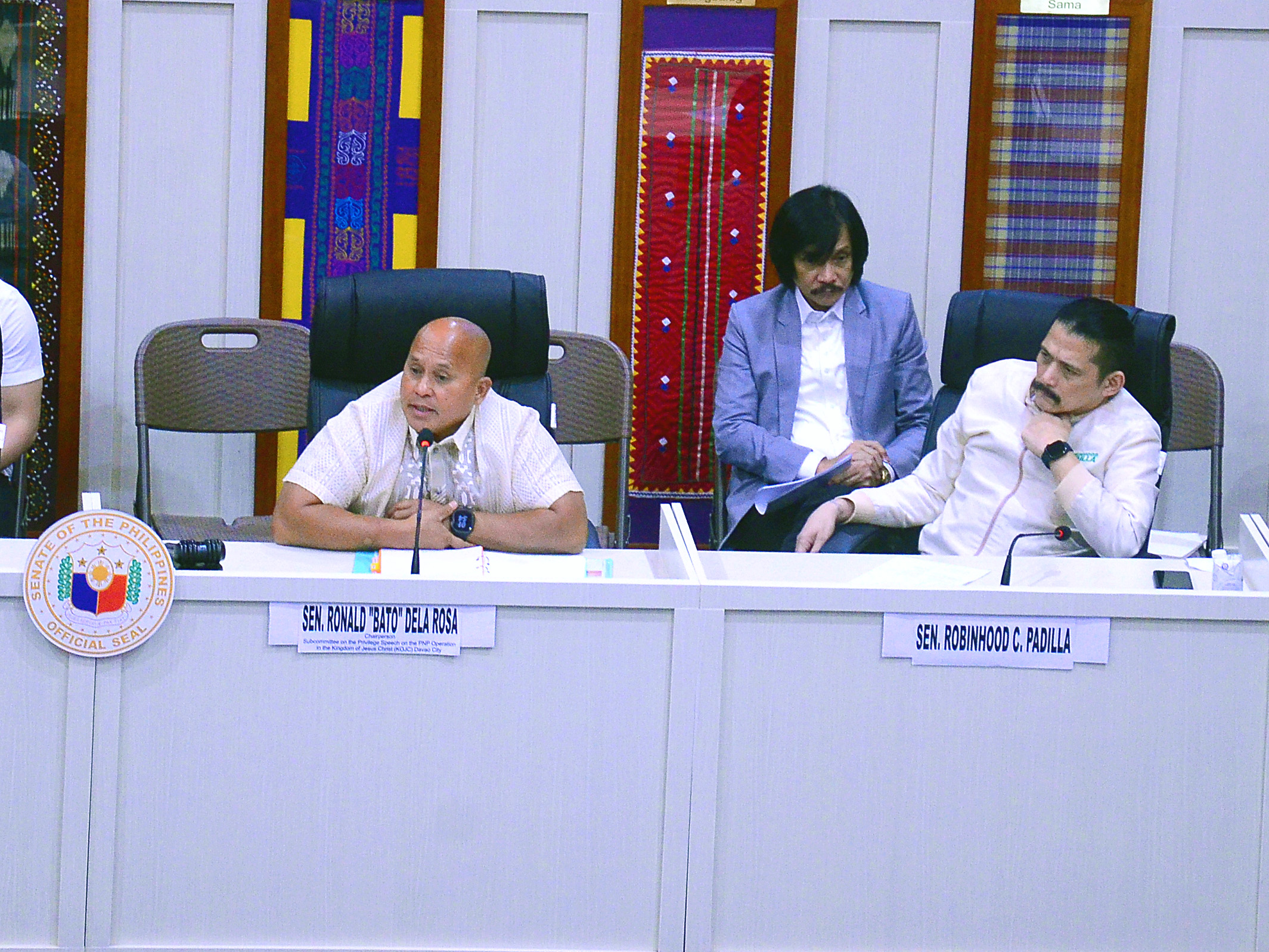
Senators dela Rosa (left) and Robin Padilla (right) during a public hearing on September 6, 2024, looking into alleged abuses committed by the Philippine National Police in its operation against Quiboloy.

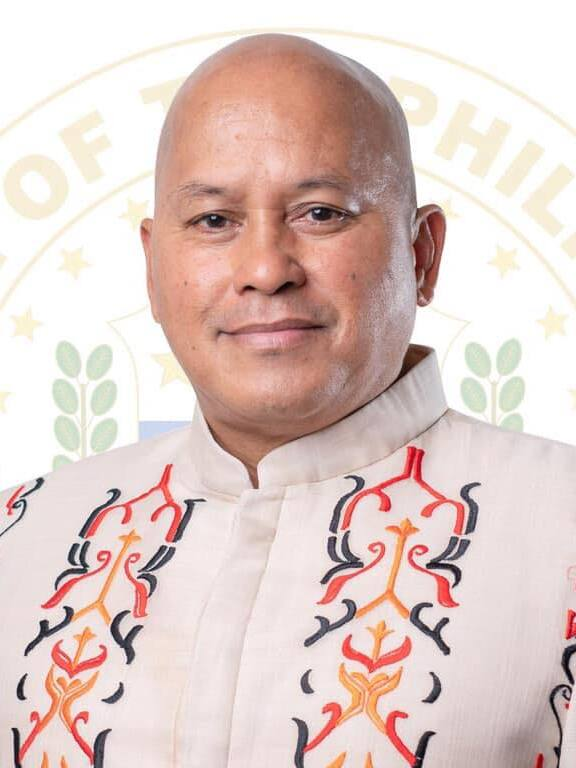
Official portrait, 2021

By 2022, dela Rosa's entire senate staff was composed of members of his family. His daughter Marianne Kristel "Macky" dela Rosa-Estoesta was his chief of staff, his niece Joanna Cedie dela Rosa was his media relations officer, and Jessica May "Mingkay" dela Rosa was his appointments secretary.

Upon the opening of the 19th Congress in July 2022, Dela Rosa filed his priority bills, which included the institutionalization of the government's anti-communist insurgency task force; the reimposition of the death penalty for convicted large-scale drug traffickers; the mandating of the ROTC in higher education and technical-vocational institutions; and the amendment of the Party-list System Act to disallow progressive party-lists that he linked to alleged terrorist organizations from joining Congress.

In an effort to decongest prisons, Dela Rosa filed a bill decriminalizing illegal drug use—excluding illegal drug pushing, manufacturing, and trafficking—and automatically sending drug users to rehabilitation centers. He was discouraged by strong opposition from law enforcement agencies over his proposal.

In September 2023, Dela Rosa along with Senator Risa Hontiveros led a senate probe against the Socorro Bayanihan Services for allegations of being a cult and abuse.

After illegal activities of POGOs were exposed in 2022, Dela Rosa suggested a ban may be a possible solution; a year later, he recommended the creation of a dedicated zone for POGOs, where the gambling corporations are restricted to operate. In 2024, a House quadruple committee investigation into the possible links of POGOs to the illegal drug trade and other crimes prompted Dela Rosa to remark that questioning the illegal activities of POGOS was "unnecessary"; Dela Rosa alleged that the House was plotting to implicate him and President Duterte in the extrajudicial killings that occurred during the war on drugs. During the House hearings, Kerwin Espinosa testified that dela Rosa coerced him to link Senator Leila de Lima to the drug trade.

In regards to the International Criminal Court's (ICC) investigation in the Philippines, Dela Rosa has maintained that since the Philippines withdrew from the in 2019, the ICC no longer has jurisdiction over allegations related to the drug war killings during Duterte's presidency. This was contrary to fact checks by media outlets stating that the ICC has jurisdiction over crimes committed during the Philippines' membership. In January 2023, Dela Rosa said he is ready for a probe by the ICC and would cooperate if the Marcos administration decides so but was confident the government will not. By 2024, Dela Rosa has been repeatedly skeptical on President Marcos' pronouncements that the country will not cooperate with the ICC.

=== 20th Congress ===
==== 2025 senatorial campaign ====
On October 3, 2024, Dela Rosa filed his candidacy for the 2025 Philippine Senate elections under the Duterte-led Partido Demokratiko Pilipino (PDP).

Following the arrest of Rodrigo Duterte by the International Criminal Court (ICC) in March 2025, he stated that he is willing to join Duterte in The Hague if all legal remedies are exhausted. However, dela Rosa went to an undisclosed location within the Philippines. He was considered to be hiding from the authorities.

He was re-elected as senator in May 2025, placing 3rd in the official results, with 20,773,946 of votes.

==== Impeachment of Sara Duterte ====
Dela Rosa supported Vice President Sara Duterte in regards to the first impeachment proceedings against her. In May 2025, Dela Rosa projected that there are enough senators in the upcoming 20th Congress to acquit Duterte.

He filed a motion to have the proceedings dismissed before the Senators took oath as judges in an impeachment trial court on June 10, 2025. The impeachment complaint was remanded back to the House of Representatives instead after Alan Peter Cayetano amended the motion. This move was tagged as a victory by Dela Rosa and is "effectively a dismissal".

On June 14, Dela Rosa posted a deepfake AI-generated video showing two students testifying that the impeachment process was selective and politically motivated. When informed it was an AI video, Dela Rosa maintained that the video creator had a point.

==== ICC warrant, disappearance, and attempted arrest ====
CCTV footage of the Senate showing Dela Rosa being chased by NBI agents inside the Senate premises.

Interior secretary Jonvic Remulla claimed on November 8, 2025, that he had received an "unofficial" warrant of arrest for Ronald dela Rosa from the International Criminal Court. On November 10, Dela Rosa was noted to be absent from the Senate, with rumors circulating that he had gone into hiding. He would not return to the Senate for six months. According to Dela Rosa, he spent that time studying the Bible and travelling around the country while remaining out of public view. Civil society group Wag Kang KuCorrupt filed a complaint before the Senate ethic committee over dela Rosa's absence from the Senate.

On February 13, 2026, the ICC included dela Rosa among eight indirect co-perpetrators in the crimes against humanity case against president Duterte during the Philippine drug war.

On May 9, 2026, numerous media outlets claimed the ICC had formally issued dela Rosa's arrest warrant and its representatives are already in the Philippines. However, ICC Spokesperson Oriane Maillet said those claims were false and that no public arrest warrants have been issued in relations to the Philippines.

On May 11, 2026, Dela Rosa resurfaced in the Senate to vote for the removal of Tito Sotto as Senate President, and the installation of Alan Peter Cayetano as Sotto's replacement. Former Senator Antonio Trillanes and agents of the National Bureau of Investigation (NBI) also came to the Senate to implement an alleged ICC warrant against dela Rosa. His camp then sought a temporary restraining order (TRO) from the Philippine Supreme Court to prevent his arrest, arguing that there was no "valid" judicial warrant issued. The ICC later confirmed the warrant, which was issued confidentially by the Pre-Trial Chamber I on November 6, 2025.

The NBI allegedly attempted to arrest Dela Rosa on the same day. A CCTV footage was presented by the Senate as evidence, showing Dela Rosa running from NBI operatives who were chasing him when he entered the Senate building. Witnesses reported hearing gunfire during the chase. In response to the report the government stated that nobody was injured. Dela Rosa arrived at the Senate plenary enraged, claiming he had been "wrestled" by the NBI and that former senator Trillanes was involved. Dela Rosa also asked the Senate to escort the NBI agents and Trillanes out from the Senate building; however, the Senate placed the entire building into a full lockdown, prohibiting all individuals inside the premises, including the NBI agents and Trillanes, from exiting the building. It was lifted later on the evening. Dela Rosa was then placed under Senate protective custody. Consequently, the NBI agents who attempted to arrest Dela Rosa were cited in contempt by the Senate as soon as surveillance footages were presented at the plenary. Dela Rosa remained in the senate compound until May 14, when he left the compound at approximately 2:30 A.M. The Senate security chief was ordered suspended by the Ombudsman after a shootout at the Senate building that allegedly resulted in dela Rosa's escape.

In October 2026, the Philippine government announced a reward of 50 million pesos for information leading to dela Rosa's arrest.

== Personal life ==
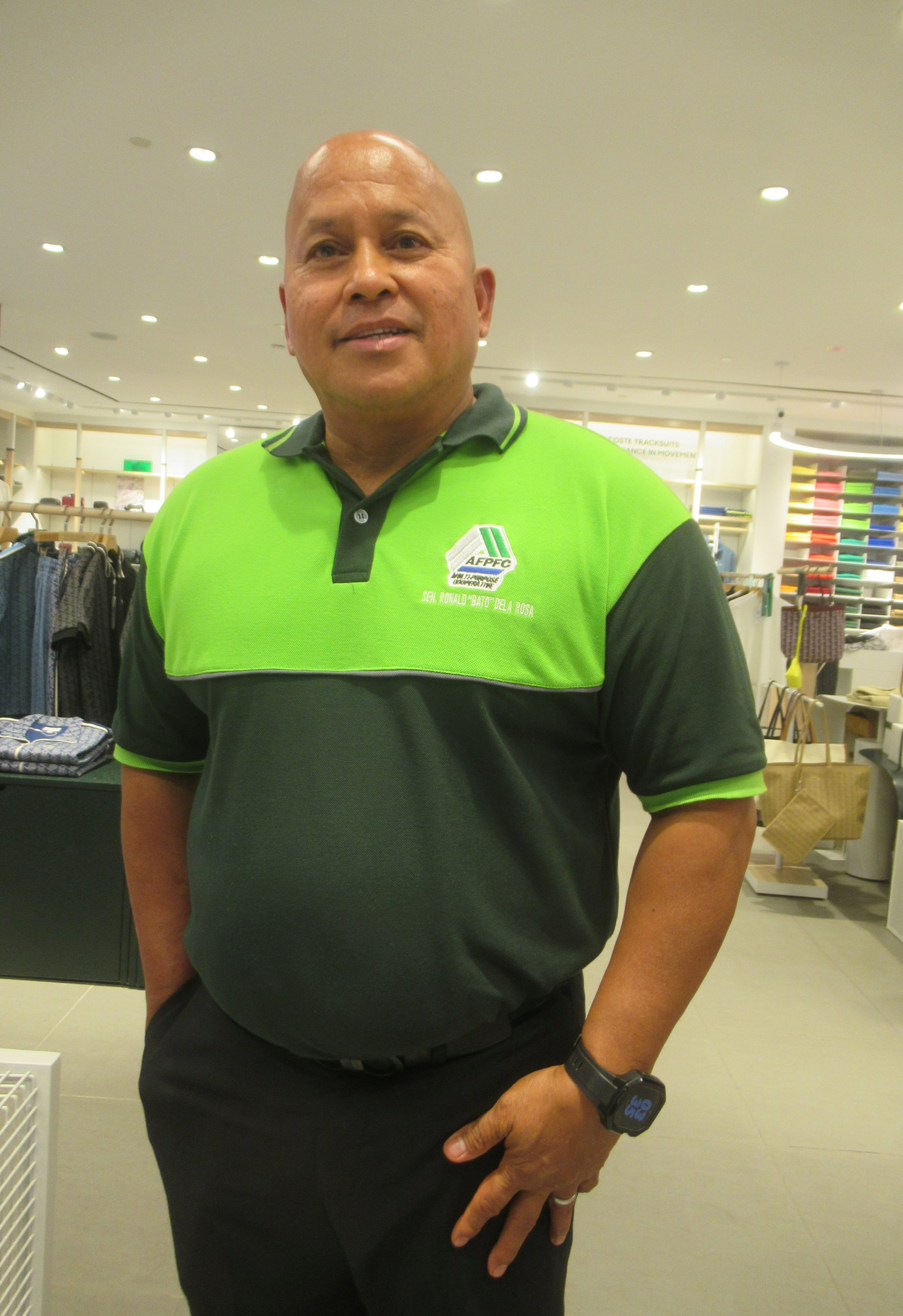
Dela Rosa at SM Megamall in 2024

Dela Rosa has been married to Nancy Johnson Comandante since 1989, and they have three children together. During his wedding, Rodrigo Duterte (who was mayor of Davao City at the time) stood as one of the principal sponsors. Duterte and Dela Rosa had known each other since 1986. He has described Duterte as "the greatest influence" in his career.

In May 2017, Dela Rosa's only son, Rock, entered the Philippine National Police Academy as a cadet.

On June 19, 2017, Dela Rosa was the guest of honor and speaker at the celebration of José Rizal's 156th birth anniversary. He claimed that he was related to the national hero through a common ancestor named Ines dela Rosa.

Dela Rosa is a Catholic. In a June 2016 radio interview on DZMM, Dela Rosa mentioned that he frequently goes to confession to seek forgiveness after he has killed criminals, declaring that he is "no cold-blooded killer".

Since he became the PNP chief, he has appeared or guested in several TV shows, most notably in the Trabahula segment of ABS-CBN's noontime variety show, It's Showtime, and GMA's Sunday variety show, Sunday PinaSaya, where he met Rodney "Dugong" Juterte, a comedic impersonation of President Rodrigo Duterte portrayed by comedian Jose Manalo.

Dela Rosa is a longtime fan of the PBA team Barangay Ginebra San Miguel.

== In popular culture ==
Ronald dela Rosa was portrayed by Robin Padilla in Adolfo Alix Jr.'s 2019 biographical action film Bato: The General Ronald dela Rosa Story. Padilla would later become a senator alongside dela Rosa in 2022.

In the 2022 historical action film Mamasapano: Now It Can Be Told, Dela Rosa was portrayed by Doc Che Lejano.

== Electoral history ==
Electoral history of Ronald dela Rosa
Year	Office	Party	Votes received				Result
Year	Office	Party	Total	%	P.	Swing	Result
2019	Senator of the Philippines	PDP	19,004,225	40.18%	5th	—N/a	Won
2025	Senator of the Philippines	PDP	20,773,946	36.22%	3rd	−3.96	Won
