= Filipino middle names =

History, popularity, and usage of middle names in the Philippines

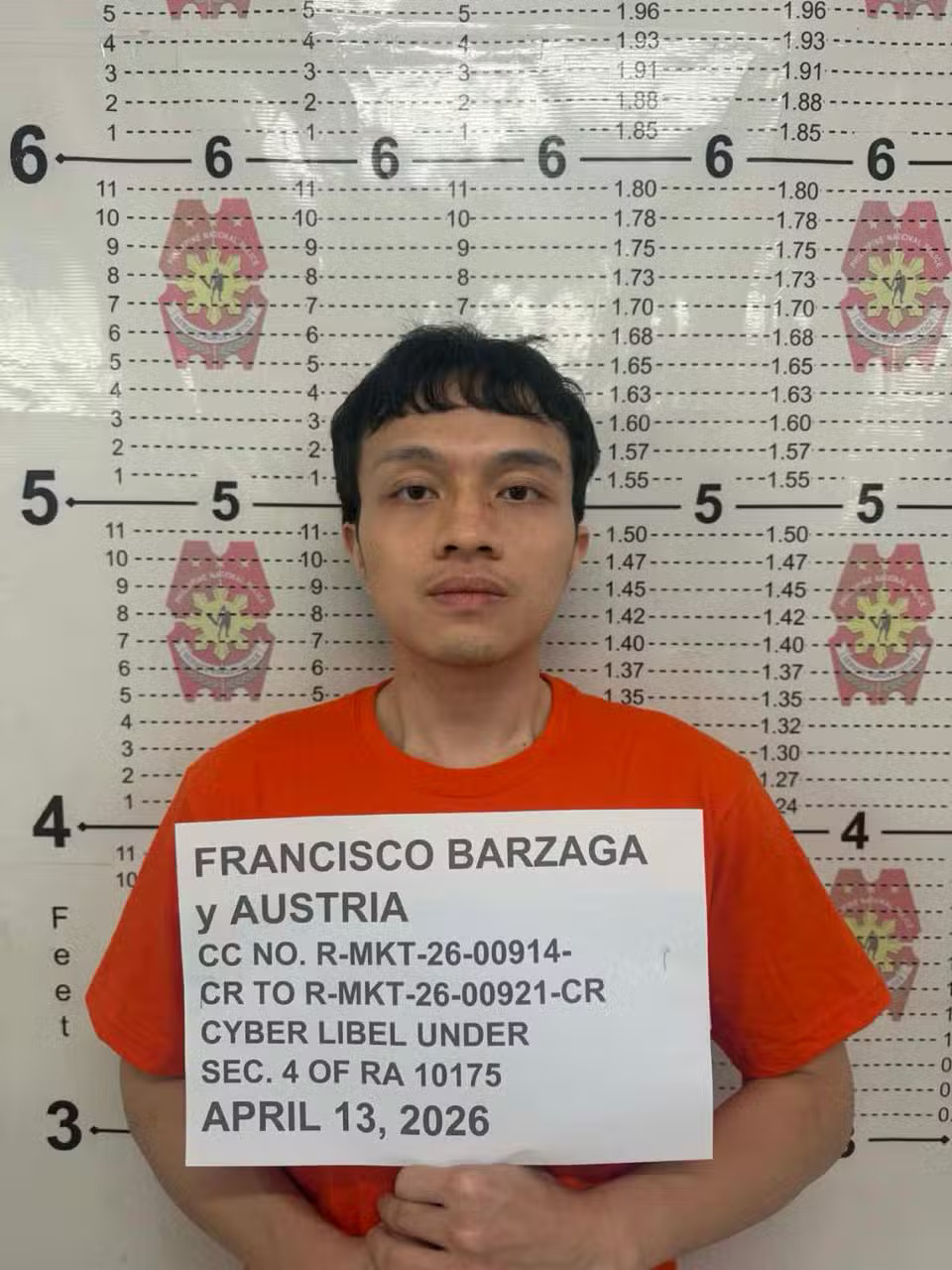
Mug shot of Kiko Barzaga with his name on a placard showing "Francisco Barzaga y Austria". Notice the use of Spanish order of paternal and maternal surnames, which are Barzaga and Austria, respectively, separated by the particle y

This is some background on the history, popularity, and usage of middle names in the Philippines.

== Maternal names ==
Christians (as well as certain Muslims, Chinese Filipinos, and others) in the Philippines formerly followed naming patterns practiced throughout the Spanish-speaking world (the practice of having the father's surname followed by the mother's surname, the two being connected by the particle "y", which means "and", such as Guillermo Cu-Unjieng y Araullo). If the second surname starts with i, y, hi or hy, the particle becomes e, following Spanish rules of euphony, as in Eduardo Dato e Iradier. Sometimes this second rule is overlooked.

This practice changed when the Philippines became a United States colony in the early 20th century. The order was reversed to follow the conventional American form "Christian name – Middle name – Surname", which in this case is actually "Christian name – Mother's surname – Father's surname" (Francisco Concepcion Casas or simply Francisco C. Casas). The conjunction y was dropped, although it is still used in certain contexts today (most notably names in criminal records, like the names used in placards used in mug shots, such as shown in the image on the right).

Currently, the middle name is usually, though not always, the mother's maiden name (followed by the last name which is the father's surname). This is the opposite of what is done in Spanish-speaking countries and is similar to the way surnames are done in Portugal and Brazil. The blending of American and Spanish naming customs results in the way Filipinos write their names today.

Furthermore, application forms for various legal documents define the first name as the "Christian name(s)", the middle name as the "mother's maiden surname" (this becomes the basis for the middle initial), and the surname as the "father's surname".

Bearing the mother's maiden surname as the middle name or middle initial is more important to a majority of Filipinos than to use one of the given names as a middle name or middle initial. Filipino culture usually allocates equal value to the lineage from both mother and father except in some prominent families who practice a strictly patriarchal system (usually of Spanish or Chinese heritage).

Exceptions apply in the case of children with single parents. Children born out of wedlock bear their mother's surname as their surname, with no middle name. The unmarried father must resort to legal and administrative procedures if he desires to acknowledge the child as his own and for the child to be registered with his surname (in which case the child will use the mother's surname as the middle name). Exceptions also apply to Filipino children who have non-Filipino descent.

== Maiden and married names ==
When a woman marries, she may: use her maiden first name and surname and add her husband's surname; use her maiden first name and her husband's surname; or use her husband's full name, but prefixing a word indicating that she is his wife, such as "Mrs." She may also decline to adopt her husband's surname and continue to use her maiden name since there is no law in the Philippines which obligates a married woman to use the surname of her husband.

- A woman may use her birth surname after marriage. However, once she has opted to use the surname of her husband, she shall continue using it until her marriage with her husband is validly terminated, such as through annulment, subject to certain conditions.
- All children from this marriage will automatically have the mother's birth surname as their middle name, and the father's surname as their surname.

Until the middle of the 20th century, it was common for married Filipino women to insert the particle "de" ("of") between her maiden surname and husband's surname (as in Margarita Mangahas de Santos or Margarita M. de Santos), another common Spanish naming custom. However, this practice is no longer common.

Married Filipino women who are professionals may choose to hyphenate their surnames (such as Margarita Mangahas – Santos, instead of simply Margarita Santos or Margarita M. Santos), at least in professional use, and use it socially even if legal documents follow a different naming pattern. This practice allows others to identify them after their marriage and helps others keep track of their professional achievements; otherwise, her unmarried and married names would seem to refer to two different persons (Margarita Gomez Mangahas as compared to Margarita Mangahas-Santos).

== Middle initials ==
Before digitization of records, middle initials and sorting of surnames follow the first letter of the name after Hispanic de, dela, del, delos. For example, the name Jose delos Santos dela Cruz is shortened as Jose S. dela Cruz and surname sorted on the letter C. Today, the middle initial must be the letter D (Jose D. dela Cruz) and surname sorted in the letter D. There have been a few documented exceptions, such as Benigno S. Aquino III, Jose P. Laurel, and Manuel L. Quezon, whose middle initials actually stand for their second given names, that is, Western-style middle names Simeon, Paciano, and Luis respectively.
