= Jose Hontiveros =

Filipino lawyer, jurist and politician

The Honorable Jose M. Hontiveros
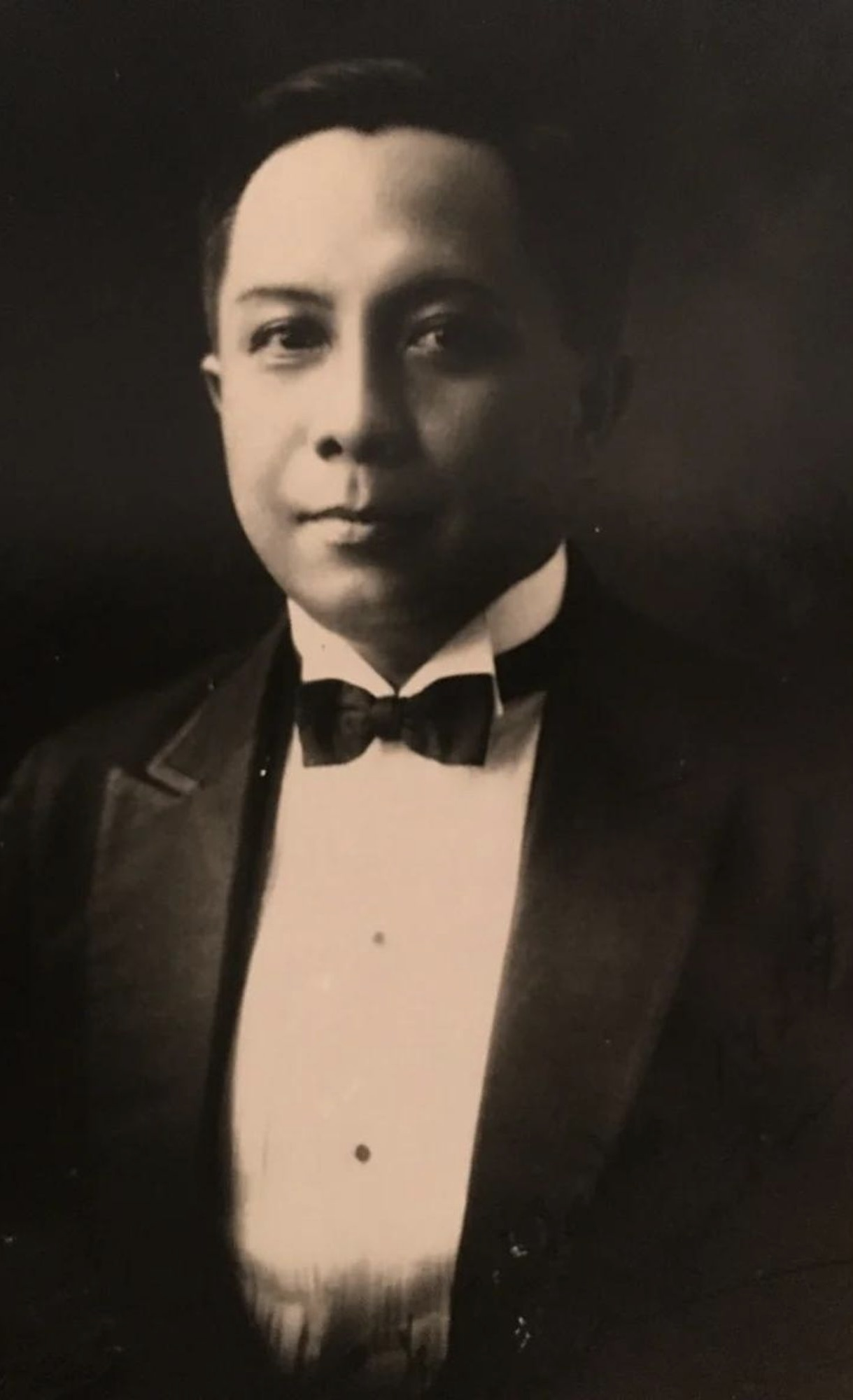

Senator of the Philippines from the 7th District
- In office 6 June 1922 – 5 June 1928 Serving with José María Arroyo; Jose Ledesma
- Preceded by: Jose Altavas
- Succeeded by: Antonio Belo

5th Governor of Capiz
- In office 1916–1919
- Preceded by: Jose Altavas
- Succeeded by: Manuel Roxas

55th Associate Justice of the Supreme Court of the Philippines
- In office 25 June 1946 – 16 October 1947
- Appointed by: Manuel Roxas
- Preceded by: Delfin Jaranilla
- Succeeded by: Fernando Jugo

Personal details
- Born: March 19, 1889 Tangalan, Capiz, Captaincy General of the Philippines
- Died: May 21, 1954 (aged 65) Manila, Philippines
- Resting place: Loyola Memorial Park Marikina, Philippines
- Party: Demócrata
- Relations: Daisy Avellana (daughter); Eduardo Hontiveros (son); Nita Hontiveros-Lichauco (daughter); Lamberto Avellana (son-in-law); Alejandro Lichauco (son-in-law); Jose Mari Avellana (grandchild); Maan Hontiveros (grandchild); Risa Hontiveros (grandchild); Pia Hontiveros (grandchild); Allan Cosio (grandson-in-law)

Jose Maria Miraflores Hontiveros (Tagalog pronunciation: [hɔˈsɛ ɔntɪˈvɛrɔs]; 19 March 1889 – 21 May 1954) was a Filipino lawyer, jurist and politician who was a Senator of the Insular Government of the Philippine Islands; a 1934 Constitutional Convention delegate who drafted the 1935 Constitution of the Commonwealth of the Philippines and an Associate Justice of the Supreme Court of the Third Republic of the Philippines.

He was the father of National Artist of the Philippines for Theater and Film Daisy Hontiveros-Avellana, Filipino Jesuit composer, musician and Presidential Medal of Merit Awardee Eduardo Hontiveros and Philippine Animal Welfare Society Founder and President Nita Hontiveros-Lichauco. He was also the grandfather of actor and director Jose Mari Avellana, TV host, journalist & business executive Maan Hontiveros, politician Risa Hontiveros and journalist Pia Hontiveros.

== Early life and education ==
Hontiveros was born José María Isturis Miraflores Hontiveros in Tangalan, Capiz (now a part of Aklan) on 19 March 1889 to Leon Miraflores and Genoveva Hontiveros. He attended the Colegio de Nuestra Señora del Rosario in Kalibo (Class of 1901), the Liceo de Manila High School (Class of 1905) and received his Bachelor of Laws degree from the University of Santo Tomas, where he graduated cum laude in 1911 at the age of 22 and placed first in the bar examinations the same year, with the rating of 99.69% average.

== Law and Judicial career ==
As a lawyer, Hontiveros accepted cases of the poor, free of charge. He was practicing his profession when the American administration noticed his success, and extended to him an appointment as Justice of the Peace of Capiz in 1913. He was also appointed Municipal Judge of Antique, Iloilo, Cebu, Negros Occidental, Negros Oriental and Zamboanga.

After serving his term as Governor of Capiz in 1919, he returned to his practice and joined the law firm of Montinola and Hontiveros, which had Ruperto Montinola- "the colossus of the South" as the senior partner; until 1924.

After serving his term as Senator of the Philippines in 1928, he formed his own law firm, into which he took two outstanding practitioners, Abeto and Tirol, as partners.

Hontiveros accepted the appointment as Auxiliary Judge of the Court of First Instance in 1929. His eventual promotion to the position of proprietary judge came after two years, when he was named to the 19th judicial district and in 1933 to the 22nd judicial district.

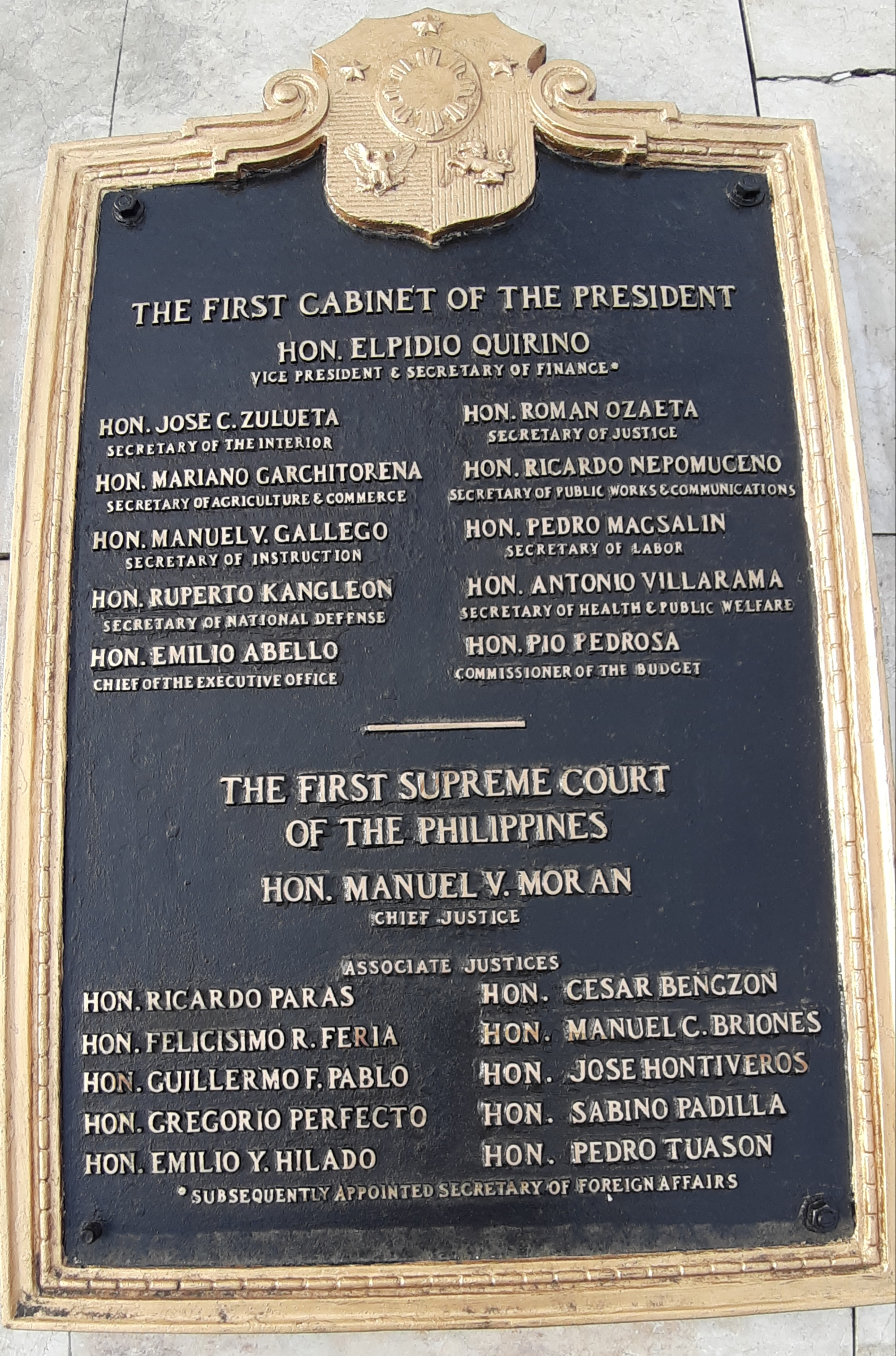
Historical Marker dedicated to the First Cabinet of the President and the First Supreme Court of the Philippines

He held several positions in the judiciary before being appointed as an Associate Justice of the Court of Appeals in 1936. He served until 1946, when he was appointed by President Manuel Roxas to become an Associate Justice of the Supreme Court, forming part of the First Supreme Court of the Philippines after it achieved its full independence from the United States on July 4, 1946. He retired from the bench the following year.

== Political career ==
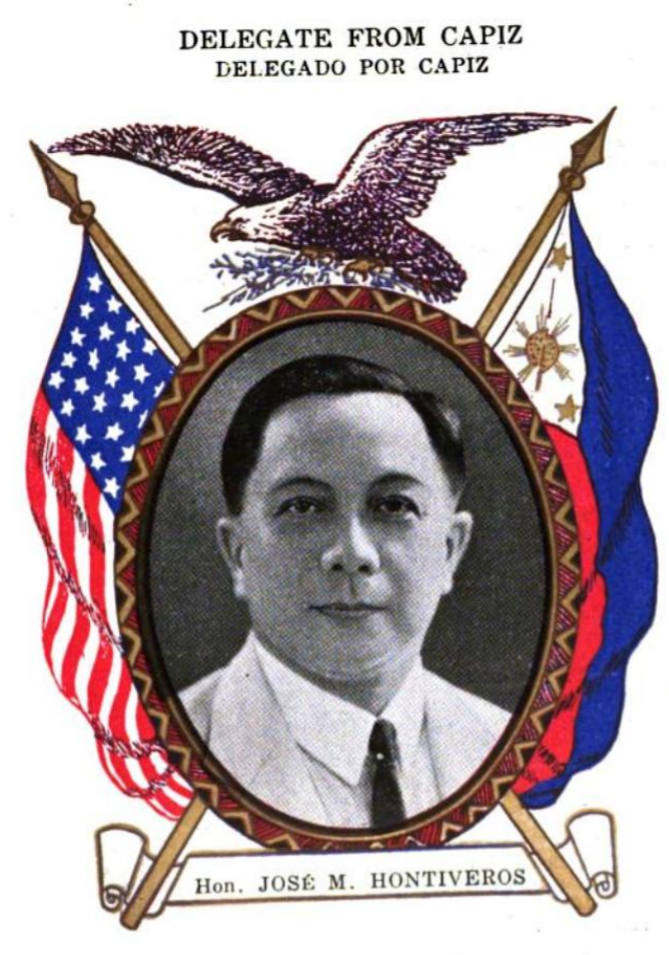
Hontiveros as a delegate to the Philippine Constitutional Convention, published by Benipayo Press (c. 1935)

Hontiveros had the reputation of being a very honest politician. After proving himself successful in the courts, the then 27-year-old Hontiveros was urged by the people of his province to run for Governor of Capiz, a position he served in from 1916 to 1919. He was the first Aklanon governor of Capiz. During his term, he devoted his time and efforts to improving the social and economic conditions of his constituents by building roads connecting the towns to the provincial capital, constructing government buildings for schools and markets, as well as bridges.

After serving as Governor, he went back to the practice of law which extended to the provinces surrounding Capiz where he gained popularity and renown. In 1922, he was prevailed upon to seek a senatorial bid and was elected to the Philippine Senate as a Senator from the 7th Senatorial District, comprising Iloilo, Capiz and Romblon provinces, and served until 1928.

He was an elected delegate of the 3rd District of Capiz to the Philippine Constitutional Convention of 1934 and took an active part in framing The 1935 Philippine Constitution for the government of the Commonwealth of the Philippines, a former territory of the United States. Availing of his scholarly and legalistic acumen, he was named as the Chairman of the Comparative Study of Constitutions, Vice Chairman of the Committee on Judicial Power, and a ranking member of the Committee on Constitutional Guarantees and Sponsorship. He was also a member of the Committee on Style. As Chairman of the Comparative Study of Constitutions, he conducted painstaking researches with the assistance of the members of the committee on constitutional matters. As Vice Chairman of the committee on Judicial Power, he was instrumental in the coordination of the work of the constituent body and in the adoption of measures calculated to bring about a more efficient and independent judiciary.

== World War II Imprisonment ==
During the Japanese occupation, Hontiveros was picked up, detained and interrogated at Fort Santiago by Japanese soldiers seeking information on the whereabouts of his sons who were part of the guerrilla resistance. Hontiveros suffered a stroke prior to his detention and so to stay upright, his two youngest children stayed with him, sitting with their backs to him so that he can lean on them, all together on the floor in a tiny cell with several others.

== Family life ==
Hontiveros was married to violinist Vicenta Ruiz Pardo, and had ten children. Of their offsprings, their eldest child Daisy Hontiveros-Avellana, became a famous theater actress and director, and was awarded National Artist for Theater. Eduardo Hontiveros, their sixth child, became a Jesuit priest and was known as the Father of Filipino Liturgical Music, and an Awardee of the Presidential Medal of Merit. Their eighth child, Nita Hontiveros-Lichauco, founded and became President of the Philippine Animal Welfare Society, the premier non-government organization for animal welfare in the country and was subsequently known as the Mother of Animal Welfare in the Philippines.

Hontiveros' notable sons-in-law include National Artist for Theater and Film Lamberto Avellana and Harvard-educated lawyer and economist Alejandro Lichauco, who was an elected delegate of the 1st District of Rizal to the Constitutional Convention of 1971 (which was called to change the 1935 Philippine Constitution, which Hontiveros took part in framing).

Other notable members of his family include his grandchildren: actor and director Jose Mari Avellana; tv host, journalist and business executive Maan Hontiveros; writer and Palanca Award winner David Hontiveros; journalist and stateswoman Risa Hontiveros (who became a Senator like him), journalist Pia Hontiveros (chief news correspondent of CNN Philippines), and grandson-in-law: painter, sculptor and Chevalier de l’Ordre des Arts et des Lettres- conferred artist Allan Cosio.

His great grandchildren include singer Barbie Almalbis and actor-model Luis Hontiveros.

== Death ==
He died on 21 May 1954 at the University of Santo Tomas Hospital in Manila after suffering a second stroke. He was buried at Loyola Memorial Park in Marikina.

== Memorial ==
On 21 June 1969, Republic Act No. 5602 was approved, changing the name of Loctugan Elementary School in Roxas City to Jose Hontiveros Elementary School.

On 7 March 1984, Batas Pambansa Blg. 671, which was a Republic Act changing the name of Tangalan Elementary School in Tangalan, Aklan to Justice Jose Hontiveros Memorial Elementary School was approved.

On 29 November 1989, Republic Act No. 6773 which was an Act changing the name of the Candual Elementary School in Barangay Candual, Panay, Capiz to Justice Jose Hontiveros Memorial School was enacted.

Several streets in the Philippines were also named in honor of Hontiveros.
