= 1966 FAMAS Awards =

Annual Filipino film awards ceremony

14th FAMAS Awards
- Date: 1966
- Site: Philippines

Highlights
- Best Picture: Ang Daigdig Ng Mga Api (CineMasters Inc.)
- Most awards: Ang Daigdig Ng Mga Api (9 wins)
- Most nominations: Ang Daigdig Ng Mga Api (10 nominations)

The 14th Filipino Academy of Movie Arts and Sciences Awards Night was held 1n 1966 for the Outstanding Achievements for the year 1965.

Ang Daigdig Ng Mga Api was the first film ever to win all the major awards in FAMAS history including the FAMAS Award for Best Picture, Best Director, Best Actor, Best Actress and Best Screenplay. It was also the first film to ever win four (out of six) acting awards from the FAMAS: Best Actor (Robert Arevalo), Best Actress (Barbara Perez), Best Supporting Actress (Leni Alano) and Best Child Actress (Ana Trinidad). This was also the first time a husband and a wife won the two top acting awards.

== Awards ==
=== Major Awards ===
Winners are listed first and highlighted with boldface.

Best Picture	Best Director
**Ang Daigdig Ng Mga Api — CineMasters Inc.**; Dugo sa Pantalan; Iginuhit ng Tadhana: The Ferdinand . Marcos Story — 777 Films; Iginuhit sa Buhangin — Hollywood-Far East Productions; Pilipinas kong Mahal — FPJ Productions; A Portrait of the Artist as Filipino — Diadem Pictures; Sa Kamay ng mga Kilabot: — Emar Pictures; Sa Oras ng Kadiliman — Hollywood-Far East Productions; Sapang Palay — Emar Pictures	**Gerardo de Leon — Ang Daigdig ng mga Api**; Romy Villaflor — Ana-Roberta; Van de Leon — Anghel sa Aking Balikat; Mariano Ponce — Dugo sa Pantalan; Armando De Guzman — Iginuhit sa Buhangin; Lauro Pacheco — Mila Rosa; Efren Reyes — Pilipinas kong Mahal; Lamberto V. Avellana — A Portrait of the Artist as Filipino; Cesar Gallardo — Sapang Palay
Best Actor	Best Actress
**Robert Arevalo — Ang Daigdig ng mga Api**; Amado Cortez — Dugo sa Pantalan; Luis Gonzales — Iginuhit ng Tadhana: The Ferdinand E. Marcos Story; Van de Leon — Maria Cecilia; Eddie Rodriguez — Mila Rosa; Dindo Fernando — Paalam sa Kahapon; Fernando Poe Jr. — Pilipinas kong Mahal; Conrad Parham — A Portrait of the Artist as Filipino; Romeo Vasquez — Sapagkat Ikaw ay Akin; Joseph Estrada — Sapang Palay	**Barbara Perez — Ang Daigdig ng mga Api**; Susan Roces — Ana-Roberta; Mila Ocampo — Dugo sa Pantalan; Gloria Romero — Iginuhit ng Tadhana: The Ferdinand E. Marcos Story; Lolita Rodriguez — Iginuhit sa Buhangin; Paraluman — Isinulat sa Dugo; Perla Bautista — Labanang Lalaki; Marlene Daudén — Mila Rosa; Daisy H. Avellana — A Portrait of the Artist as Filipino; Amalia Fuentes— Sapagkat ikaw ay akin
Best Supporting Actor	Best Supporting Actress
**Paquito Diaz — Ang Mananandata**; Ben Perez — Ang daigdig ng mga Api; Von Serna — Dugo sa Pantalan; Nello Nayo — Iginuhit sa Buhangin; Romeo Rivera — Paalam sa Kahapon; Vic Silayan — Pilipinas kong Mahal; Pianing Vidal — A Portrait of the Artist as Filipino; Larry Silva — Sa kamay ng mga kilabot; Fred Galang — Sapagkat ikaw ay akin; George Estregan — Sapang Palay	**Leni Alano— Ang daigdig ng mga Api**; Rosa Mia — Ana-Roberta; Eva Montes — Big boss; Patricia Mijares — Iginuhit sa Buhangin; Vilma Santos — Maria Cecilia; Mary Walter — Pilipinas kong Mahal; Naty Crame-Rogers — A Portrait of the Artist as Filipino; Elizabeth Flores — Sa oras ng kadiliman; Gloria Sevilla — Sapang Palay
Best in Screenplay	Best Story
**Pierre L. Salas— Ang daigdig ng mga Api**	**Pierre L. Salas— Ang daigdig ng mga Api**
Best Sound Engineering	Best Musical Score
**Flaviano Villareal — Iginuhit sa Buhangin**	**Tony Maiquez — Iginuhit Sa Buhangin**
Best Cinematography	Best Editing
**Mike Accion — Ang daigdig ng mga api**	**Fely Crisostomo — Iginuhit Sa Buhangin**
Best Child Performer	
**Ana Trinidad — Ang daigdig ng mga Api**	
