= Ding Lichauco =

Father of Nationalist Economics in the Philippines

- Born: Alejandro Aurelio Nieva Lichauco; October 20, 1927; San Miguel, Manila, Philippine Islands
- Died: May 22, 2015 (aged 87); Quezon City, Philippines
- Resting place: Basilica of the National Shrine of Our Lady of Mount Carmel Crypt, Quezon City
- Other name: Ding
- Education: Harvard University (B.A., L.L.B.)
- Occupations: Economist, politician, professor, lawyer, activist
- Known for: Economic nationalism
- Spouse: Nita Hontiveros-Lichauco
- Parents: Luis Nable Jose Lichauco (father); Alicia Nieva (mother)
- Relatives: Virginia Presentacion Nieva Lichauco (sister); Eduardo Nieva Lichauco (brother); Lamberto Avellana (brother-in-law); Jose Mari Avellana (nephew-in-law); Risa Hontiveros (niece-in-law); Pia Hontiveros (niece-in-law)

Alejandro Aurelio Nieva Lichauco (October 20, 1927 – May 22, 2015), also known as Ka Ding, was a Filipino economist, and activist who first promoted economic nationalism. He pushed for freedom against the American Parity Rights Amendment. He joined the 1971 Constitutional Commission as a commissioner but later opposed president Ferdinand Marcos and the dictatorship during martial law.

In addition to his work in economic nationalism, he was from a well-known Filipino political family, the Lichaucos.

== Early life and education ==
Lichauco was born on October 20, 1927 in 247 Aviles St., San Miguel, Manila. The home is now a hotel called La Casarita. He was born to Luis Nable Jose Lichauco and Alicia Nieva. Lichauco was the first of six children.

Lichauco studied his bachelor of arts degree in Economics at Harvard University. He later graduated at Harvard Law School. He married Nita Hontiveros on April 25, 1957 at Villa San Miguel, Mandaluyong, Rizal province. The marriage was presided by the Auxiliary Bishop Most Rev. Vicenta Reyes, D.D.

== Economic career ==
Lichauco led the way for economic nationalism together with his friend and cousin, Larry Henares. Both pushed for the Laurel-Langley Agreement, which amended the infamous Bell Trade Act by shortening the Parity Rights between American ownership being the same as that of Filipino citizens and set a deadline on July 3, 1974. Both led the way for nationalism on the economic front, while Jose W. Diokno and Jovito Salonga led the way on the political front against US Military bases, which ended in 1992 by a vote from Senate President Salonga in late 1991. Meanwhile, Teodoro Agoncillo and Renato Constantino would focus on Filipino nationalism on the academic front.

== Political career ==
Lichauco founded the Movement for the Advancement of Nationalism (MAN), which included Senator Lorenzo Tañada, Joma Sison, Francisco Nemenzo, and Renato Constantino. Lichauco became congressman for Rizal Province and was chosen to serve as commissioner for the Constitutional Commission to amend the Constitution. Lichauco however opposed the final draft seeing as it would enable a dictatorship for Ferdinand Marcos.

Among other stints, Lichauco was a policy director of the Philippine Chamber of Industries, director of the Institute of Economic Studies of Araneta University, senior consultant to the Congressional Economic Planning Office, and head of the policy research department of the National Economic Council (now NEDA). He refused to take part in the administration of Corazon Aquino due to his distrust of the new government.

== Academic career ==
Lichauco taught economics at UP Diliman in Quezon City. He likewise advocated for nationalism, which appealed to many like-minded students who opposed American or foreign interventionism in the economy.

== Later life and legacy ==
Lichauco succumed to multiple organ failure due to pneumonia at St. Luke's Medical Center in its original branch in Quezon City. The couple raised dogs and pets throughout their lives.

== Public image ==
Lichauco advocated for the steel industry and industrialization over the agriculture industry. He wanted to modernize the Philippine liberal cause in order to spur economic development. Lichauco believed once the Philippines produced its own raw material such as steel instead of importation, then the economy may become self-sufficient instead of being dependent on other countries like the United States.
