= Hontiveros =

Hontiveros is a surname. Notable people with the surname include:

- Dondon Hontiveros (born 1977), Filipino basketball player
- Eduardo Hontiveros (1923–2008), Filipino Jesuit composer and musician
- Risa Hontiveros (born 1966), Filipino politician
- Rodolfo Hontiveros Gabriel II, Filipino drag queen
- Pia Hontiveros (born 1967), Filipino news anchor/broadcast journalist.
