= Nita Hontiveros-Lichauco =

Mother of Animal Welfare in the Philippines

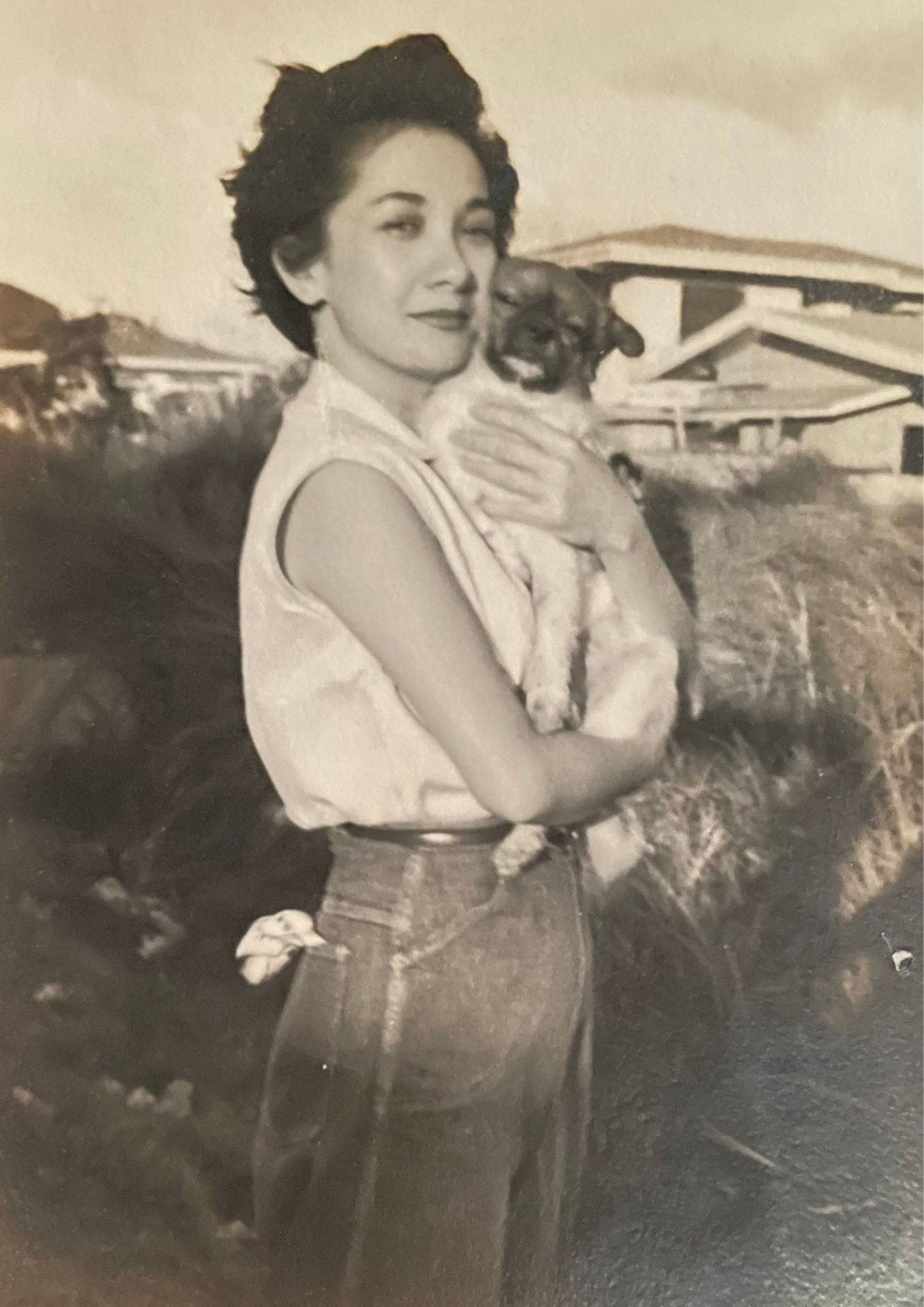
- Hontiveros-Lichauco with Essex (1953)
- Born: Maria Teresita Vicenta Pardo Hontiveros; August 11, 1927; Capiz, Capiz, Insular Government of the Philippine Islands, U.S.
- Died: October 11, 2020 (aged 93); Quezon City, Philippines
- Resting place: Basilica of the National Shrine of Our Lady of Mount Carmel Crypt, Quezon City
- Other names: Tata; Nita
- Organization: Philippine Animal Welfare Society
- Known for: Animal welfare advocacy
- Spouse: Alejandro Aurelio Lichauco (m. 1957; died 2015)
- Father: Jose Hontiveros
- Relatives: Daisy Avellana (sister); Eduardo Hontiveros (brother); Lamberto Avellana (brother-in-law); Jose Mari Avellana (nephew); Risa Hontiveros (niece); Pia Hontiveros (niece)

Maria Teresita Vicenta Pardo Hontiveros-Lichauco (August 11, 1927 – October 11, 2020), also known as Nita or Tata, was the president of the Philippine Animal Welfare Society. Her campaigns contributed to the passing of the Republic Act 8485 and the Animal Welfare Act of 1998. She was known as the Mother of Animal Welfare in the Philippines.

In addition to her advocacy work, she was from a well-connected Filipino family. Hontiveros-Lichauco was the daughter of a senator, and her husband was a representative at the Philippine Constitutional Convention of 1971. Two of her siblings also went on to have notable careers in acting and music.

== Early life and education ==
María Teresita Vicenta Pardo Hontiveros was born on August 11, 1927 in Capiz, in a city now known as Roxas City. Her father Jose M. Hontiveros was a lawyer, jurist, and politician, and her mother Vicenta Ruiz Pardo was a violinist.

She completed her elementary and high school education at the Assumption Convent. After her pre-law course, she considered studying medicine but decided to pursue music instead and completed an Associate in Arts degree at the University of Santo Tomas. She later studied French at Alliance Française.

== Family life ==
Hontiveros-Lichauco married Alejandro Aurelio Nieva Lichauco, a Harvard-educated economist and lawyer on April 25, 1957. The couple did not have children, although they took care of many animals together.

Her older sister Daisy Avellana was an actress and director honored as a National Artist of the Philippines for Theater and Film in 1999. Her older brother Eduardo Hontiveros became a Jesuit priest and was described as the father of liturgical music in the Philippines.

Her brother-in-law Lamberto Avellana was also an actor. Several of her nephews and nieces, such as Jose Mari Avellana, Risa Hontiveros, and Pia Hontiveros, also went on to have careers in arts, government, and journalism.

== Career ==
=== Animal welfare ===
The Philippine Animal Welfare Society (PAWS) was founded in 1954 by Muriel Jay, a British educator who was residing in the Philippines. Hontiveros-Lichauco became involved in the organization as a volunteer. Following Jay's return to England and the departure of other key members, PAWS slipped into dormancy. Hontiveros-Lichauco continued her rescue work with the help of her driver and two housemaids. She converted part of her home into an animal sanctuary, and provided food, shelter and medical treatment for abandoned and abused animals.

After decades of inactivity, Hontiveros-Lichauco reorganized PAWS in 1986. Together with a few volunteers who served as the first PAWS Board of Directors, she lobbied for the Animal Welfare Act of 1998. It took 13 years for the law to be passed. The Republic Act 8485 promoted the rights and welfare of all animals in the Philippines.

Under her tenure as president, PAWS established an animal rehabilitation center which offered subsidized veterinary services for low-income pet owners and gave temporary shelter to rescued animals. PAWS also launched other programs in support of the care and humane treatment of animals.

She wrote a monthly animal welfare column for Mr. & Ms. Magazine from 1982 to the early 2000s.

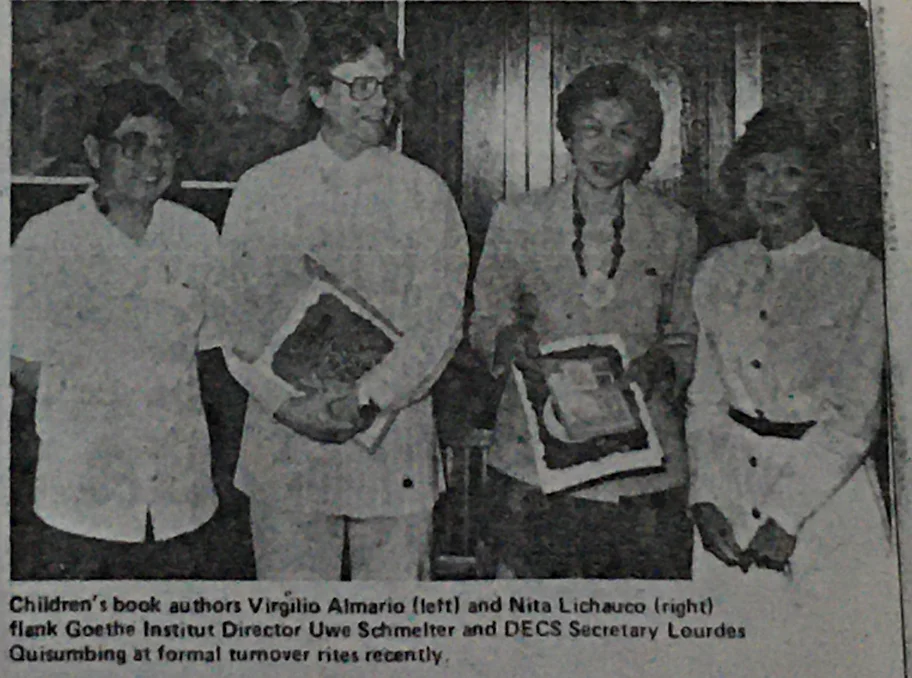
Nita Hontiveros-Lichauco (right) at the turnover rites for her book "The Boys and the Bees" with fellow children's book author Virgilio Almario, Goethe-Institut Director Uwe Schmelter and DECS Secretary Lourdes Quisumbing.

=== Other activities ===
Hontiveros-Lichauco starred as Maria Clara in the theatrical production of "A Rizal Sketchbook." The musical remembrance of the hero from Calamba premiered on June 17, 1955, with support from chapters of the Women's International League and the Knights of Rizal. She also had voice acting roles for radio commercials.

She authored a children's book titled The Boys and the Bees, which was published in 1989 by the Goethe Institute.

== Death ==
Nita was president of PAWS until her death on October 11, 2020. Her remains rest in the crypt of Basilica of the National Shrine of Our Lady of Mount Carmel located in Mariana, Quezon City.
