= Embarrassment of Riches =

Embarrassment of Riches may refer to:

- The Embarrassment of Riches, a 1906 play by Louis K. Anspacher
- Embarrassment of Riches (EP), a 2006 music album by Elephant Micah
- The Embarrassment of Riches, a 1987 history book by Simon Schama
- The Embarrassment of Riches (film), a 1918 silent film

== See also ==
- An Embarrassment of Riches, a 2000 novel by Charlson Ong
