= Loyola Memorial Park =

Cemetery in Marikina, Philippines

Loyola Memorial Park – Marikina
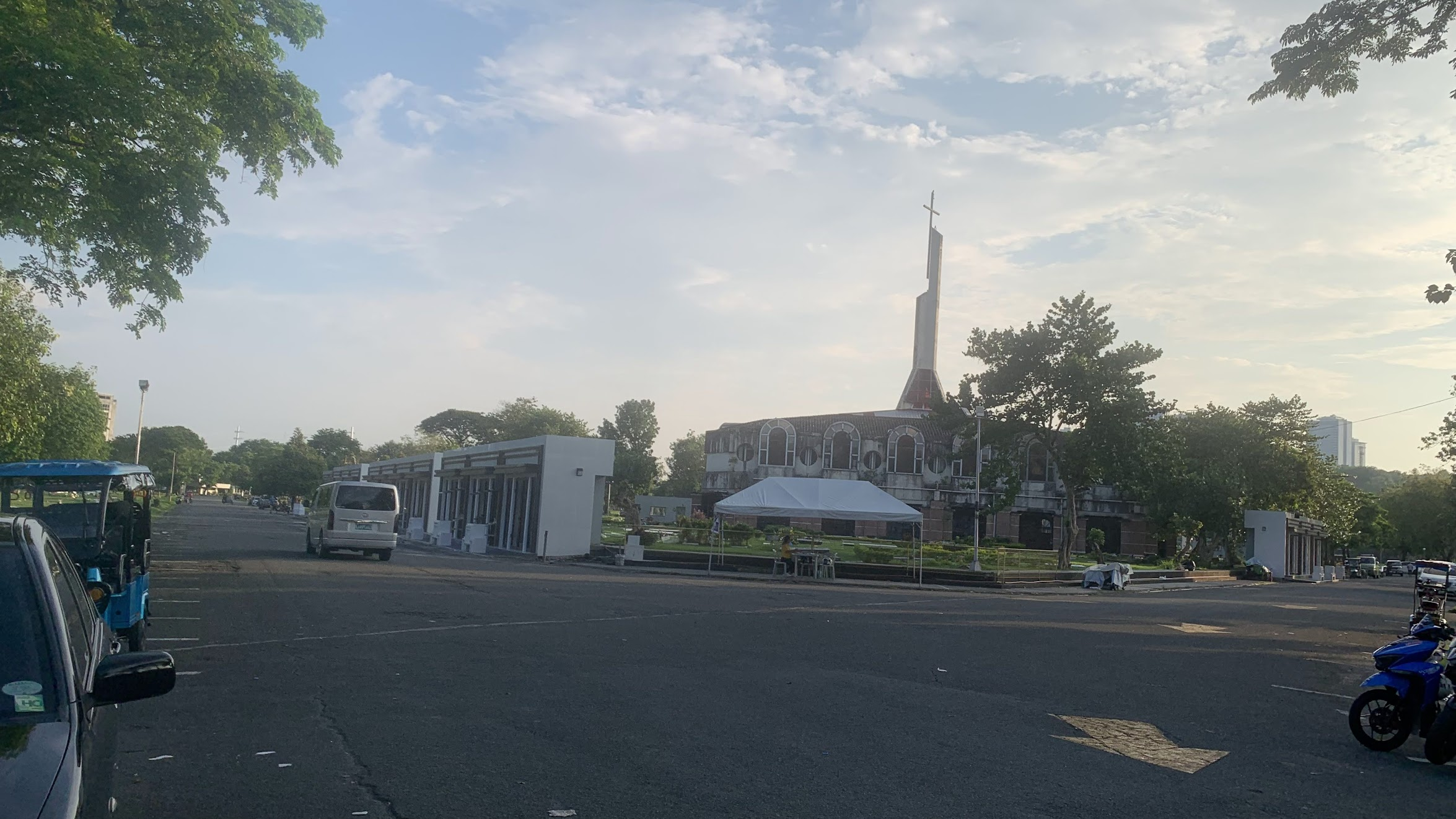
- Interactive map of Loyola Memorial Park – Marikina

Details
- Established: 1964
- Location: Marikina, Metro Manila
- Country: Philippines
- Coordinates: 14°38′18″N 121°05′11″E
- Owned by: Group Developers, Inc.
- Size: 38,000 m^{2} (410,000 sq ft)
- No. of graves: 60,000 (2019)

The Loyola Memorial Park is a cemetery and columbarium in Marikina, Metro Manila, Philippines. It was established in 1964, and was developed by Group Developers, Inc., which operates a second Loyola Memorial Park in Sucat, Parañaque. The Marikina park covers an area of 38,000 square meters (410,000 sq ft) with 60,000 burials as of 2019.

== Monuments and memorials ==
"The Redemption 1974"

The Loyola Memorial Park hosts "The Redemption 1974" by Eduardo Castrillo (a set of 13 massive cut and welded brass figures, 800 square meters, locally known as Last Supper of Jesus Christ monument which marks the complex's columbarium. The Bulaklak ng Pakikiramay (Flowers of Condolences) is an area within the park which is dedicated to Marikina City Police officers who have died. A monument for Fernando Amorsolo is located in the cemetery, a few meters away from his actual grave site. It features a statue of Amorsolo sculpted by National Artist Guillermo Tolentino.

== Notable burials ==
- Fernando Amorsolo (1892–1972), National Artist for Visual Arts
- Vicente Manansala (1910–1981), National Artist for Visual Arts
- Hernando R. Ocampo, (1911–1978), National Artist for Visual Arts
- Lamberto V. Avellana (1915–1991), National Artist for Film and Broadcast Arts
- Daisy Avellana (1917 –2013), National Artist for Theater
- Jose Hontiveros (1889–1954), former senator and former Associate Justice of the Supreme Court
- Gil Puyat (September 1, 1907 – March 23, 1980)
- Van de Leon (December 16, 1920 - March 5, 1981).
- Estanislao Fernandez (March 28, 1910 – July 28, 1982) Associate Justice of the Supreme Court of the Philippines
- Julie Vega (1968–1985), actress
- J. Amado Araneta (February 26, 1907 – November 17, 1985)
- Rogelio de la Rosa (1916–1986)
- Eddie del Mar (1919–1986), Actor, screenwriter, director, and filmmaker
- Jose Roy (July 19, 1904 – March 14, 1986)
- Francisco Dalupan Sr. (1895–1987)
  - Baby Dalupan (1923–2016), basketball player and coach
- Pilar Manalo Danao (1914–1987), First Head Choir Director of Iglesia ni Cristo
- Carmen Rosales (March 3, 1917 – December 11, 1991), actress and World War II guerilla fighter
- Jay Ilagan (1953–1992), actor
- Lorenzo Tañada (August 10, 1898 – May 28, 1992)
- Jaime de la Rosa (1921–1992), Filipino actor
- Matimtiman Cruz (August 21, 1921 – April 14, 1992),
- Gerardo Roxas Jr. (October 21, 1960 – April 4, 1993) with Gerardo Roxas (August 25, 1924 – April 19, 1982)
- Betty Go-Belmonte (1933–1994), Philippine Star founder
- Felipe Padilla de Leon (1912–1992), National Artist for Music
- J. Amado Araneta (1907–1985), businessman and developer of Araneta Center
- Filemon Lagman (1953–2001), communist politician
- Nida Blanca (1936–2001), actress
- Corazon Noble (1919–2001) beside Patrocinio Josefina Abad Ilagan
- César Ramírez (1925–2003), actor, comedian, production coordinator
- Amado Cortez (1927–2003), film actor
- Nick Joaquin (1917–2004), National Artist for Literature. Part of his ashes is buried at the Libingan ng mga Bayani.
- Joey Gosiengfiao (1941–2007), movie director, producer and writer
- Tiya Dely (1920–2008), radio drama personality
- Johnny Delgado (1948–2009), Veteran actor, comedian, and writer beside Victorina Marasigan Feleo, Luis R. Marasigan
- Francis Magalona (1964–2009), rapper with Saab Magalona's baby Luna Isabel Magalona Bacarro (February 8, 2018).
- Angelo Castro Jr. (1945–2012), ABS-CBN News anchor, and June Keithley (1947–2013)
- Tado Jimenez (1974–2014), comedian, actor, radio personality, businessman
- Miriam Defensor Santiago (1945–2016), former Senator
- German Moreno (1933–2016), Master Showman host, talent, actor
- Maico Buncio (10 September 1988 – 15 May 2011) motorcycle racer
- Ben Feleo (January 16, 1926 – September 21, 2011) film director and screenwriter
- Ernesto Maceda (1935–2016), former Senator, lawyer, and politician
- Amalia Fuentes (1940–2019), actress
- Renato Constantino (1919 – 1999) historian and writer.
- Karina Constantino David (1946–2019), chairperson of the Civil Service Commission of the Philippines
- Tomas Joson III (May 10, 1948 – July 23, 2020) Governor of Nueva Ecija.
- Luz Fernandez (1935–2022), film, theater, television, and radio actress of DZRH
- Gloria Sevilla (1932–2022), film actress
- Jose Fabian Cadiz (1961–2022), Former Vice Mayor of Marikina City, Former Marikina Councilor
- Martin Diño (July 25, 1957 – August 8, 2023), chairman of Subic Bay Metropolitan Authority
- Mike Enriquez (1951–2023), GMA News anchor
- Mario Dumaual (1958–2023), ABS-CBN News reporter
- Bayani Fernando (1946–2023), former chairman of MMDA, former secretary of Department of Public Works and Highways, former mayor of Marikina City, and former congressman of the 1st District of Marikina and founder of BF Corporation
- Sue Prado (1981–2026), actress
- Luis Taruc (1913–2005), founder of the Hukbalahap (remains transferred to his hometown of San Luis, Pampanga in 2018)
