= Philippines's 7th senatorial district =

- Former constituency for the Senate of the Philippines
- Provinces / Cities: Capiz, Iloilo, Romblon
- Population: 1,033,570 (1935)
- Electorate: 145,571 (1935)

Former constituency
- Created: 1916
- Abolished: 1934

Philippines's 7th senatorial district, officially the Seventh Senatorial District of the Philippine Islands (Spanish: Séptimo Distrito Senatorial de las Islas Filipinas), was one of the twelve senatorial districts of the Philippines in existence between 1916 and 1935. It elected two members to the Senate of the Philippines, the upper chamber of the bicameral Philippine Legislature under the Insular Government of the Philippine Islands for each of the 4th to 10th legislatures. The district was created under the 1916 Jones Law from the western Visayas provinces of Capiz and Iloilo. Romblon was added in 1917 upon its re-establishment as a regular province separate from Capiz.

The district was represented by a total of eight senators throughout its existence. It was abolished in 1935 when a unicameral National Assembly was installed under a new constitution following the passage of the Tydings–McDuffie Act which established the Commonwealth of the Philippines. Since the 1941 elections when the Senate was restored after a constitutional plebiscite, all twenty-four members of the upper house have been elected countrywide at-large. It was last represented by Ruperto Montinola and Potenciano Treñas of the Nacionalista Demócrata Pro-Independencia.

== List of senators ==
Seat A							Legislature	Seat B						
#	Image	Senator	Term of office		Party	Electoral history	Legislature	#	Image	Senator	Term of office		Party	Electoral history
#	Image	Senator	Start	End	Party	Electoral history	Legislature	#	Image	Senator	Start	End	Party	Electoral history
1		José Altavas	October 16, 1916	June 6, 1922	Nacionalista	Elected in 1916.	4th	1		Francisco Felipe Villanueva	October 16, 1916	June 3, 1919	Nacionalista	Elected in 1916.
1		José Altavas	October 16, 1916	June 6, 1922	Nacionalista	Elected in 1916.	5th	2		José María Arroyo	June 3, 1919	March 8, 1927	Nacionalista	Elected in 1919. Died.
2		Jose Hontiveros	June 6, 1922	June 5, 1928	Demócrata	Elected in 1922.	6th	2		José María Arroyo	June 3, 1919	March 8, 1927	Nacionalista; Colectivista	Elected in 1919. Died.
2		Jose Hontiveros	June 6, 1922	June 5, 1928	Demócrata	Elected in 1922.	7th	3		José B. Ledesma	July 21, 1927	June 2, 1931	Nacionalista; Consolidado	Elected in 1927 to finish Arroyo's term.
3		Antonio Belo	June 5, 1928	June 5, 1934	Nacionalista; Consolidado	Elected in 1928.	8th	3		José B. Ledesma	July 21, 1927	June 2, 1931	Nacionalista; Consolidado	Elected in 1927 to finish Arroyo's term.
3		Antonio Belo	June 5, 1928	June 5, 1934	Nacionalista; Consolidado	Elected in 1928.	9th	4		Ruperto Montinola	June 2, 1931	September 16, 1935	Demócrata	Elected in 1931.
4		Potenciano Treñas	June 5, 1934	June 10, 1934	Nacionalista; Demócrata Pro-Independencia	Elected in 1934. Died.	10th	4		Ruperto Montinola	June 2, 1931	September 16, 1935	Nacionalista; Demócrata Pro-Independencia	Elected in 1931.

== See also ==
- Senatorial districts of the Philippines
