= Antonio Belo =

Antonio Belo y Villaruz
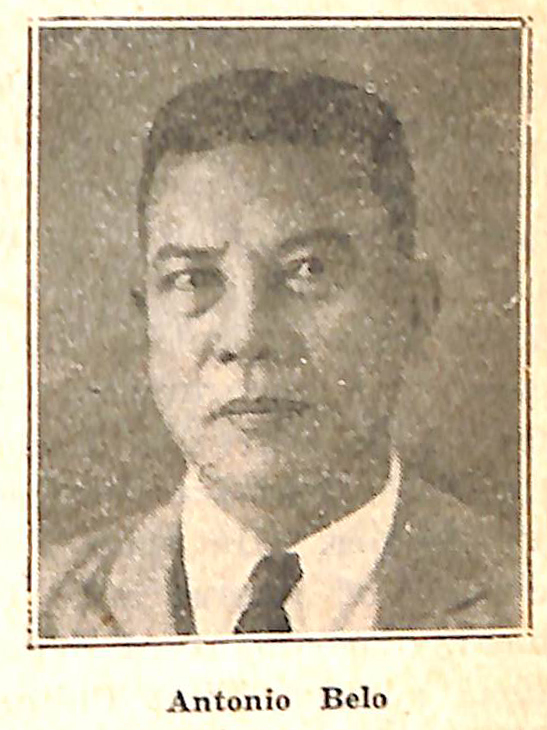

Senator of the Philippines from the 7th District
- In office June 5, 1928 – June 5, 1934 Serving with Jose Ledesma; Ruperto Montinola
- Preceded by: Jose Hontiveros
- Succeeded by: Potenciano Treñas

Member of the House of Representatives of the Philippine Islands from Capiz's 1st district
- In office October 16, 1916 – June 3, 1919
- Preceded by: Rafael Acuña
- Succeeded by: Antonio Habana

Personal details
- Born: January 11, 1877 Panay, Capiz, Captaincy General of the Philippines
- Died: 1944 (aged 66–67)
- Party: Nacionalista

Antonio Belo y Villaruz (January 11, 1877 – 1944) was a Filipino lawyer and politician who became Senator of the Philippines during the American occupation.

== Early life and education ==
He was born in Panay, Capiz on January 11, 1877. He obtained the degrees of Bachelor of Arts and Bachelor of Laws and subsequently worked as a lawyer.

== Political career ==
Belo held several legal and political positions such as municipal councilor of Romblon, Romblon; Justice of the Peace of Capiz, Capiz; and law clerk at the House of Representatives. In 1928, he was elected Senator from the 7th Senatorial District representing the provinces of Iloilo, Capiz and Romblon and served until 1934.
