= Jose Mari Avellana =

Filipino actor, screenwriter, director, production designer (born 1941)

- Born: Jose Mari Hontiveros Avellana; May 6, 1941
- Died: June 26, 2011 (aged 70)
- Other names: Joe Mari Avellana; Joe Avalon
- Occupations: Actor; director; screenwriter; production designer
- Parents: Lamberto V. Avellana (father); Daisy Avellana (mother)
- Relatives: Jose Hontiveros (grandfather); Eduardo Hontiveros (uncle); Nita Hontiveros-Lichauco (aunt); Risa Hontiveros (cousin); Pia Hontiveros (cousin)

Jose Mari Hontiveros Avellana (May 6, 1941 – June 26, 2011) was a Filipino actor, screenwriter, director, and production designer.

== Biography ==
Avellana was the son of National Artists director Lamberto V. Avellana and actress Daisy Avellana.

While still in college, he started out as a Radio announcer for DZFM Radio before turning to the stage and to acting. His first major movie role was that of evil drug lord Ming in Cirio H. Santiago's Blaxploitation epic TNT Jackson (1974).

This marked the beginning of a decade-long professional relationship with influential producer-director Cirio H. Santiago, during which Avellana took on various responsibilities. In many productions, he worked simultaneously as an actor, production designer and assistant director. Some of the more notable productions in which he acted include successful action-adventure outings such as Wheels of Fire (1985), Death Force (1978) and Bloodfist II (1990). In these movies made for an international audience he was mostly playing antagonists.

Later in his career, Avellana directed movies in Tagalog for the local market such as the family drama Kung Mawawala Ka Pa (1993) that won Best Picture at the 1993 Metro Manila Film Festival, Labanang Lalaki (1996) and the patriotic revolution tale Damong Ligaw (1997) that was awarded the FAMAS Centennial Award.

He was also a highly regarded theater actor. Until shortly before his death, he was seen on stage at the Repertory Philippines as Morrie Schwartz in a play based on Mitch Albom's book Tuesdays With Morrie, and in Nick Joaquin's A Portrait of the Artist as Filipino. He died on 26 June 2011 due to aneurysm. Avellana was 70.

== Stage names ==
Jose Mari Avellana also used the stage names Joe Mari Avellana and Joe Avalon.

== Awards and nominations ==
Year	Award Giving Body	Category	Nominated work	Result
1994	FAMAS Award	Best Director	Kung mawawala ka pa (1993)	Nominated
1998	FAMAS Award	Best Director	Damong ligaw (1997)	Nominated
1998	FAP Awards	Best Story Adaptation	Damong ligaw (1997)	Won
1998	YCC Award	Best Screenplay	Damong ligaw (1997)	Nominated
1998	Gawad Urian Award	Best Direction	Damong ligaw (1997)	Nominated
1998	Gawad Urian Award	Best Screenplay	Damong ligaw (1997)	Nominated
2003	Metro Manila Film Festival	Best Supporting Actor	Operation Balikatan (2003)	Won
2010	Gawad Urian Award	Best Supporting Actor	Colorum (2009)	Nominated
