= Presidential Medal of Merit =

Philippine order

- Ribbon of the medal
- Type: Medal
- Awarded for: See Award
- Presented by: Philippines
- Status: Currently constituted

Precedence
- Next (higher): Order of the Golden Heart
- Next (lower): Order of Lapu-Lapu and Order of the Knights of Rizal

The Presidential Medal of Merit (Pampanguluhang Medalya ng Merito) is an honor given by the Republic of the Philippines.

== History ==
The Presidential Merit Award was renamed the Presidential Medal of Merit by Executive Order 236 on September 19, 2003.

== Award ==
The Presidential Medal of Merit shall be conferred upon an individual, Filipino or foreign:

- a. for outstanding service to the President, the Administration or cabinet members;
- b. for gaining prestige for the country in an international event, in the fields of literature, the sciences, the arts, entertainment, and other civilian fields of endeavor that foster national pride and artistic excellence;
- c. who is a retiring cultural worker or artist, after serving the government in an official or advisory capacity, or a foreign artist who has promoted Philippine culture; or
- d. for acts of merit that enhance the prestige of the Republic of the Philippines, including heading the Philippine delegation or having contributed materially to the success of a major international conference or event that has brought prestige and honor to the country, including Presidential visits overseas and major international events held in the Philippines.

== Recipients ==
- Rosa Sevilla, 1948
- Aurora Quezon, 1949 (posthumous)
- Carlos P. Romulo, 1949
- Carmen de Luna, 1949, for her contributions to youth and education
- Jorge Bocobo, 1949
- Francisca Tirona-Benitez, 1949
- María Orosa, 1949 (posthumous)
- Jaime De Veyra, 1950
- Rebecca Parrish, 1950
- Sergio Osmeña, 1950
- Elpidio Quirino, 1955
- Emilio Aguinaldo, 1955
- Juan Nakpil, 1955
- Engracia Cruz-Reyes, 1955
- Trinidad Fernandez-Legarda, 1966
- Josefa Edralin-Marcos, 1966
- Gilopez Kabayao, 1969
- Amado T. Del Rosario, 1970
- Guillermo Tolentino, 1970
- Vicente Madrigal, 1970
- Scout Oscar M. Alcaraz, 1970 (posthumous)
- International Rice Research Institute, 1972
- Manuel Elizalde, 1972
- Kenneth Lee Pike, 1974
- Leonides Sarao Virata, 1976 (posthumous)
- Romulo Espaldon, 1981
- Herbert W. Armstrong, 1983
- Cecilio T. Arillo, 1983
- Gabriel Elorde, 1984
- Paeng Nepomuceno, 1984
- Ossie Mills, 1987
- Lea Salonga, 1990
- Cecile Licad, 1991
- Maniya Barredo, 1994
- Haydee Yorac, 1997
- Teresita de Castro, 1998
- Armand Fabella, 1998
- Hermogenes Esperon, 1998
- Edelmiro Amante, 1998
- Emilio Osmeña, 1998
- Epimaco Velasco, 1998
- Franklin Drilon, 1998
- Leonardo Quisumbing, 1998
- Victor Sumulong, 1998
- Ramon Montaño, 1998
- Jang Young-sik, 1998
- Jesus Dureza, 1998
- Philip Watts, 2001
- Robert A. Underwood, 2002
- Manny Pacquiao, 2003
- Dr. Josette Biyo, 2003
- René van der Linden, 2005
- Abdulmari Imao, 2005
- Alexander Magno, 2005
- Alfonso Yuchengco, 2005
- Andres Bautista, 2005
- Carmen Pedrosa, 2005
- Efraim Tendero, 2005
- Gilberto Duavit Sr., 2005
- Mel Senen Sarmiento, 2005
- Oscar Rodriguez, 2005
- Pablo Garcia, 2005
- Pedro Romualdo, 2005
- Raul Lambino, 2005
- René Azurin, 2005
- Sergio Apostol, 2005
- Vicente Paterno, 2005
- Anita Magsaysay-Ho, 2006
- Fernando Zóbel de Ayala y Montojo, 2006 (posthumous)
- Juvenal Sanso, 2006
- Nena Saguil, 2006 (posthumous)
- Oscar Yatco, 2006
- Romeo Tabuena, 2006
- apl.de.ap, 2006
- will.i.am, 2006
- Benjamin Cayetano, 2006
- Linda Lingle, 2006
- Francisco Bustamante, 2006
- Monique Lhuillier, 2006
- Federico Alcuaz, 2006
- Manuel Conde, 2006 (posthumous)
- Malang, 2006
- Alfonso Cusi, 2007
- Antonio Cuenco, 2007
- Nerissa Soon-Ruiz, 2007
- Raul del Mar, 2007
- Thadeo Ouano, 2007
- Tomas Osmeña, 2007
- Juan Ignacio Pérez Iglesias, 2007
- Reverend Fr. Eduardo Hontiveros, SJ, 2008 (posthumous)
- Araceli Estrada Villanueva, 2009
- Francis Magalona, 2009 (posthumous)
- Jaime Augusto Zóbel de Ayala II, 2009
- Leland Yee, 2010
- Lilia de Lima, 2010
- Ambeth Ocampo, 2013
- Peter Irving Corvera, 2016
- Arnel Paciano D. Casanova, 2016
- Araceli Limcaco-Dans, 2018
- Hidilyn Diaz, 2021
- Rolando Joselito Bautista, 2022
- Carmencita Padilla, 2023
- Whang-od, 2024
- Carlos Yulo, 2024
- Nora Aunor, 2025 (posthumous)
- Pilita Corrales, 2025 (posthumous)
- Gloria Romero, 2025 (posthumous)
- Margarita Fores, 2025 (posthumous)
