= Potenciano Treñas =

Filipino lawyer and politician (1894-1934)

The Honourable Potenciano Treñas
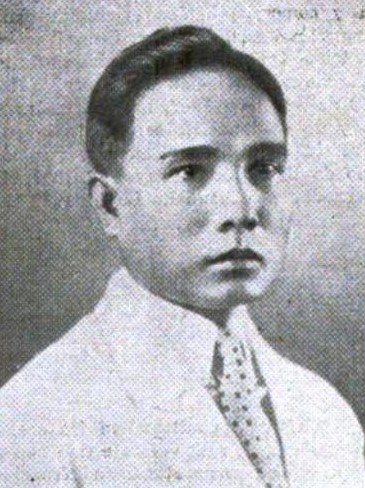
- Senatorial portrait of Treñas, published by Benipayo Press, c. 1935

Senator of the Philippines from the 7th District
- In office 5 June 1934 – 10 June 1934 Serving with Ruperto Montinola
- Preceded by: Antonio Belo
- Succeeded by: Vacant. Office abolished at the end of his term

Personal details
- Born: Potenciano Treñas y Torres; May 13, 1894 Tigbauan, Iloilo, Captaincy General of the Philippines
- Died: June 10, 1934 (aged 40)
- Party: Nacionalista

Potenciano Torres Treñas (born Potenciano Treñas y Torres; May 13, 1894 – June 10, 1934) was a Filipino lawyer and politician.

== Biography ==
Potenciano Treñas was born in Tigbauan, Iloilo to Tomas Treñas and Justa Torres. He finished his secondary course at the Ateneo de Manila and studied law at home, passing the bar in 1916.

He was appointed to become a member of the Iloilo Provincial Board in 1928 and was elected to the Philippine Senate from the 7th District in 1934. However, he contracted a disease during his campaign and died just five days after assuming office.

== Family ==
He was married to Estrella Blancaflor. His grandson, Jerry Treñas, is currently serving as mayor of Iloilo City since 2019, having previously served in the post from 2001 to 2010 and represented the city in the House of Representatives from 2010 to 2019.
