= Maico Buncio =

Filipino motorcycle racer

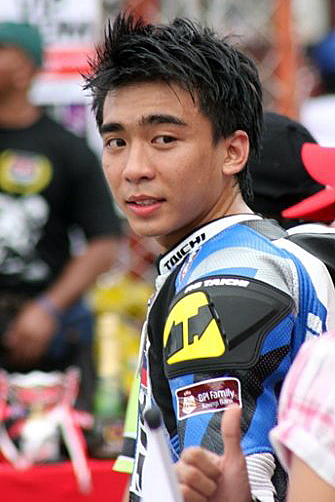
- Maico Buncio in the IRGP 2009 Race at the Carmona Racing Circuit, Cavite, Philippines
- Born: Maico Greg Tecson Buncio; September 10, 1988; Mandaluyong, Philippines
- Died: May 15, 2011 (aged 22); Clark International Speedway; Mabalacat, Pampanga, Philippines
- Cause of death: Motorcycle crash
- Other name: Maiko
- Occupations: Motorcycle racer, businessman
- Years active: 2002–2011

Maico Greg Tecson Buncio (September 10, 1988 – May 15, 2011) was a Filipino motorcycle racer and four-time Philippine national superbike champion. He died after a race accident in Clark, Pampanga Philippines on 15 May 2011.

== Family ==
From Mandaluyong, Buncio is the son of Gregorio "Yoyong" Buncio, a motorcycle racer, mechanic, and modifier. His mother is Mylene Buncio. He has four other siblings, namely Lourdes, Shara, Jacquelyn, and Barny .

== Early life and career ==
Buncio's father gave him the name "Maico" from a European motorcycle brand. At the age of three, he had started to learn riding motorcycles before bicycles. His training began early under the mentoring of his experienced father.

Buncio started his motocross competition career at the age of eight. He won first place in the 1996 FBO Motorcross Series 50cc category for ten years old and below held at the TRAKSNIJAK Race Track in Tagaytay.

At the age of 14, Buncio represented the Philippines in Perris, California at the FMF Memorial Day Motorcross Races, winning first place in the Mini Class 85cc for the 14 years old and below category.

== Education ==
Buncio took up Bachelor of Science in commerce, Major in Entrepreneurship at the University of Santo Tomas. Buncio was a consistent honor student since elementary and studied in OB Montessori until high school. He also finished his computer New Media Design Course from Phoenix One Knowledge Solutions in Makati on his latter years.

== Career ==
Buncio was the sole representative of the Philippines in the 2004 Yamaha ASEAN Cup held at Shah Alam, Malaysia, where he raced against competitors from Malaysia, Singapore, Thailand, and Indonesia. He won the fourth overall title for the country despite having to start from the back of the grid and having to race against five representing riders each from the other competing countries. This feat earned him the title Rookie of the Year from the organizers of said event.

Yamaha rider Buncio dominated the underbone racing 150 cc category for four years since 2006 before placing second to Suzuki rider Johnlery Enriquez in the 2010 event sponsored by Motorcycle Taipei Research Team and PAGCOR Sports.

Buncio also broke records at the 3.2-kilometer Batangas Racing Circuit with a lap time of one minute, 49 seconds (400cc Superbike category) and two minutes, seven seconds (Underbone category).

2007 was the "most memorable" for Buncio when, at the age of 19, he broke the winning streak of ten-time Rider of the Year, Jolet Jao in the 2007 Shell Advance Superbikes Series. Buncio held the Superbike National Champion title for the next three years.

Buncio also finished a race in the AMA Superbike 600cc class in Laguna Seca U.S.A. in September 2008.

In 2009, Buncio was chosen as the endorser for Accel Sports Sporteum Philippines Inc.

Buncio was also awarded the Golden Wheel Awards Driver of the Year in 2010 and 2011.

Buncio has ridden mostly Yamaha bikes in his entire career with Factory Yamaha and YRS until he signed for Team Suzuki Pilipinas in late 2010

Buncio was also a businessman, opened his own YRS Motorcycle Racing shop in Caloocan, and was a race director of the Moto ROC underbone race series. He was a big fan of Valentino Rossi of MotoGP and always dreamed to compete in international motorcycle racing.

Buncio often carried his trademark logo and the iconic race number "129" usually in a form of a sticker on his apparel and motorcycles.

== Death ==
Buncio fell a high speed accident on 14 May 2011 during the Superbike qualifying race at the Clark International Speedway Racing Circuit.

While passing a semi-straight right hand sweeper on the speedway, Buncio's Suzuki GSX-R 600 motorbike slid and crashed into the run-off section. He was thrown off his bike and landed on an unfinished barrier in the race track. Buncio crashed onto a protruding steel rod of the barrier, which punctured his internal organs, fatally damaging his kidney and liver.

Buncio was thrown off some 100 meters from his bike and was impaled on a protruding reed bar in an unfinished barrier on the Clark Speedway Circuit. He was rushed to a nearby hospital in Mabalacat and transferred to the UST Hospital in the wee hours of 15 May and was pronounced dead at 3:57 PM on the same day due to massive internal bleeding. The father of the late superbike champion Maico Buncio raised questions over the first aid procedure done on the rider during his fatal crash at the Clark Speedway Circuit. He said that the Aeromed's medical response team pulled the victim's body from the steel bar. This, he said, might have caused his son's death. The bar punctured his body and damaged his kidney and liver. Instead of cutting the steel bar to free Maico, the AeroMed emergency staffers decided to pull the young motorcycle champion free from his entanglement. This, they learned later, caused massive internal damage to Maico's organs and prompted him to scream in pain.

Dr. Reynante Mirano, chief of St. Luke's Hospital Emergency Medicine, said that instead of pulling Buncio's body from the protruding metal, the medics should have cut the steel bar.

Buncio left a memorable quote to his fellow riders "Never stop riding, because I didn't."

Buncio's wake was held in the Loyola Memorial Chapels in Makati and he was laid to rest in the Loyola Memorial Park in Marikina on 21 May 2011. A motorcade organized by his fellow riders marked his funeral procession.
