= Jose Ledesma =

Filipino lawyer, politician, diplomat

Senator of the Philippines from the 7th District
- In office 21 July 1927 – 2 June 1931 Serving with Jose Hontiveros; Antonio Belo
- Preceded by: Jose Maria Arroyo
- Succeeded by: Ruperto Montinola

9th & 20th Governor of Iloilo
- In office 1945–1945
- Preceded by: Patricio Confesor
- Succeeded by: Tomas Vargas
- In office 1925–1927
- Preceded by: Ruperto Montinola
- Succeeded by: Jose Lopez-Vito

Personal details
- Party: Nacionalista

Jose Benedicto Ledesma was a Filipino politician who served as governor of the province of Iloilo and senator.

== Biography ==
Jose Ledesma completed a bachelor's degree in law and passed the Philippine bar entrance exam in 1912. From the same year he was also a member of the Iloilo Provincial Board. From 1925 to 1927 he was governor of Iloilo. When Senator Jose Maria Arroyo died in 1927, Ledesma was elected during a special election on July 21, 1927, for the remainder of his term in the Philippine Senate as representative of the 7th District until 1931. After the Second World War, Ledesma was appointed acting governor of Iloilo in 1946.
