= Jose Altavas =

Filipino politician and legislator

The Honorable Jose Altavas
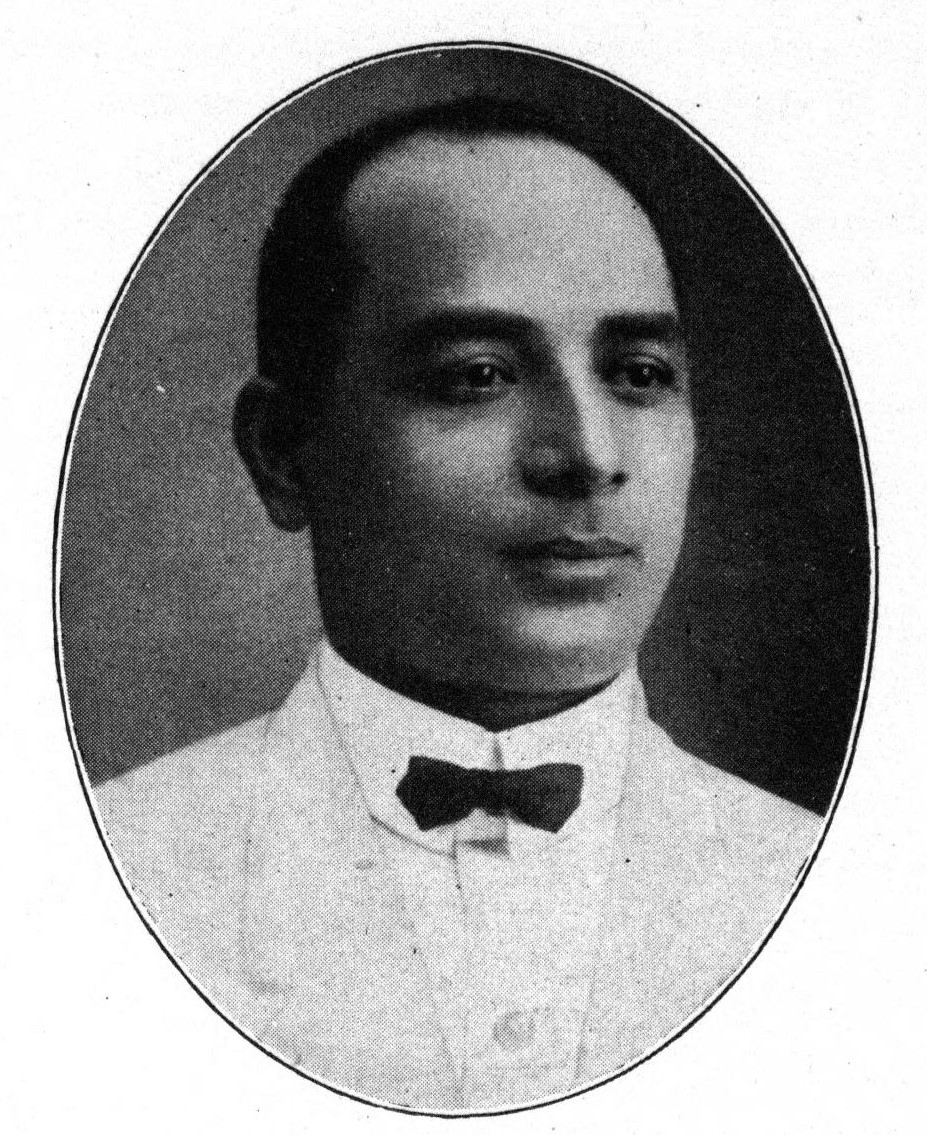
- Official portrait, c. 1917

Senator of the Philippines from the 7th district
- In office October 16, 1916 – June 6, 1922 Serving with Francisco Felipe Villanueva; José María Arroyo
- Preceded by: Position established
- Succeeded by: Jose Hontiveros

Delegate of the 1934 Constitutional Convention from Capiz
- In office 1934–1935

Member of the Philippine Assembly from Capiz's 2nd district
- In office October 16, 1907 – October 16, 1909
- Preceded by: Position established
- Succeeded by: Leocadio Pajarillo

Member of the Philippine House of Representatives from Capiz's 2nd district
- In office June 2, 1925 – June 5, 1928
- Preceded by: Agustín Aldea
- Succeeded by: José A. Dorado

4th Governor of Capiz
- In office 1910–1916
- Preceded by: Antonio Habana
- Succeeded by: Jose Hontiveros

Member of the Capiz Provincial Board
- In office 1906–1907

Personal details
- Born: Jose Altavas y Cortes; September 11, 1877 Balete, Capiz, Captaincy General of the Philippines
- Died: August 21, 1952 (aged 74) Roxas City, Capiz, Philippines
- Party: Nacionalista (1916–1952)
- Other political affiliations: Independent (1907–1916)
- Spouse: Socorro Barrios Laserna
- Children: 7
- Education: Ateneo de Manila; University of Santo Tomas
- Profession: Lawyer

Jose Cortes Altavas (September 11, 1877 – August 21, 1952) was a Filipino politician, legislator and man of letters. He was a municipal councilman of Capiz (present day Roxas City, Capiz), provincial board member (1906–1907), representative (1907–1909 and 1925–1928), governor of Capiz (1910–1916), senator (1916 to 1922), and 1934 Constitutional Convention delegate.

== Early life and education ==
Born on September 11, 1877, Jose Altavas was from the town of Balete, which was then part of the province of Capiz, Philippines. His parents, Jose Altavas Sr. and Andrea Cortes, sent him to Ateneo de Manila for school and later at the University of Santo Tomas for his law degree. His studies were disrupted by the Philippine Revolution of which he had an active involvement in his hometown under the command of Santiago Bellosillo. He was 20 years old at that time.

When the revolution ended, he finished his studies and practiced law in Capiz on May 6, 1901, after passing the bar. He was also a newspaperman and writer who wrote Spanish poems and a 54-volume memoir that contained recollections of his life.

== Political career ==
Altavas began his political career as an elected member of the Capiz (present day Roxas City) municipal council in 1903 and later as provincial board member from 1906 until 1907. From 1907 to 1909, he was voted as a legislator to the First Philippine Legislature for the 2nd district of the province. In 1910, he became governor of Capiz and served until 1916. It was during his term that the construction of the provincial capitol building, bridges, and roads between Aklan and Capiz began.

From 1916 to 1922, Altavas was elected senator during the Fourth Philippine Legislature and the Fifth Philippine Legislature, representing the 7th senatorial district that was composed of the provinces of Capiz, Iloilo and Romblon. By 1925, he again won as 2nd district representative, and his term ended in 1927. He was also voted to be the 1st district delegate to the 1934 Constitutional Assembly.

== Personal life ==
Altavas was married to Socorro Barrios Laserna and had seven children. On August 21, 1952, he died in Roxas City, Capiz.

A historical marker was installed by the National Historical Commission of the Philippines in his memory at the entrance of the Altavas municipal hall, and his bust can be found at the park outside the building.

== Gallery ==
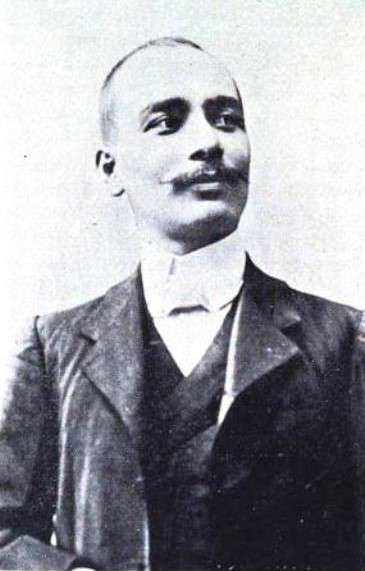
Altavas as a member of the Philippine Assembly, 1908

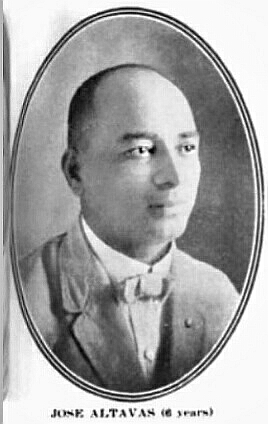
Altavas from the Philippine Education, published April 1917

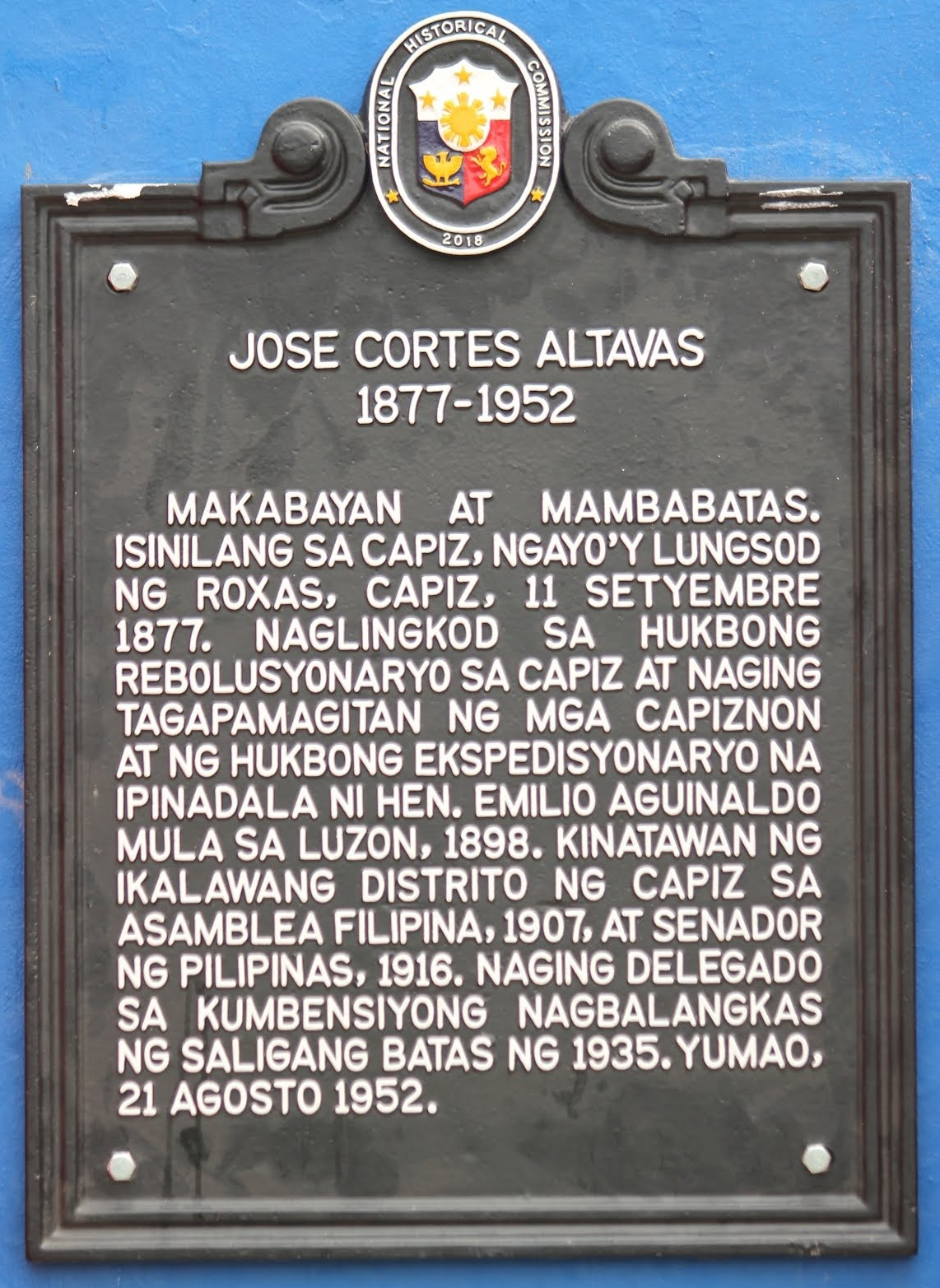
Historical marker installed in 2018 at the town plaza of Altavas
