= Eduardo Hontiveros =

Filipino priest & musician (1923–2008)

The Reverend Father Eduardo Hontiveros SJ PMM
- Born: Eduardo Jose Pardo Hontiveros; December 20, 1923; Molo, Iloilo City, Philippine Islands
- Died: January 15, 2008 (aged 84); Quezon City, Philippines
- Parent(s): Jose Hontiveros; Vicenta Ruiz Pardo
- Relatives: Daisy Avellana (sister); Lamberto V. Avellana (brother-in-law); Nita Hontiveros-Lichauco (sister); Risa Hontiveros (niece); Pia Hontiveros (niece); Jose Mari Avellana (nephew)
- Church: Catholic Church
- Ordained: March 24, 1954
- Musical career
- Also known as: Father Honti
- Genres: Liturgical music
- Occupations: Composer, musician, choirmaster
- Instruments: Piano, accordion
- Years active: 1960–1972, 1986–1999
- Label: Jesuit Music Ministry (JMM)

Eduardo Jose Pardo Hontiveros (December 20, 1923 – January 15, 2008) was a Filipino Jesuit priest, musician, and composer. Best known as an innovative hymn writer, he is widely recognized as the “Father of Philippine Liturgical Music."

== Biography ==
He was born in Molo, Iloilo City, one of eight siblings, to José Hontiveros and Vicenta Pardo. He studied at Capiz Elementary School and transferred to Ateneo de Manila High School, graduating in 1939. He attended San Jose Seminary from 1939 to 1945 and joined the Society of Jesus in 1945; he professed his simple vows in 1947. He began theology studies in the United States in 1951 and was ordained a priest by Cardinal Francis Spellman in 1954.

Following the Second Vatican Council's authorization of the vernacular in the liturgy, Hontiveros began to write liturgical hymns in the 1960s. He wrote his first hymn for Mass at the Jesuit-administered San Jose Manggagawa parish in Barangka, Marikina, intending that it could be easily sung and learned by ordinary Filipinos. This established the tradition of Filipino popular hymnody that was later labeled as "Jesuit music."

His most famous hymns include Tagalog settings of the Gloria ("Papuri sa Diyos") and Magnificat ("Ang Puso Ko'y Nagpupuri"), as well as "Maria, Bukang-Liwayway" (lit. 'Mary, Dawn') and "Pananagutan" (lit. 'Responsibility'), among others. His works have been published and sung in many parishes in the Philippines and abroad; his Gloria has been sung at St. Peter's Basilica in Rome. His works were published by the Ateneo-based Jesuit Music Ministry.

=== Illness and death ===
Hontiveros suffered a stroke in 1991 which affected his mobility and ability to communicate. On January 4, 2008, he was found lying unconscious in a hallway of the Loyola House of Studies in Quezon City, and physicians later determined that he had suffered another stroke. He died on January 15, 2008. Among the attendees at his funeral on January 19 was President Gloria Macapagal Arroyo, who presented a posthumous award for his work.

== Legacy ==
In 2024, the Jesuit Communications Foundation, as a tribute to Hontiveros’ 100th birth anniversary, organized a three-hour concert titled “Luwalhati sa Diyos: The Legacy of Father Honti” at the Ateneo de Manila University’s Henry Lee Irwin Theater. It featured Bukas Palad Music Ministry, Himig Heswita, Pansol Choir, Tinig Barangka, and the Young Voices of the Philippines.

== Awards ==
- 1976 - Tanglaw ng Lahi Awards (Ateneo de Manila University)
- 1992 - Asian Catholic Publisher's Outstanding Catholic Author Award
- 2000 - Pro Ecclesia et Pontifice
- 2008 - Presidential Medal of Merit (posthumous)

== See also ==
- Jesuit Music Ministry - Hontiveros' publisher
- Bukas Palad Music Ministry
- Hangad
