= Naty Crame-Rogers =

Filipina actress (1922–2021)

- Born: Natividad Kabeza Crame; December 23, 1922 (age 103)
- Died: February 1, 2021 (aged 98)
- Occupations: Actress; flight attendant; drama teacher; writer; film producer; researcher

Natividad "Naty" Crame-Rogers (23 December 1922 – 1 February 2021) was a Filipina actress, drama teacher, writer, producer and researcher. She was best known for originating the role of Paula in the 1965 film adaptation of the play A Portrait of the Artist as Filipino.

Crame-Rogers was born in Cavite and studied at St. Scholastica's College and University of the Philippines. She later went to the United States, where she completed a Teaching English as a Second Language Program at the University of California, Los Angeles.

A patron of the arts, she formed the Philippine Drama Company and the Amingtahanan Sala Theater. She died on 1 February 2021, at age 98.

== Early life and education ==
Crame-Rogers was born in Cavite as the eldest of five daughters. Her father was Don Ramon Crame, a jazz player who played for the Tirso Cruz Band and was known as the “Douglas Fairbanks, Sr. of the Philippines”. From him, she became interested in the arts. Her mother, Espectation Kabeza, was a schoolteacher. She first studied at St. Scholastica's College. Before graduating from elementary, she had directed her first play, Cinderella in Flowerland. She also completed her high school education at St. Scholastica's.

Beginning in 1939 at 17 years old and during World War II, she studied at the University of the Philippines, graduating with a bachelor's degree in philosophy and letters. She then got a Fulbright scholarship, completed the English as a Second Language Program at UCLA, and earned a masterals degree in Speech and Drama Education from Stanford. She completed her education with a doctorate from the University of Santo Tomas.

== Career ==
In 1946, Crame-Rogers was selected out of 600 candidates to be part of the first batch of international flight attendants for the Philippine Airlines (PAL). She resigned from her job after marrying Lt. Joe Rogers.

After completing her education abroad, Crame-Rogers taught Speech and Drama at the Philippine Normal College, and became its founding chairman of the Drama-Speech and Theater Department. She eventually became active in local theater. Her first theater role was in the play Wanted: A Chaperone. Beginning in 1950, she assisted Dr. Severino Montano in founding the first community theater. She also worked alongside Rolando Tinio on several plays. She then took a five-year hiatus from work as she and her husband moved to Bangkok, Thailand, where he served as the country's representative to the Southeast Asian Treaty Organization. During this time, she attended international seminars and workshops in Honolulu, London, and Connecticut.

In 1965, Crame-Rogers took on her only film role in the film adaptation of the play A Portrait of the Artist as Filipino as Paula Marasigan, the younger sister of Candida played by Daisy Avellana. Avellana won the FAMAS Award for Best Actress while Crame-Rogers was nominated for Best Supporting Actress.

In 1983, she was the founder of the Amingtahanan Sala Theater, an alternative theater group. They did impromptu plays with other theater artists staged at her home. A year later, she founded the Philippine Drama Company. She retired from full-time teaching that year. She played Candida at age 90 in 2012 in the Philippine Drama Company's Sala Theater staging of A Portrait of the Artist as Filipino, which she also directed, as part of the company's 27th season. She also participated in the stage play Mind's Eye that year.

== Awards and achievements ==
Among her awards and achievements include:

- 1994, Cultural Center of the Philippines Gawad Award in Theater
- 1999, 100 Outstanding Filipinos in the 20th Century in the field of Theater
- 1999, PAX awardee
- 2005, The National Commission of Culture and the Arts (NCCA) Centennial Award for Women given by Pres. Gloria Arroyo
- 2008, UP Centennial Lifetime Achievement Award
- 2009, The Lifetime Achievement ALIW Award
- 2011, The Living Legend Philippine Theater Award of the International University Theater Association
- 2013, Natatanging Gawad Buhay OR Philstage's Lifetime Achievement Award

She has also been nominated twice to be recognized as a National Artist, but as of 2025, has yet to be recognized as one.

== Personal life ==
Crame married Lieutenant Jose "Joe" Rogers, a half-American pilot who survived the Bataan Death March. They met while she was working as a flight attendant and he was on loan from the Philippine Air Force to PAL. After retiring, Rogers also became active in theater activities. He died in August 2002. They had an adopted son, Ralph. Her granddaughter in-law was Sweet Plantado, one of the singers of the vocal group The CompanY.

Crame-Rogers was the granddaughter of Brigadier General Rafael Crame, the first chief of the Philippine Constabulary after whom Camp Crame was named.

Crame-Rogers was a devout Roman Catholic, due to her time at St. Scholastica's.

In November 2016, her biography, Naty Crame Rogers: A Life in Theater was published.

== Later life and death ==
She lived out the rest of her days at Kapitolyo, Pasig. She died on February 1, 2021, at a Pasig City hospital due to complications of old age at the age of 98. Her remains were buried on February 5 at the Manila Memorial Park.

== Stage credits ==
Year	Title	Role	Ref.
	Wanted: A Chaperone		
	A Portrait of the Artist as Filipino	Paula Marasigan	
	Romeo and Juliet	Nurse	

== Filmography ==
Year	Title	Role	Ref.
1965	A Portrait of the Artist as Filipino	Paula Marasigan	

== Bibliography ==
In the 2000s, Crame-Rogers' research Classical Forms of Theater in Asia was published by the UST Publishing House after over 40 years of research.

- Classical Forms of Theater in Asia. UST Publishing House. 2005.
