= Gilopez Kabayao =

Filipino violinist (1929–2024)

- Born: December 23, 1929; Cadiz, Negros Occidental, Philippine Islands
- Origin: Cadiz / Iloilo City
- Died: October 12, 2024 (aged 94)
- Genres: Classical
- Instrument: Violin
- Years active: c. 1950–2023
- Formerly of: Kabayao Quintet; Manila Symphony Orchestra
- Spouse: Corazon Pineda (m. 1974)

Gilopez Kabayao (December 23, 1929 – October 12, 2024) was a Filipino violinist. Kabayao was the first Filipino to perform at the Carnegie Hall in New York City in 1950.

== Early life and education ==
Gilopez Kabayao was born at the Hacienda Faraon in Cadiz, Negros Occidental on December 23, 1929. Kabayao was part of a family of musicians associated with Bacolod and was named after his maternal grandfather, composer Gil Lopez. His father was violinist Dr. Doroteo Kabayao and his mother was pianist Marcela Lopez, whose family were involved in the sugar industry of Iloilo. Kabayao studied at Silliman University, New York College of Music, and Vienna under the mentorship of Theodore Pashkus.

== Career ==
Kabayao sometime in 1950 performed at the Carnegie Hall in New York City, becoming the first Filipino to perform at the venue. He was noted for performing solo the Adagio and Fugue from Johann Sebastian Bach's C major solo violin sonata.

Dubbed as the "Father of Outreach for Classical Music", "Mozart to the Barrios", and the "Traveling Salesman of Music", Kabayao is known to conduct performances in various places in the Philippines. This includes remote and unconventional places such as schools, marketplaces, cockpits, basketball courts, hospitals, and mountain villages.

He made transcripts for violin for 24 Philippine folk songs and kundiman.

In addition to his musical outreach, he also became a musical director and conductor for the Manila Symphony Orchestra in the 1970s. He was also performed for the Shostakovich Violin Concerto in the Philippines and China as well as with the New Zealand National Orchestra in New Zealand.

Kabayao and his wife Corazon Pineda Kabayao with their three children, Sicilienne, Farida, and Gilberto, would perform in the Philippines and overseas as the Kabayao Quintet.

The Kabayaos had their last public performance at the Diversion 21 Hotel in Iloilo City in July 2023.

== Awards and recognition ==
Kabayao received the Presidential Award of Merit in 1969 and the Ramon Magsaysay Award in 1972, and with his wife, the couple received the Gawad Alab ng Haraya from the National Commission for Culture and the Arts in 2007 and the Gawad CCP Para sa Sining from the Cultural Center of the Philippines in 2008. He was also nominated for National Artist of the Philippines in June 2024 by the Iloilo Dinagyang Foundation with the endorsement of the government of Iloilo City. The Cadiz local government named Kabayao among the city's 10 outstanding residents during its 57th Charter Day celebrations in July 2024.

== Personal life ==
Kabayao married Corazon Pineda of Iloilo City around 1974. They had three children. While from Negros Occidental, Kabayao settled in Iloilo City. Gilopez himself traces his family's roots to Molo.

== Death ==
Kabayao died in Iloilo City at the age of 94 of an undisclosed illness on October 12, 2024. His remains were interred at the Iloilo Memorial Park on October 19.
