= A Portrait of the Artist as Filipino =

Play by Nick Joaquin (1950)

The A Portrait of the Artist as Filipino, known also as "A Portrait of the Artist as Filipino: An Elegy in Three Scenes" is a literary play written in English by Filipino National Artist for Literature Nick Joaquin in 1950. It was described as Joaquin's "most popular play," as the "most important Filipino play in English," and as "probably the best-known Filipino play." Apart from being regarded also as the “national play of the Philippines” because of its popularity, it also became one of the important reads in English classes in the Philippines. Joaquin's play was described by Anita Gates, a reviewer from The New York Times, as an "engaging, well plotted metaphor for the passing of Old Manila."

== Plot summary and thematic description ==
Set in the Filipino world of pre-World War II Intramuros of Old Manila in October 1941, the play explores the many aspects of Philippine high society by telling the story of the Marasigan sisters, Candida and Paula, and their father, the painter Don Lorenzo Marasigan. Due to an artistic drought on Don Lorenzo's part, the family has to make ends meet by relying on the financial support provided by their brother Manolo and sister Pepang, who were urging them to sell the house. Later on, they also had to take a male boarder, in the person of Tony Javier. Don Lorenzo, who refused to sell, donate, or even exhibit his self-portrait in public, was only content in staying inside his room, a stubbornness that already took a period of one year. The painting has attracted the attention and curiosity of journalists such as a family friend named Bitoy Camacho, and other obnoxious visitors pretending as art critics. When one of the daughters, Paula, elopes with Tony, a journey of personal liberation is set in motion, which ends with a restoration of family relations which had been strained due to the neediness of the artist's family. The theme focuses on family conflict and the amalgamation of old Filipino identity and cultural character with the arrival of contemporary and Western ideals.

== Historical setting and background ==
Before the Second World War, many Filipino intellectuals and artists – including painters, as personified by Don Lorenzo Marasigan – searched for cultural enlightenment from Spain, the first imposer of colonialism and authority in the Philippines. This group of Filipinos was acquainted with the Spanish language and customs. After the split of Philippines from Spain, the United States became the replacement model for cultural enhancement, where English language and materialism became a part – as personified by the boarder Tony Javier – thus marginalizing native tongues and culture within the process. During this period, the Philippines was also plagued by the looming war, frequent blackouts, and untrustworthy characters of the existing nightlife in Old Manila.

== Productions and adaptations ==
=== Theatrical presentations ===
After Joaquin wrote A Portrait of the Artist as Filipino in 1950, it was first published in Weekly Women's Magazine and Prose and Poems in 1952 and then aired on radio before being formally presented on stage in 1955. It premiered at the Aurora Gardens of Intramuros, Manila, through the performance of the group known as the Barangay Theater Guild (BGT).

BGT shortened the script and featured Daisy Hontiveros-Avellana as Candida and Dolly Benavides as Paula, who was later on replaced by Naty Crame-Rogers. The production was directed by Lamberto Avellana.

There have been Tagalog translations. In 1969, Krip Yuson and Franklin Osorio wrote a translation that was staged by Philippine Educational Theater Association and later on by the UP Repertory Company.

In 1989, Bienvenido Lumbera wrote a translation titled "Larawan" that was staged by Tanghalang Pilipino. It was restaged in 1992 (featuring Celeste Legaspi and Noemi Manikan-Gomez) and 2000. Tanghalang Pilipino also staged a Spanish translation by Lourdes Brillantes in 2000.

In 1993, Dulaang UP staged the English and Bievenido Lumbera Tagalog translation.

In 1997, Musical Theater Philippines (Musicat) staged a Tagalog musical adaptation titled “Larawan” at Tanghalang Nicanor Abelardo, Cultural Center of the Philippines. Translation and lyrics by Rolando Tinio, music by Ryan Cayabyab, featuring Celeste Legaspi as Candida and Zsa Zsa Padilla as Paula (Rachel Alejandro took over in the second run). Cast included Roeder Camañag as Bitoy and Ricky Davao as Tony Javier. The chorus consisted of opera singers Fides Cuyugan-Asencio, Armida Siguion-Reyna, Nomer Son, Robert Natividad and Gamaliel Viray.

In 1997, Ma-Yi Theater Company staged the English version at Vineyard Dimson Theatre in New York City from July 26 to August 16, 1997, directed by Jorge W. Ledesma.

From 1998 until 2005, the University of Santo Tomas Graduate School Academic Theater, led by then Dean of the UST Graduate School, Rev. Fr. Antonio Aureada OP, staged the play as a tribute to both Nick Joaquin and the Barangay Theater Guild in various provinces and twice abroad—in South Korea in 2002 and in the US in 2004.

In 2002, World Theater Project at Sambalikhaan staged a production that transformed the two sisters into two gay brothers, Candido played by Anton Juan and Pablito played by Behn Cervantes, directed by Anton Juan. Floy Quintos and Chelu Marques alternated as Bitoy Camacho, Raymond Bagatsing and Marco Sison alternated as Tony Javier. The Cultural Center of the Philippines "allotted P1.3 million" to the production.

In 2009, Repertory Philippines staged the English play (using the script of BGT) at OnStage Theater, Greenbelt 1 Mall, Makati, directed by Lamberto Avellana and Daisy Hontiveros-Avellana's son Jose Mari Avellana. He dedicated the production to his mother. The cast featured Ana Abad-Santos and Irma Adlawan-Marasigan alternating as Candida, Leisl Batucan as Paula, Joel Trinidad as Bitoy Camacho and Randy Villarama as Tony Javier.

=== Literary readings ===
On October 5, 2004, readings of Joaquin's plays, essays, and poems, entitled Portrait of the Artist as Nick Joaquin: Celebrating the Life and Works of a Beloved National Artist, which has a similarity to the title of Joaquin's play, was presented in New York City by the Philippine Economic and Cultural Endowment (PEACE), the Ma-Yi Theater Company, and the Philippine Consulate General in New York, under the direction of Andrew Eisenman. This literary event and cultural presentation is considered as the first official tribute offered to Nick Joaquin ever held in New York City.

=== Film adaptation ===
Theatrical release poster

In 1965, it was adapted into a black-and-white English-language film with the same title by Filipino director, Lamberto V. Avellana The film was produced by Manny de Leon under his production company Diadem. Cinematography was by Mike Accion, music was by Miguel Velarde. Cast included Daisy Hontiveros-Avellana as Candida, Naty Crame-Rogers as Paula, Vic Silayan as Bitoy Camacho, Conrad Parham as Tony Javier

Crame-Rogers said in an interview that "There were a lot of disputes in 1965 because Nick was not keen on turning his play into a movie, but we found the right setting [an old house in Biñan]."

The film version received six Filipino Academy of Movie Arts and Sciences Award nominations, including a FAMAS Best Picture nomination.

In 2014, the Film Development Council of the Philippines (FDCP) cofinanced the restoration of the 1965 film with Mike De Leon, son of Manny de Leon, based on the original 35mm negative found in the LVN archive by his father, and sound from film prints found in Germany. L'Immagine Ritrovata was commissioned to do the restoration. The restored version of the film was shown at the CCP in 2015 with Naty Crame-Rogers, the only living cast member at the time, in attendance.

In 2015, Butch Nolasco produced and directed "PORTRAIT: Rediscovering a Filipino Film Classic," a documentary based on the recollections of Lamberto Avellana's daughter Ivi Avellana-Cosio on the making of the movie. The documentary won first runner-up honors at the 19th Gawad CCP Documentary Film Festival.

In 2023, the film received a home media release in France as part of a Blu-ray box set from Carlotta Films collecting the films directed by Mike de Leon.

== See also ==
- An Embarrassment of Riches
