= Pia Hontiveros =

Filipino journalist

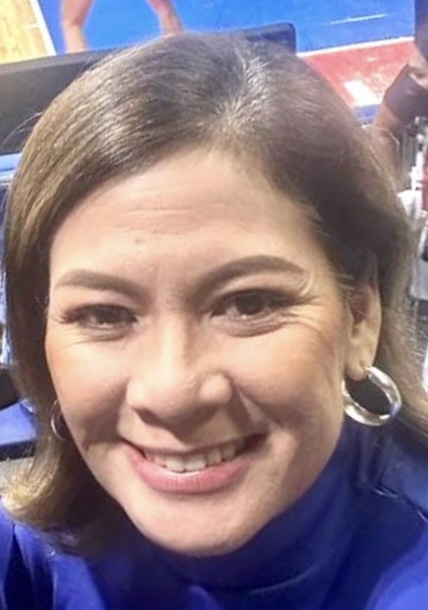
- Hontiveros in 2023
- Born: Ana Patricia Navarro Hontiveros
- Education: Ateneo de Manila University (BA)
- Occupations: Broadcast journalist; talk show host
- Spouse: R'win Pagkalinawan
- Children: 3
- Relatives: Risa Hontiveros (sister); Jose Hontiveros (grandfather); Nita Hontiveros-Lichauco (aunt); Eduardo Hontiveros (uncle); Daisy Avellana (aunt); Leah Navarro (cousin); Barbie Almalbis (niece)

Ana Patricia "Pia" Navarro Hontiveros-Pagkalinawan (Tagalog: [ˈpija ɔntɪˈverɔs]) is a Filipina broadcast journalist. She is known for hosting politics-oriented shows on ABS-CBN, ANC, and CNN Philippines. Hontiveros was the chief correspondent of CNN Philippines until its closure in 2024.

== Early life ==
Pia Hontiveros was born as Ana Patricia Navarro Hontiveros to a Panay Visayan lawyer and a Caviteño-Mindoreño Tagalog executive secretary. Raised in Merville, Parañaque, she grew up in a household that encouraged outspoken yet respectful dialogue.

Hontiveros belongs to prominent Filipino families. Her paternal lineage includes Jose Hontiveros, a former senator and associate justice of the Supreme Court of the Philippines, while her aunts and uncles include National Artists Daisy Hontiveros Avellana and Lamberto V. Avellana, Jesuit priest and liturgical music pioneer Eduardo Hontiveros, and Philippine Animal Welfare Society (PAWS) founder Nita Hontiveros-Lichauco. Her siblings include Senator Risa Hontiveros and sustainability executive Ginggay Hontiveros-Malvar, while her extended family includes notable figures such as singer Leah Navarro, Cebu City Vice Mayor Dondon Hontiveros, and musician Barbie Almalbis.

Hontiveros graduated in 1989 with a Bachelor of Arts degree in interdisciplinary studies from the Ateneo de Manila University.

== Career ==
Hontiveros was the chief correspondent of CNN Philippines, the anchor of the network's flagship newscast News Night and the host of weekly political talk show Politics as Usual. She was the host of the political talk show News.PH from 2012 to 2017, and anchor of the global newscast Global Newsroom from 2016 to2017.

She was a correspondent for the ABS-CBN News Channel (ANC) from 1996 to 2011 and as a reporter from 1989 to 1996. She served as a political correspondent and as an anchor and host of the television shows Top Story, Shop Talk and Strictly Politics on ANC.

== Personal life ==
Hontiveros is married to Philippine National Police Cordillera chief R'Win Pagkalinawan. They have at least three children.

== Filmography ==
Year	Title	Position
1989–1996	TV Patrol	Reporter/Substitute anchor for Mel Tiangco
1995–2004	The Weekend News	News anchor
2000–2011	Strictly Politics	Host
2006–2010	Shop Talk	Host
2010–2012	Top Story	News anchor
2012–2017	CNN Philippines Network News	News anchor
2012–2022	News.PH	News anchor
2016–2019	On The Record	Host
2016–2017	Global Newsroom	News anchor
2017–2024	CNN Philippines News Night	News anchor
2019–2024	Politics as Usual	Host
2020–2021	Front & Center	Host
