= Allan Cosio =

Filipino painter (1941–2021)

- Born: June 20, 1941; Manila, Philippines
- Died: April 29, 2021 (aged 79); Pampanga, Philippines

Allan Cosio (June 20, 1941 – April 29, 2021) was a Filipino painter, sculptor, and production designer.

== Career ==
Cosio, who was self-taught, was first noticed in the Philippine art scene during the 1970s. He started in theater as a thespian prior to becoming a set designer. He was a member of the Saturday Group of Artists.

From the 1970s to the 1980s, Cosio was the president of the Arts Association of the Philippines. His painting earned him a sponsorship from the British Council and the Pollock-Krasner Foundation.

Cosio has had his works exhibited in the United States and numerous other countries in Europe and Asia. One of his known works is the Art for Peace trilogy, which won an international competition in Baghdad, Iraq.

Cosio is also a recipient of the City of Manila Award for Painting and Sculpture and the French government-bestowed Ordre des Arts et des Lettres with a grade of Chevalier.

== Personal life ==
Cosio was married to Ivi Avellana, a former theatre actress, and they had two daughters.

== Death ==
Cosio died on April 29, 2021, in his home province of Pampanga due to complications from COVID-19.
