= Ruperto Montinola =

Filipino lawyer and politician (1869-1940)

The Honorable Ruperto Montinola
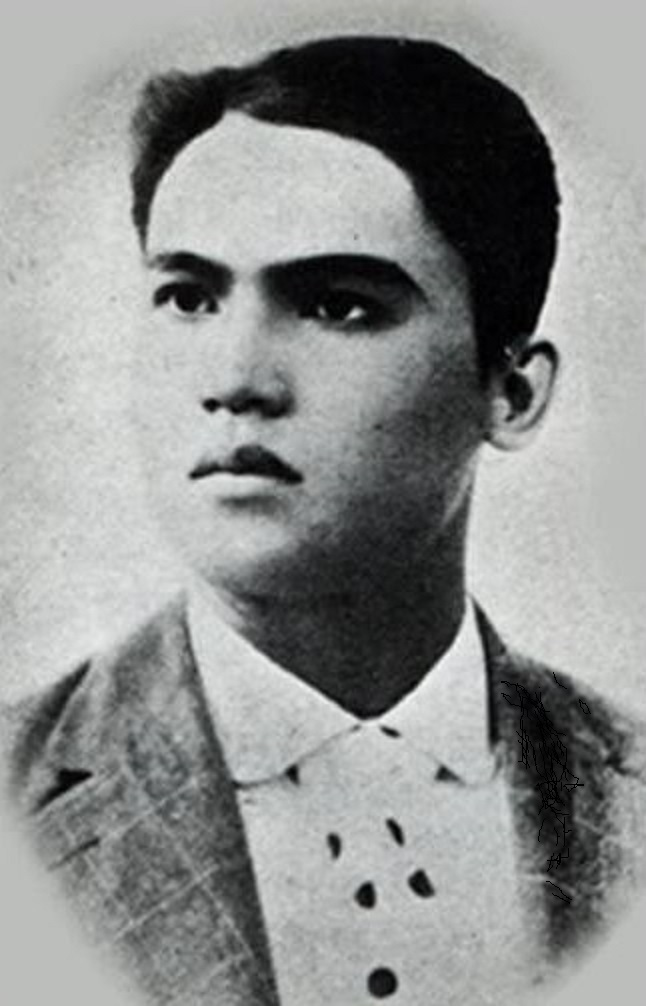

Senator of the Philippines from the 7th District
- In office 2 June 1931 – 16 September 1935 Serving with Antonio Belo; Potenciano Treñas
- Preceded by: Jose Ledesma
- Succeeded by: position abolished

Member of the National Assembly from Iloilo's 2nd district
- In office 16 September 1935 – 10 February 1940
- Preceded by: Vicente Ybiernas
- Succeeded by: Oscar Ledesma

4th and 8th Governor of Iloilo
- In office 1922–1925
- Preceded by: Gregorio Yulo
- Succeeded by: Jose Ledesma
- In office 1908–1912
- Preceded by: Benito Lopez
- Succeeded by: Adriano Hernández y Dayot

Personal details
- Born: Ruperto Benedicto Montinola; March 18, 1869 Bago, Negros Occidental, Captaincy General of the Philippines
- Died: February 10, 1940 (aged 70) Iloilo City, Philippine Commonwealth
- Party: Democrata (1916-1934); Nacionalista (1934-1940)

Ruperto Benedicto Montinola (March 18, 1869 – February 10, 1940) was a Filipino lawyer and politician. He was referred to as "Colossus of the South" in the Philippine press.

== Early life ==
Ruperto Montinola was born on March 18, 1869, in Bago, Negros Occidental to Juan Montinola and Martina Benedicto. He received his Bachelor of Laws degree from the University of Santo Tomas in 1894. In 1897, he joined the Philippine Revolution against Spain. In 1900, Montinola was appointed the first public prosecutor (fiscal) of Iloilo, but resigned in 1903 due to health problems and went to Japan to recuperate. He returned to the Philippines in 1905.

== Political career ==
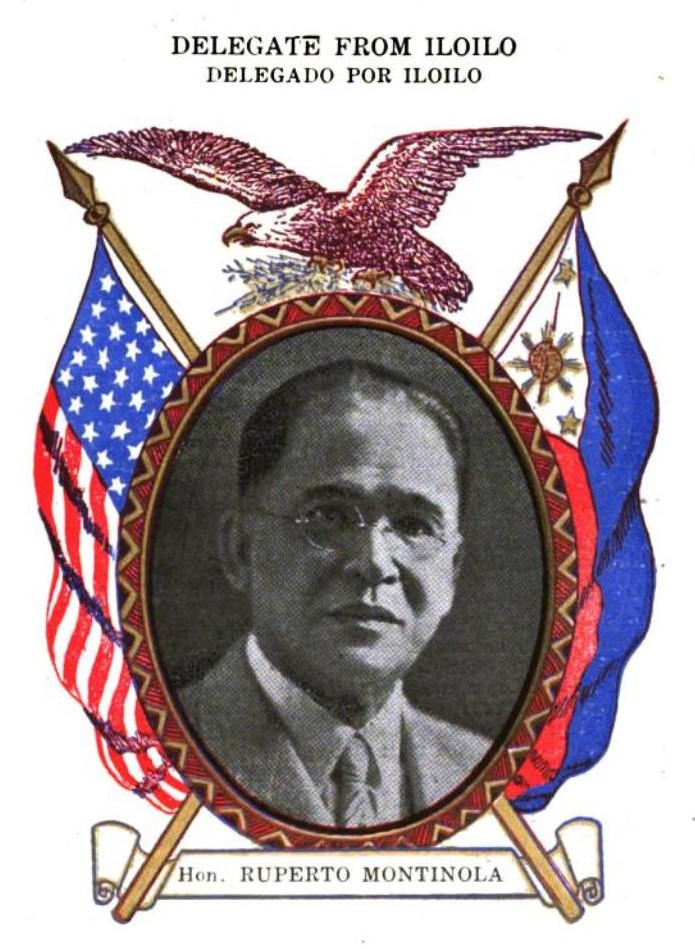
Photograph published by Benipayo Press, c. 1935

In 1908 he was appointed governor of Iloilo after his predecessor Benito Lopez was assassinated. Shortly afterwards he was re-elected in his own right and served until 1912. He later served as governor again from 1922 to 1925. In between, he was also active as a lawyer for various sugar plants and banks in the province. Montinola was a member of the Democrata Party from its founding in 1916. Montinola became one of the leaders of this opposition party until he joined the Nacionalista Party in the early 1930s.

In 1931, Montinola was elected to the Philippine Senate on behalf of the 7th District. He was a member of the OsRox Mission to Washington DC in 1931 that led to the passage of the Hare–Hawes–Cutting Act, the first law to grant Philippine independence, in the US Congress. In 1934, he was one of the delegates to the Constitutional Convention where the 1935 Philippine Constitution was drafted. He was also elected vice president of the convention. In 1935, Montinola was elected to the National Assembly from Iloilo's 2nd district. In 1938 he was re-elected.

== Death ==
Montinola died while in office in 1940 at the age of 70. He was buried in Jaro cemetery.

== Personal life ==
He was married to Basa Benedicto and had six children with her: Aurelio, Remedios, Otilla, Maria, Vicente and Gloria.
