= An Embarrassment of Riches =

Novel by Charlson Ong

- Author: Charlson Ong
- Language: English
- Genre: Novel
- Publisher: Philippine Centennial Commission, the University of the Philippines Press, and the UP Creative Writing Center
- Publication date: 2000
- Publication place: Philippines
- Media type: Print
- Pages: 425
- ISBN: 971-542-202-0
- OCLC: 45463617
- LC Class: MLCM 2000/00356 (P)

An Embarrassment of Riches is a 2000 novel written by Filipino novelist Charlson L. Ong. A Second Place Philippine Centennial Literary Prize winner, the novel was published in Quezon City, Philippines by the Philippine Centennial Commission, the University of the Philippines Press, and the UP Creative Writing Center, in celebration of the one hundred years of Philippine independence from Spain after the Philippine Revolution in 1898. The 425-page novel was written in Philippine English. It is Charlson Ong's first novel.

== Description ==
The scenes in An Embarrassment of Riches is set during the mid-1990s, and occurs in a fictional island west of the Philippines, known as the Victorianas. Victorianas is a "shadow of the Philippines" because it is a developing nation that has similarities to the Philippines. Although filled with characters, circumstances, and places that are familiar to Filipino readers, the Victorianas and the novel deviated from the real and contemporary life in the Philippines, and from the actual events in Philippine history. According to literary critic Vicente G. Groyon III, Ong's fictionalization of recent Philippine history and recasting of the Philippines threads along the borders of surrealism, providing the reader a sense of alienation, foreignness, or being not in the Philippines, despite the similarity of the fictional Victorianas to the archipelago. Among the differences between Victorianas and the Philippines is that the Victorianas is an Americanized Asian country where there is the absence or, even if present, has reduced influences from Spain and Europe, in terms of the Catholic religion, folk beliefs, and traditional practices. Victorianas is composed of mestizo or "hybrid" residents – including the descendants of Chinese, Japanese, Indian, and Malay ancestors, particularly the Chinese Filipinos. Ong intended An Embarrassment of Riches as a novel that presents a Southeast Asian perspective, rather than a Hispanic or Latin American viewpoint. An Embarrassment of Riches is a political, thriller-filled whodunit, and satirical work of fiction that serves as a parody to the events occurring in the Philippines, through the author's creation and utilization of the imaginary island named Victorianas.

== Characters ==
The main characters in An Embarrassment of Riches include Jeffrey Kennedy Tantivo, Jennifer Suarez (also known as JaySy or Jennifer Sy), General Azurin, Brother Mike Verano, and Alfonso Ong. Jeffrey Kennedy Tantivo is the hero and narrator in An Embarrassment of Riches. Jennifer Suarez Sy, the "daughter of the richest man" in Victorianas, is a female politician who wanted to rule Victorianas by providing everything to her constituents. General Azurin is the dictator and ruler of Victorianas. Brother Mike Verano is a religious preacher with questionable background, the suspected killer of Tantivo's father. Alfonso Ong is another shady character, a wealthy and corrupt resident of Victorianas.

== Plot ==
In 1994, Jeffrey Kennedy Tantivo - a writer - returns from his exile in the Philippines to his homeland the Victorianas because of his father's death. Ong intends to uncover the identities of his father's murderers. In addition to this circumstance, Tantivo was also summoned to return to Victorianas by his old friend Jennifer "JaySy" Suarez Sy. Sy – a middle aged woman belonging to the 20- to 30-year-old generation - wants Tantivo to manage her presidential campaign, timed after the demise of General Azurin, the dictatorial leader of Victorianas. Sy is a politician with Maoist inclinations. Sy won but her political rule was brief. On one hand, Brother Mike Verano (originally named as Damian Echevaria), a charismatic preacher and healer, leads the Victorianas Moral Restoration Army using violence for the cause of morality. Then, Alfonso Ong – a wealthy, shrewd and shady character – builds his alternative city of the future on an island off the coast of Victorianas. The novel ends with Tantivo leaving Victorianas – going back in exile – but with a renewed sense and sagacity after the altercations and travails he experienced in the island nation. During Tantivo's stay in the Victoriana's, he found out that Jennifer Suarez is his half sister, and that his real father is Alfonso Ong. Tantivo left the Victorianas with Jennifer Suarez, leaving their beloved nation in political, socio-economic, and religious turmoil.

== Analysis ==
In An Embarrassment of Riches, Ong employed metafiction to portray the Victorianas, a fictional country. Metafiction uses techniques to draw attention to itself as a work of art, while exposing the "truth" of a story. In the case of Ong, he used metafiction in An Embarrassment of Riches in order to draw attention to the novel as a work of literature and as a work of fiction, while exposing the realities happening in a non-fictional country - in this case the Philippines – represented by the Victorianas, an island monickered as a "little Philippines". According to literary critic R. Kwan Laurel, Ong's An Embarrassment of Riches is the most successful in inventing a fictional Philippines among the three 1989 Philippine Centennial Literary Prize winners (the other winning novels were Alfred Yuson's Voyeurs & Savages and Eric Gamalinda's My Sad Republic). Ong created an alternate country – one smaller than an archipelago, and with a different name – to represent the Philippines and its social, economic, and political situation and atmosphere. Because Ong is of Chinese descent, there was a possibility that the reader of ''An Embarrassment of Riches can be interpreted as an "allegory of the Chinese gaining power – control and supremacy – in the Philippines".

The strength of An Embarrassment of Riches as a novel is that it did not "essentialize", simplify, and "exoticize" the Philippines (even if represented as the "Victorianas", the nation of the "Victorianos") and the Filipino experience. R. Kwan Laurel described the ending of An Embarrassment of Riches being similar to Filipino writer Nick Joaquin's play the Portrait of an Artist as Filipino, because Ong's hero pledges to survive, live, remember, and await for another opportunity, for the sake of all the people in the past.
