= René B. Azurin =

Filipino writer

René B. Azurin is an author, political columnist, former business executive, and Professor of Management. He is most notable as a former member of the Philippines’ Constitutional Consultative Commission (ConCom) of 2005 which had been tasked by Philippine President Gloria Macapagal Arroyo with studying and proposing changes to the 1987 Philippine Constitution. He was elected co-Chairman of that body's Committee on Form of Government but dissented from the ConCom majority's eventual decision to propose the replacement of the Philippines’ American-style presidential system with a British-style parliamentary system. He wrote the dissenting Minority Report and participated actively in the public opposition to the proposed change.

== Career ==
René Azurin has an engineering degree as well as masteral and doctoral degrees in business administration from the University of the Philippines Diliman and the Asian Institute of Management. He has been a work systems consultant, a development and investment banker, the chief executive officer of a medium-sized group of companies, and a management professor. He taught strategy courses in the MBA program at the University of the Philippines College of Business Administration. Now retired, he continues to lecture and write. He also still consults occasionally for entities in both the private and public sectors. He has been a consultant on policy and strategy for important government agencies like the Department of Energy, the Philippine National Oil Company, the Department of National Defense (Philippines), Department of the Interior and Local Government, and Department of Environment and Natural Resources.

Azurin was a member (representing Academe) of the Independent Oil Price Review Committee, a 7-member multi-sector body organized in 2012 by the administration of Philippine President Benigno Aquino III to study the operations of local oil companies and determine whether oil product prices in the Philippines were being fairly set and whether these companies were accumulating excessive profits.

For several years, Azurin was a featured regular columnist for the newspaper Business World, writing on political, economic, technology and social issues.

Since 2009, Azurin has been a vocal public critic of the automated election system that the Philippines’ electoral body – the Commission on Elections (Comelec) – has been using since the country's 2010 presidential elections. His book Hacking Our Democracy: The Conspiracy to Electronically Control Philippine Elections (2013) contains his exposition of the problems with Comelec's chosen automated election system. He is a convener of the citizens’ poll watchdog group AES Watch, a multi-sector coalition made up of civic and religious groups, industry and professional associations, academic organizations, and information technology practitioners and specialists.

Among Azurin's other books are: Power and Privilege: Essays on Politics, Economics, and Government(2010) and Power Without Virtue: A Critical Perspective on Philippine Governance (2008) Azurin’s most recent book is Expanding Strategic Perspective: Revisiting Lessons from History and the Classics (2023) published by the University of the Philippines Press.

Azurin is a member of the Philippine branch of International P.E.N. (Poets, Essayists, Novelists), the oldest literary and human rights organization in the world.

== Personal life ==
René Azurin is the son of the Philippines’ former Minister of Health Dr. Jesus C. Azurin and former City Schools Superintendent of the Department of Education (Philippines) Dr. Edna B. Azurin. He is married to Ma. Carmela Claro, with whom he has a son, Mikah, and a daughter, Sarah. He has a granddaughter, Sophia. He lives in Manila.

== Bibliography ==
Azurin has written numerous articles and eight books.

- Expanding Strategic Perspective: Revisiting Lessons from History and the Classics (2023), University of the Philippines Press, ISBN 9786210900040
- Hacking Our Democracy: The Conspiracy to Electronically Control Philippine Elections ISBN 9719565705
- Power and Privilege: Essays on Politics, Economics, and Government
- Power Without Virtue: A Critical Perspective on Philippine Governance
- Stationary Bandits: Essays on Political Power
- Marginal Notes–Lectures in Business Economics
- Random Walks and Other Essays: Ruminations of a So-so Manager
- Collusion or Efficiency? On the concentration-profitability relationship in selected Philippine industries

He has also contributed chapters and articles to books edited and published by other authors. His most recent contribution is the article "Elections as an instrument of political control" to the book Chasing the Wind: Assessing Philippine Democracy, 2nd edition (2016), edited by Felipe B. Miranda and Temario C. Rivera, and published by the Commission on Human Rights (Philippines) and the United Nations Development Programme.
