= Philippine Animal Welfare Society =

Organization

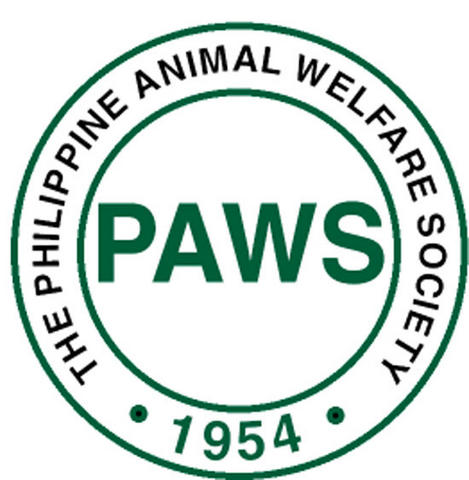

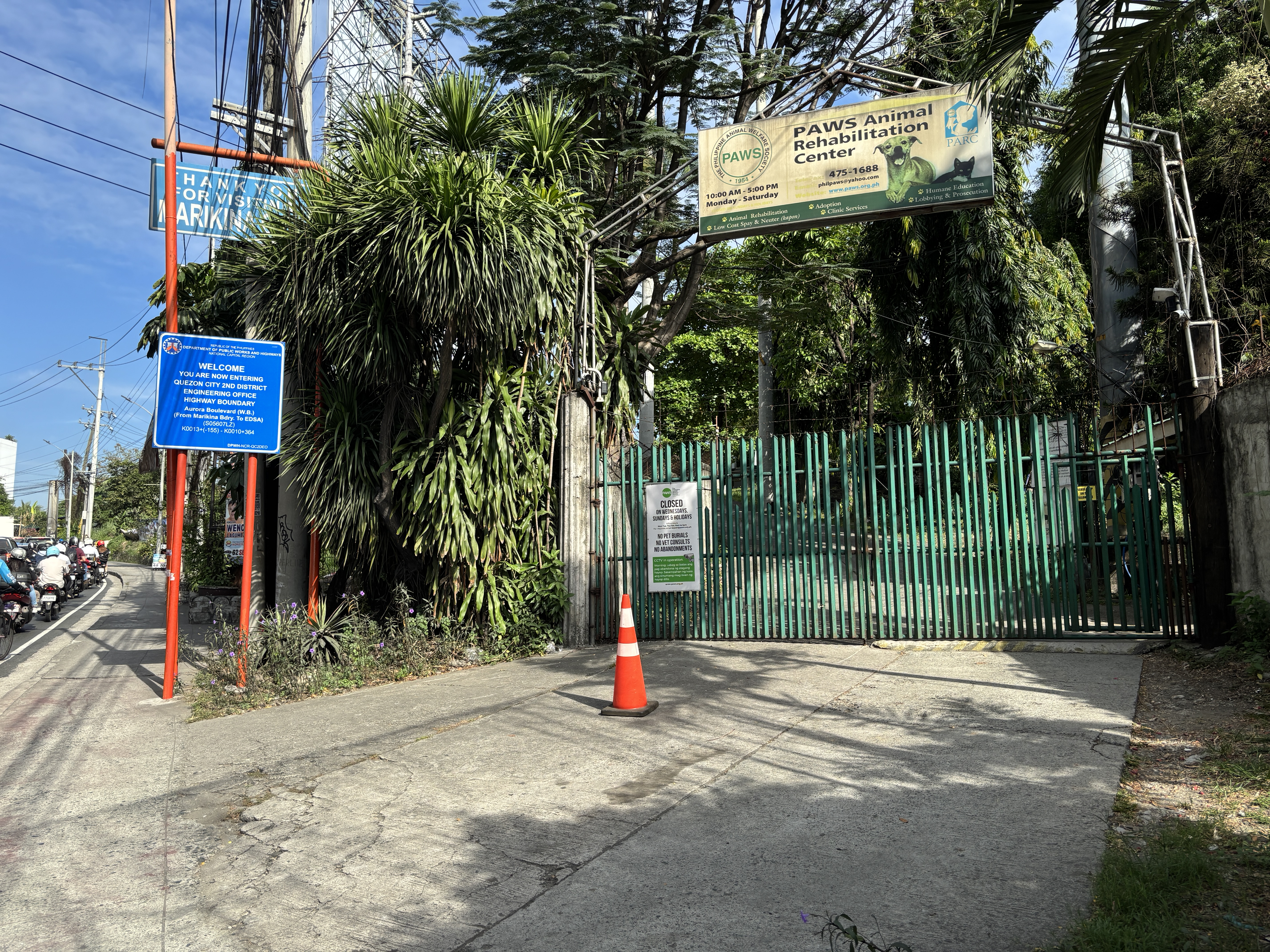
- Rehabilitation center of Philippine Animal Welfare Society in Quezon City
- Formation: 1954; 72 years ago
- Founder: Muriel Jay (1954); Nita Hontiveros-Lichauco (1986)
- Purpose: Animal welfare
- Location: Aurora Blvd corner Katipunan Avenue, Loyola Heights, Quezon City, 1108 Quezon City, Philippines
- Coordinates: 14°38′00″N 121°04′36″E
- Director: Anna Hashim-Cabrera
- Website: https://paws.org.ph

The Philippine Animal Welfare Society (PAWS) is a volunteer-based, non-government organization whose goal is to prevent animal cruelty through education, animal sheltering and advocacy, based in Quezon City, Philippines. It was founded in 1954 by Muriel Jay. PAWS believes that the creation of a more peaceful society starts with the widening of mankind's circle of compassion which includes animals, thereby envisions a nation that respects animals, practices responsible pet ownership and protects wildlife. The volunteer-based organization rehabilitates these animals in the hope of finding them new homes and a second chance at a good life. PAWS does not take in pets of other people, but only victims of cruelty or neglect where the animal offenders are charged with violation of the Animal Welfare Act in court.

== History ==
The Philippine Animal Welfare Society was founded in 1954 by Muriel Jay, a British educator who was then residing in the Philippines. She handpicked the first wave of members. Nita Hontiveros, one of the younger members then, recalls that the group would make stuffed toys and other items which the members would then sell to raise funds. Other activities included a clinic to provide services to injured animals.

When Muriel Jay went back to England, PAWS became less active and eventually slipped into dormancy. In 1986, Nita Hontiveros-Lichauco, the late PAWS President, reorganized PAWS with a handful of volunteers composing of veterinarians, educators and people from other professions. They became the original board of Directors.

== Programs and advocacies ==
PAWS is against the abuse of animals in any form. For years, the organization defended animals and reminded the people of animal rights by organizing different programs. Here are some of the organization's successful and on-going projects and programs:

=== The Animal Welfare Act of the Philippines and The Anti-Rabies Act ===
PAWS has been actively lobbying for better laws concerning animal welfare.

==== RA 8485 – The Animal Welfare Act of the Philippines ====
Since its reorganization in 1986, PAWS has been actively lobbying for the Republic Act 8485 or the Animal Welfare Act of the Philippines. However, the government was still not ready for it by that time. A revised Animal Welfare Bill was drawn up and diligently pursued by the organization in the Senate and in Congress. On February 11, 1998, the Animal Welfare Act of 1998 (also known as Republic Act 8485) was signed into law by then Philippine President Fidel V. Ramos.

==== RA 9482 – The Anti-Rabies Act of 2007 ====
After months of lobbying by DA, BAI, NMIS, vet groups and other animal welfare NGOs, the Anti-Rabies Act of 2007 or the Republic Act 9482 was signed into law by former President Gloria Macapagal-Arroyo on May 25, 2007.

The program involves the mass vaccination of dogs, establishment of a central database system for registered and vaccinated dogs, impounding, field control and disposition of stray and unvaccinated dogs. It also calls for information and education campaign on the prevention and control of rabies, pre-exposure treatment of high-risk personnel and post-exposure treatment of animal bite victims, free routine immunization of schoolchildren aged 5 to 14 in areas where there is high incidence of rabies and encouragement of responsible pet ownership.

=== Aspin and Puspin ===
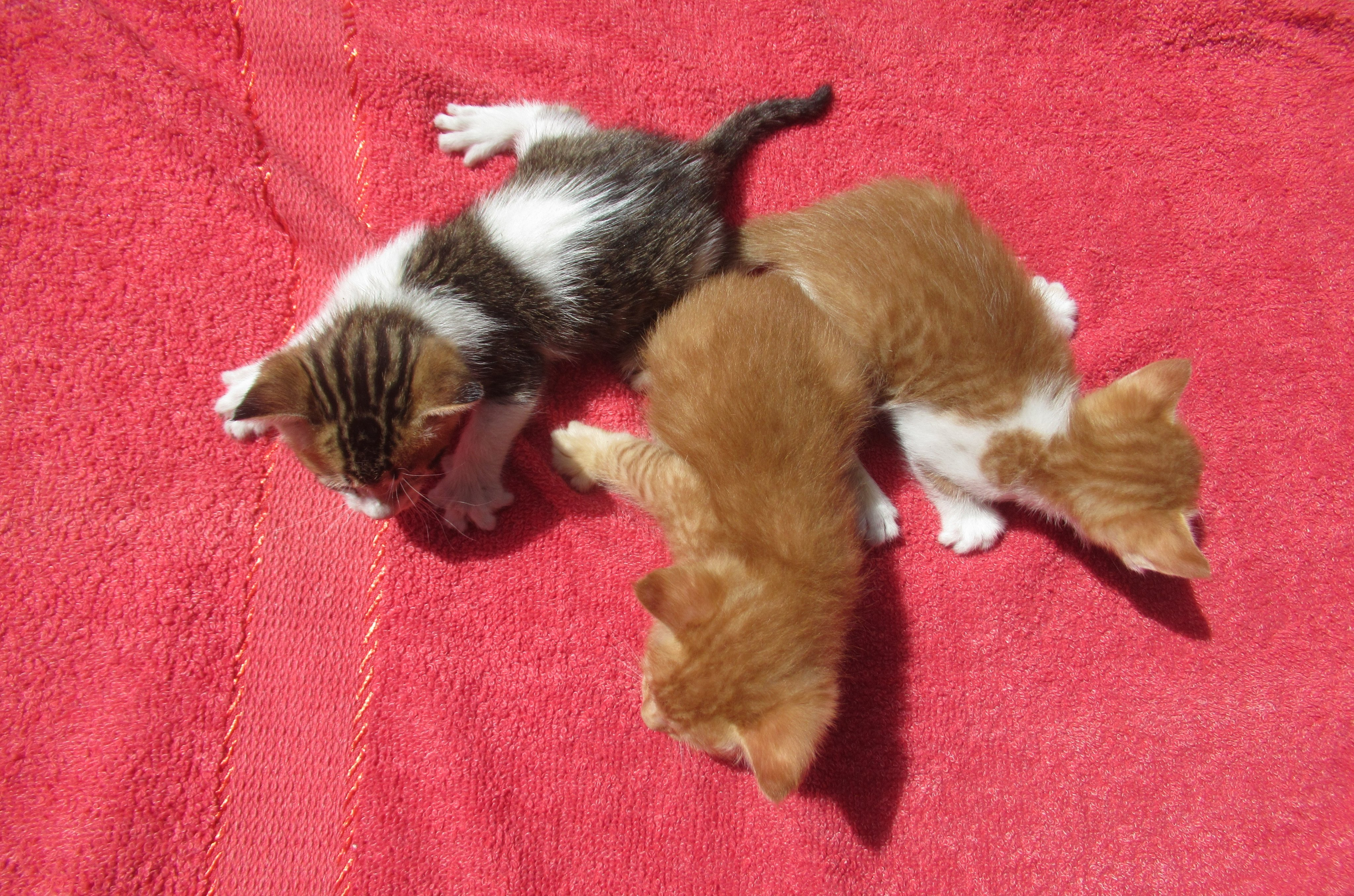
3 bicolor kittens "Puspin"

An Aspin is a mixed-breed dog in the Philippines, while Puspin is a mixed-breed cat. PAWS encourages the use of the term “Aspin” (Asong Pinoy) and “Puspin” (Pusang Pinoy) instead of “Askal” and “Pusakal”, because it showed that native dogs were just as cute, intelligent and as loyal as their purebred counterparts. Aspin and Puspin are now the politically correct term for native Filipino dog and cat breeds.

The PAWS Aspin Club is a non-profit organization registered with the Securities and Exchange Commission composed of native or mixed-breed dogs and their owners who want Aspins to get proper recognition and treatment in the Philippines. PAWS started the Aspin Club to promote all animal advocates’ lifelong dream of promoting the beauty and dignity of our local breed. The club provides an opportunity for owners to socialize their Aspins through fun pet activities like dog walks, pet photography sessions, canine picnics, basic obedience lessons, and such. It also aims to promote the welfare of Aspins through education, lobbying and campaigns.

=== Dr. Dog program ===
Dr. Dog is an animal-assisted therapy program founded by Jill Robinson, MBE of Animals Asia Foundation. Dr. Dog is a program run by Animals Asia. PAWS is Animals Asia's Philippine coordinator. PAWS' Dr. Dog program brings loving therapy dogs to children's hospitals all over the Manila metro area.

In 1997, "Pakko", a German Shepherd, was the first Dr. Dog. Dr. Dog provides comfort and emotional healing for disabled children, and educates the public about the value of animals in our society. In the Philippines, some ethnic groups consume dog meat as part of cultural or religious practices. PAWS hopes to change that by demonstrating how beneficial they are to humans.

=== Humane education ===
PAWS continues to work with Local Government Units in the Philippines in providing Humane Education and Responsible Pet Ownership Seminars to communities. PAWS also conduct different educational programs to promote Humane Education for students. These include school tours and visits; student interviews and lectures.

PAWS Humane Education lectures include safety around animals, responsible pet ownership, animal welfare and rights, proper management of animal control facilities among other things.

=== Animal captivity ===
PAWS is opposed to the capture of all animals for commercial, entertainment and sporting purposes. PAWS is for the phase-out of zoos. On the argument that there is no longer any place for these animals to be released to and those zoos ‘protect’ these species, PAWS believes that more effort should go into the preservation of these animals’ habitat.

In the interim, PAWS will work on the improvement of the condition of animals in zoos and constantly remind zoo owners that they have a responsibility to give every animal humane, professional care.

=== Dine with PAWS ===
PAWS’ annual charity dinner, Dine with PAWS, is held to help raise funds for the different programs and advocacies of the organization. The charity dinner showcases a “Doggy Buffet” where guests can bring their canine pals and enjoy sumptuous treats made especially for them. It is also the event where distinguished guests are inducted into the “Order of the Platinum Paws” for exemplary acts of selflessness in the promotion of animal welfare.

== Fight against animal cruelty ==
=== Dog Fighting/Racing ===
PAWS opposes any acts whereby humans incite, allow, or cause animals to fight. Dog fighting, cockfighting, and bullfighting are examples of animal “blood-sports,” which glorify violence for the sake of monetary gain, entertainment, or other purposes. These activities cause suffering, maiming, and death to the animals forced to participate, and they have negative social consequences. While dog fighting and horse fighting are illegal under the Animal Welfare Act, cockfighting is legal and was one of the concessions that the organization had to give when they were lobbying for the law. PAWS continues to campaign actively against any form of animal fighting.

PAWS opposes dog racing and is working against the entry of Greyhound racing in the Philippines. The profit-motivated industry of dog racing deprives dogs of normal social interaction, breeds and kills excessive numbers of dogs in the pursuit of faster animals, and forces dogs into a risky situation that often culminates in catastrophic injury.

=== Tambucho killing and euthanasia ===
The organization believes that euthanasia is sometimes unavoidable and is, under certain circumstances, an important service that is offered to animals. Euthanasia is the humane means of ending the suffering of an animal with an untreatable disease or one that is in physical distress. It is also used for animals that have severe behavioral problems that cannot be rehabilitated, including aggression since these animals cannot be adopted into a home because they pose a threat to the health and safety of people and other animals.

PAWS recommends using the methods that cause a rapid loss of consciousness and that cause minimal pain, distress, and suffering in the animal. PAWS opposes any euthanasia methods or techniques that do not meet these humane principles. PAWS opposes “tambucho” gassing and electrocution as methods of euthanasia.

=== Animal cruelty cases ===
The Philippine Animal Welfare Society has monitored more than a hundred cases of animal cruelty in the country a year, many of which are ignored due to the lack of stiff penalties against animal abuse. The organization receives an average of 40 calls on cases of animal abuse daily.

PAWS needs and encourages everyone to take action: report cases and/or file charges against people who committed animal cruelty. Volunteer lawyers are available to provide legal assistance to pet owners who cannot afford private lawyers or do not have enough information in filing cases.

== PAWS Animal Rehabilitation Center (PARC) ==
Philippine Animal Welfare Society (PAWS) Animal Rehabilitation Center

The Philippine Animal Welfare Society established the PAWS Animal Rehabilitation Center (PARC) as the first animal shelter with an active adoption and rehabilitation program in the Philippines. It aims to find new homes for the dogs and the cats through its adoption program.

PARC's construction formally started in September 2000, with funding from the International Fund for Animal Welfare and assistance from Don Manolo Lopez of Meralco. It had an informal operation in 2002.

=== Limited-Admission shelter ===
It is exclusively for animals in distress. An “animal in distress” is one that is suffering or is in imminent danger of losing its life. Not all animals in distress can be taken in at a given time due to the limited space & number of caretakers in the organization's shelter and due to its strict quarantine protocols.

PAWS has never advertised its shelter as a "NO-KILL" shelter. The organization strives to provide the best care for shelter animals as far as the space, time and financial resources will permit and continue to work at prevention of abandonment largely through educational campaigns.

=== Adoption ===
PAWS puts its rescued animals up for adoption and screens all adoption applicants. PAWS strongly encourages responsible pet ownership and one of its campaigns is to remind people that a pet is a lifetime commitment. Adopting will give an orphan animal a second chance in life. It will also help rescue another animal by making space available at the shelter. Adoptable cats and dogs are already spayed or neutered; vaccinated and rehabilitated. Adopted animals may be brought back to the shelter to get free basic obedience training and avail of free veterinary consultations and discounts on PARC clinic services (all by appointment).

=== Fostering ===
This is an opportunity for anyone who wants animal companionship but may not be able to commit to a long-term ownership/guardianship. Foster homes are also sought for kittens, puppies or sick animals that need constant attention. There are over three hundred cats and dogs at the shelter at any given time; a certain percentage of which are sick or are too young to be able to survive on their own without constant loving supervision.

=== Clinic and veterinary services ===
Among its facilities, is a veterinary clinic equipped with tools and equipment needed to conduct examination, treatment and surgery. The clinic offers low-cost services and is open to the public and indigent pet owners on Tuesdays, Thursdays, and Fridays and Saturdays (T-Th-F-Sat) at 1:30 - 3:00 pm for consultations only. Spay/Neuter surgeries are done by appointment from 3:00 - 7:00 pm on the same days. PARC's volunteer veterinarian is Dr. Wilford Almoro, DVM.

The clinic provides emergency veterinary treatments to all animals in distress. It also extends veterinary services to regular paying clientele, with strict adherence to standard veterinary fees. (In many instances PARC will refer clients to other private clinics) It gives all available information related to the medical needs of animals, as well as matters concerning their welfare.

==== Spaying and neutering ====
PARC's veterinary clinic offers a low-cost spaying and neutering of dogs and cats to solve the problem of pet overpopulation. Sterilization (Spaying/Neutering) in dogs/cats is a routine surgical procedure wherein the testicles of males (neutering) and ovaries and uterus of females (spaying) are removed. A veterinarian does the procedure while the animal is under sedation and general anesthesia. Sterilization is a method of population control for pets and for stray dogs/cats, which are at least 6 months old. Sterilization itself is a fast and simple procedure that is commonly done.

== Volunteer opportunities ==
The PAWS Volunteer Program is where people can share their talent and skills for the welfare of animals. Volunteers must be prepared to render at least eight (8) hours a month doing work at the shelter or outside the shelter for animal welfare to be in the active volunteer database. Volunteers can participate in the organization's campaigns, programs and other advocacies.

=== Canine Enrichment Team ===
Works in close coordination with volunteer trainers and senior volunteers or dog handlers with the task of making shelter dogs fit for adoption by socializing them and working on their behavioral problems like aggression, fear or shyness. Interested volunteers should have rabies pre-exposure shots and should undergo special training with the volunteer trainers and dog behaviorists.

=== Animal rescue, care and rehabilitation ===
Assists approved adopters, walk the dogs and/or puppies, socialize the cats/kittens, clean cages, help with feeding, bathing, medication and basic grooming as needed. After the eruption of Taal volcano in January 2020, volunteers of the group disaster team, together with the International Fund for Animal Welfare, organized relief operations at the evacuation center and found and fed abandoned pet dogs, cows and other livestock. They also sought donations of cow feed, chicken feed, dog food, cat food, and bottled water for these stranded animals.

=== Events, lobbying and legal campaigns ===
The team complements all the major projects of the organization with flyers, posters, endorsements, organizing rallies, etc. They represent PAWS in local events where the organization is actively participating, helps in manning event booths and selling merchandise. They help out in organizing events to raise funds for the shelter.

=== Humane education ===
See Humane Education

PAWS gives presentations at schools regarding responsible pet ownership, pet handling and safety, overpopulation and endangered species.

== See also ==
- Animal protection
- Animal welfare
