= Daisy Avellana =

Filipino stage actress and theater director

Daisy Hontiveros-Avellana
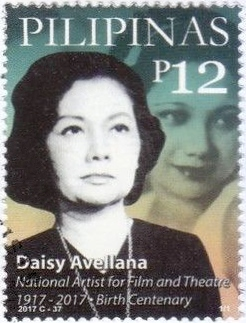
- Avellana on a 2017 stamp of the Philippines
- Born: Lourdes Genoveva Dolores Pardo Hontiveros; January 26, 1917; Roxas, Capiz, Philippine Islands
- Died: May 12, 2013 (aged 96); Manila, Philippines
- Resting place: Loyola Memorial Park Marikina, Philippines
- Occupations: Actress, Theater director
- Spouse: Lamberto Avellana (m. 1938; died 1991)
- Parents: Jose Hontiveros (father); Vicenta Ruiz Pardo (mother)
- Relatives: Eduardo Hontiveros (brother); Nita Hontiveros-Lichauco (sister); Jose Mari Avellana (son); Risa Hontiveros (niece); Pia Hontiveros (niece)
- Awards: Order of National Artists of the Philippines

Daisy Avellana (January 26, 1917 – May 12, 2013) was a Filipino stage actress and theater director. Avellana was honored as a National Artist of the Philippines for Theater and Film in 1999.

== Early life and education ==
Avellana was born Lourdes Genoveva Dolores Pardo Hontiveros on January 26, 1917, in Capiz, Capiz, (now Roxas City). She was the eldest child of Jose Hontiveros and Vicenta Ruiz Pardo.

Avellana was one of the first graduates of the UST Graduate School with Master of Arts (MA) in English.

== Personal life ==
Her husband was Lamberto Avellana, a film and stage director who was also named a National Artist in 1976. Daisy and Lamberto Avellana co-founded the Barangay Theater Guild (BTG), together with forty-eight colleagues, in 1939. They had four children, the second being actor and director Jose Mari Avellana.

== Death ==
Avellana died on May 11, 2013, at the age of 96.
