= Lamberto V. Avellana =

Filipino film and stage director

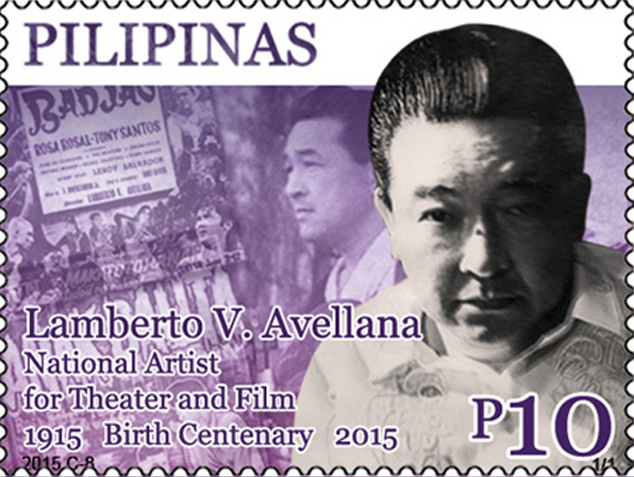
- Born: Lamberto Villa Avellana; February 12, 1915; Bontoc, Mountain Province, Philippine Islands
- Died: April 25, 1991 (aged 76); Pasig, Philippines
- Resting place: Loyola Memorial Park Marikina, Philippines
- Occupation: Film director
- Years active: 1939–1982
- Spouse: Daisy Avellana (m. 1938)
- Children: Jose Mari Avellana
- Relatives: Jose Antonio Avellana
- Awards: Order of National Artists of the Philippines

Lamberto Vera Avellana NA (February 12, 1915 – April 25, 1991) was a prominent Filipino film and stage director. Despite considerable budgetary limitations that hampered the post-war Filipino film industry, Avellana's films such as Anak Dalita and Badjao attained international acclaim. In 1976, Avellana was named by President Ferdinand Marcos as the first National Artist of the Philippines for Film. While Avellana remains an important figure in Filipino cinema, his reputation as a film director has since been eclipsed by the next wave of Filipino film directors who emerged in the 1970s, such as Lino Brocka and Ishmael Bernal.

== Life ==
Born in Bontoc, Mountain Province, Avellana was educated at the Ateneo de Manila AB '37, where he developed what turned out to be a lifelong interest in the theater. He taught at the Ateneo after graduation and married his teenage sweetheart Daisy Hontiveros, an actress who eventually also became a National Artist in 1999.

== Film career ==
Avellana made his film debut with Sakay in 1939, a biopic on the early 20th-century Filipino revolutionary Macario Sakay. The film, though a box-office flop, was particularly distinguished for its realism, which was atypical of Filipino cinema at the time. The treatment is the subject of some controversy today. Avellana's Sakay toed the line with the American-fostered perception of Sakay as a mere bandit, different from the current-day appreciation of Sakay as a fighter for Filipino independence. Raymond Red's 1993 film, Sakay hews closer to this modern view of Sakay.

Leopoldo Salcedo, who played Sakay in the 1939 Avellana version, portrayed Sakay's father in the 1993 version in his final film role.

Avellana directed more than 70 films in a career that spanned six decades. In the early 1950s, he coined the term "bakya crowd" (lit. 'wooden clog crowd') to describe the mass audiences who went to see his films. Anak Dalita (1956) and Badjao (1957) perhaps stand as the most prominent works from his oeuvre. Anak Dalita, which was named Best Film at the 1956 Asia-Pacific Film Festival, was a realistic portrayal of poverty-stricken Filipinos coping with the aftermath of World War II. Badjao was a love-story set in Mindanao between a man from a sea-dwelling indigenous Badjao family and a woman belonging to a prominent Tausug clan. Rolf Bayer was the screenwriter for both films.

In July 1974, Avellana served as program director for the "Kasaysayan ng Lahi" (lit. 'History of the Race') parade held by President Ferdinand Marcos and his wife Imelda Marcos to inaugurate the newly-built Folk Arts Theater (since renamed Tanghalang Francisco Balagtas) weeks prior to the building's use as the venue for Miss Universe 1974. Approximately 22,000 people participated in the parade, which included 50 tribal groups, and was choreographed by Lucrecia Reyes Urtula. A documentary of the event was shot and directed by cinematographer Dik Trofeo, with Avellana serving as its narrator and consultant.

On December 30, 1990, Avellana directed the first live reenactment of José Rizal's execution to be held on Rizal Day in Rizal Park.

== Death ==
Avellana died on April 25, 1991, in Pasig, Philippines, at the age of 76.

== Filmography ==
=== Film ===
==== As director ====
Year	Title	Production company	Notes
1939	Sakay	Filippine Productions	
1940	Alitaptap	Waling-waling Productions	
1940	Inday	Waling-waling Productions	
1941	Rosalinda	LVN Pictures	
1941	Ikaw Pala	LVN Pictures	
1946	Death March	Filippine Productions	
1947	Haciendera	Corazon Roque Productions and Phils. Artist Guild	
1947	Tandang Sora		
1947	Sa Ngiti Mo Lamang	Eduque Productions	
1947	The End of the Road	Ateneo Alumni Association	
1947	Hagibis		
1948	Pista ng Bayan	Nolasco Bros.	
1948	A La Viva!	Philartech Productions	
1948	Lukso ng Dugo	Avellana and Company	
1949	Ronquillo: Tiagong Akyat		
1950	Hantik		
1950	Ang Bombero (Kaaway ng Apoy)		
1950	Prinsipe Amante		
1950	In Despair		
1951	Satur		
1951	Prinsipe Amante sa Rubitanya	LVN Pictures	
1951	Pag-asa		
1951	Amor Mio		
1952	Korea	LVN Pictures	
1952	Aklat ng Buhay		
1952	Haring Solomon at Reyna Sheba	LVN Pictures	
1953	Loida: Ang Aking Pag-ibig		
1953	Huk sa Bagong Pamumuhay		
1953	Hiyasmin	LVN Pictures	
1954	Kandelerong Pilak		
1955	Lapu-Lapu		
1955	Saydwok Bendor		
1956	No Money, No Honey		
1956	Anak Dalita	LVN Pictures	
1956	Medalyong Perlas ("Eskirol" segment)		
1956	Kumander 13		
1957	Walang Sugat		
1957	Badjao		
1957	Rosalina		
1958	Faithful		
1958	Sergeant Hassan	Malay Film Productions	
1959	Kundiman ng Lahi		
1959	Cry Freedom		
1961	Bus to Bataan		
1963	Death Was a Stranger	Hunters' ROTC Association.	
1963	No Way Out	Tamaraw Productions	
1964	Scout Rangers	Zultana International	
1965	Tagumpay ng Mahirap ("The Boy" segment)	Cinema Masters	
1965	A Portrait of the Artist as Filipino	Daudem Pictures and Cinema Artists	
1965	Operation XYZ	Lea Productions	
1966	Claudia	Lea Productions	
1968	Destination: Vietnam	Paramount-Philippines	
1968	Kumander Dimas	Regina Productions	
1973	Ang Bukas Ay Atin	CS Films Productions	
1974	Fe, Esperanza, Caridad	Premiere Productions	co-direc. with Cirio H. Santiago, Gerardo de Leon
1975	Kapitan Kulas: Ang Kilabot ng Sierra Madre	Lea Productions	
1975	Ang Pag-ibig Ko'y Huwag Mong Sukatin	Lea Productions	
1977	Tadhana: Ito ang Lahing Pilipino	National Media Production Center	Unreleased film
1978	Manuel L. Quezon: A Man and His Dreams	National Media Production Center	Short documentary film
1982	Waywaya	Four-N Films and Nard Guerrero Films & Associates	

=== As narrator ===
Year	Title	Production company	Notes
1974	Kasaysayan ng Lahi	National Media Production Center	Also consultant

== Accolades ==
Year	Award-giving body	Category	Nominated work(s)	Result
1954	FAMAS Awards	Best Director	Huk sa Bagong Pamumuhay	Won
1956	Asia Pacific Film Festival	Best Film	Child of Sorrow	Won

== Additional sources ==
- Filipinos in History: Volume III, National Historical Institute (Manila, 1996)
