= Ambeth Ocampo =

Filipino historian

Ambeth Ocampo OL PMM KGOR OMC OAL
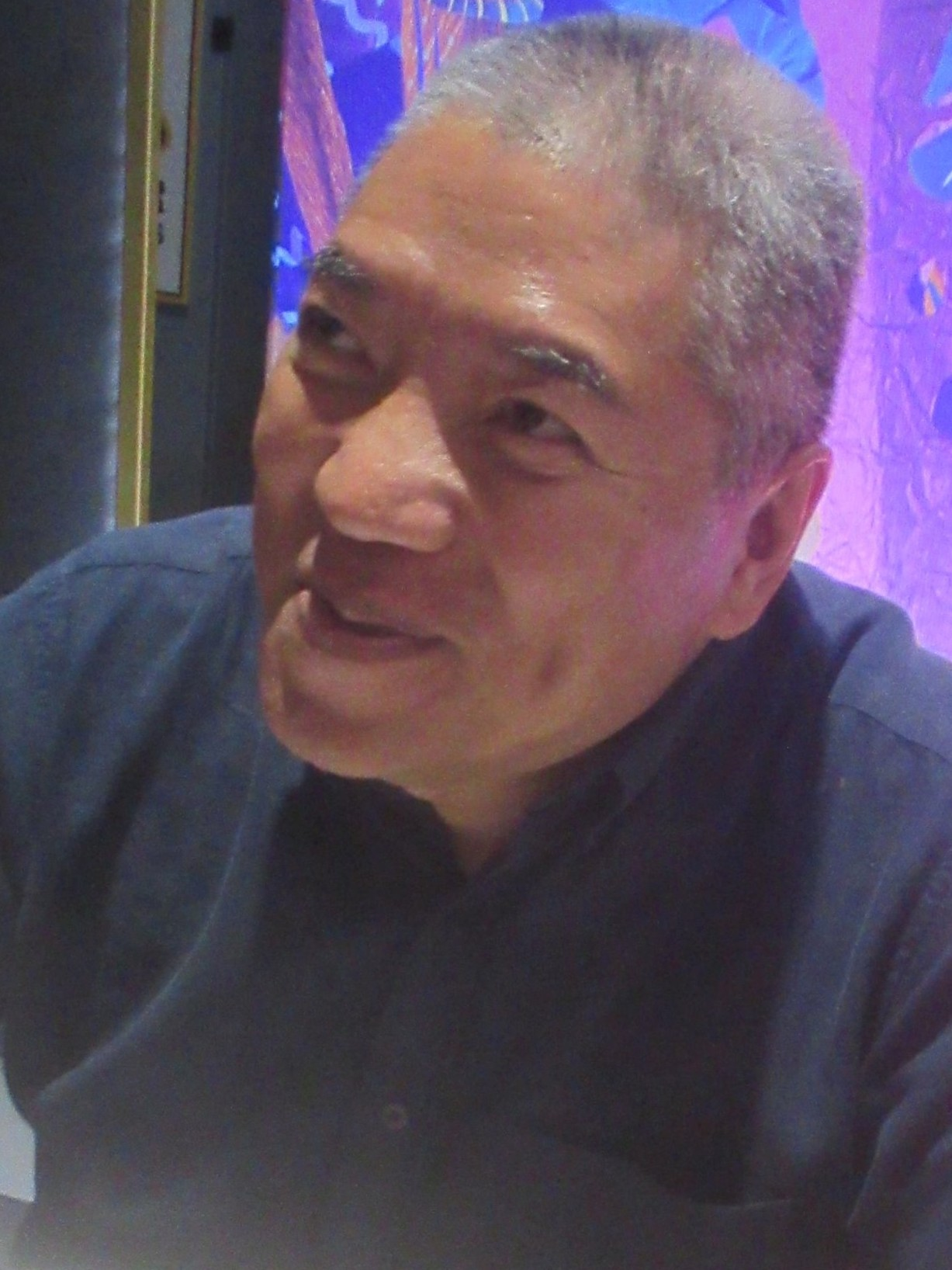
- Ocampo in 2026

Chairman of the National Historical Commission of the Philippines
- In office April 2002 – April 7, 2011
- Appointed by: Gloria Macapagal Arroyo
- Succeeded by: Maria Serena I. Diokno

Chairman of the National Commission for Culture and the Arts
- In office 2005–2007

Personal details
- Born: Ambeth Raymundo Ocampo; August 13, 1961 (age 65) Manila, Philippines
- Education: Ateneo de Manila University; De La Salle University (BA, MA); University of the Philippines Diliman; SOAS University of London
- Occupation: Public historian; Cultural administrator; Journalist; Author; Independent curator
- Awards: Full list
- Website: https://ambethocampo.com/

Ambeth Ocampo (born in Manila, 1961) is a Filipino public historian, academic, cultural administrator, journalist, author, and independent curator. He is best known for his definitive writings about Philippines' national hero José Rizal, and for popularizing Philippine history and art through Looking Back, his long-running editorial page column in the Philippine Daily Inquirer, as well as his bestselling book Rizal Without the Overcoat.

In academia, Ocampo serves as a professor of history at the Ateneo de Manila University and has lectured at various universities both locally and abroad. In government service, he served as chairman of the National Historical Commission of the Philippines from 2002 until 2011, and concurrently as chairman of the National Commission for Culture and the Arts from 2005 to 2007. He also served as a long-time adviser to the Bangko Sentral ng Pilipinas Numismatic Committee, aiding in the redesign of the country's currency.

A prominent figure in the public defense of history against historical distortion in the Philippines, Ocampo has curated numerous museum exhibitions and published over 35 books. For his contributions to academic, cultural, and social progress, he has been conferred accolades such as the Order of Lakandula, the Presidential Medal of Merit, the French Ordre des Arts et des Lettres, and the 2016 Fukuoka Prize for Academia.

== Early life and education ==
Ocampo was born in Manila in 1961. He received his primary and secondary education at the Basic Education Department of Ateneo de Manila University. He subsequently obtained his undergraduate and masteral degrees in Philippine Studies from the De La Salle University in 1989 and 1991. His undergraduate thesis Food in Pampango Culture was on Kapampangan cuisine, while his masteral thesis was on his recovery of the third unfinished novel of José Rizal, Makamisa during his term as a consultant to the National Library of the Philippines later published as Makamisa: The Search for Rizal's Third Novel in 1992.

He took graduate courses at the University of the Philippines Diliman, and later read for a doctorate in Southeast Asian History at the University of London School of Oriental and African Studies (SOAS). He abandoned his London postgraduate studies in 1993, when he entered the Our Lady of Montserrat Abbey as a Benedictine monk under the monastic name Dom. Ignacio Maria Ocampo, O.S.B. He subsequently left the monastery in 1997.

== Career ==
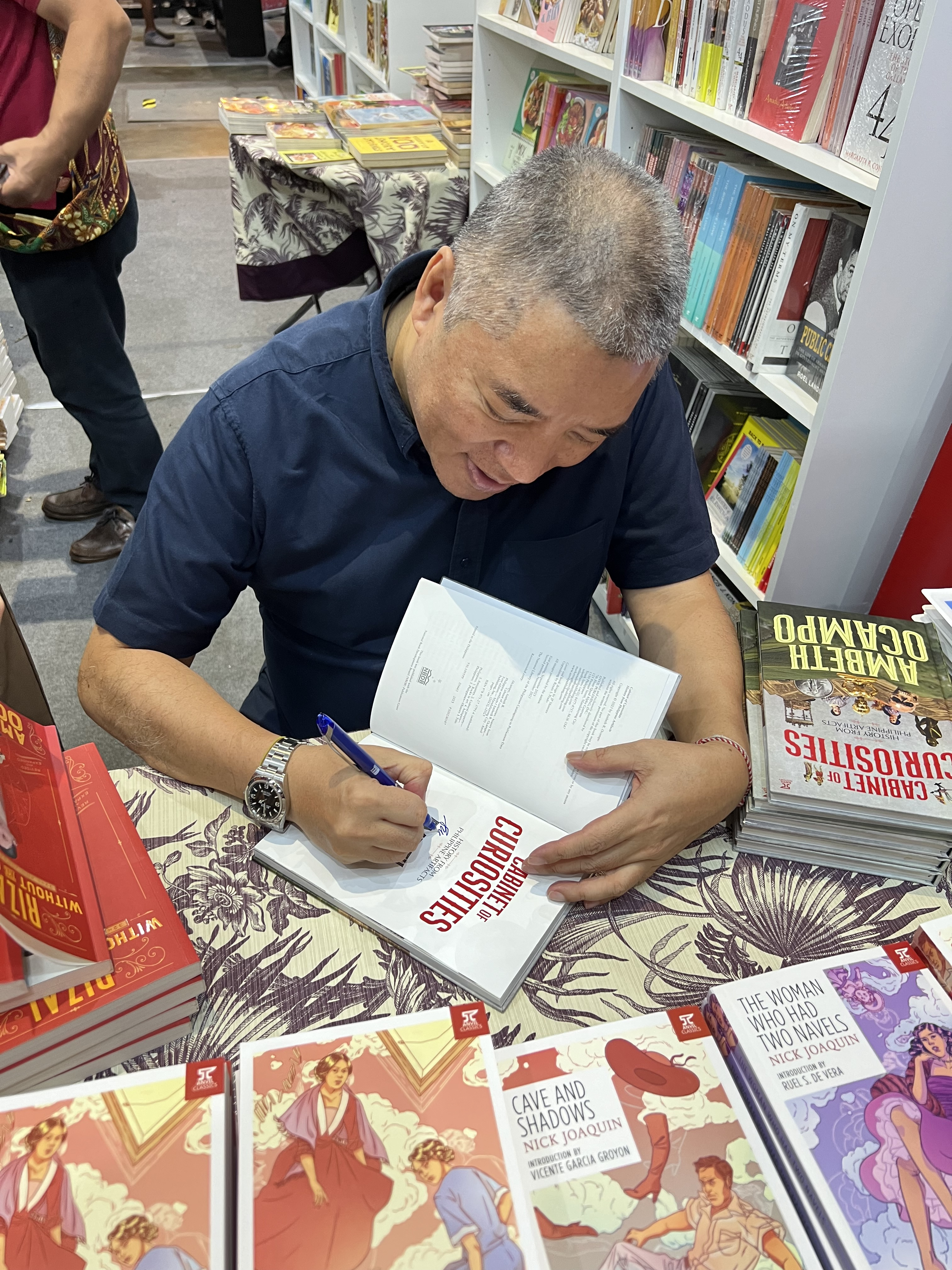
Ocampo signing copies of his books during the Philippine Book Festival in 2024.

=== Writings ===
==== Looking Back column ====
Ocampo began writing for Weekend Magazine, the Sunday supplement of the Philippine Daily Express in 1985 and subsequently joined its editorial staff as an associate editor. His column Looking Back first appeared in the Philippine Daily Globe from 1987 to 1990, and compilations of these columns saw new life as his two bestselling books; namely, the Looking Back series and Rizal Without the Overcoat that was awarded the National Book Award for essay in 1990. At the invitation of Letty Jimenez Magsanoc and Eugenia D. Apostol, Ocampo's Daily Globe column moved to the Philippine Daily Inquirer in 1990, where it appears twice weekly on the opinion-editorial page.

On cuisine as historical artifact his undergraduate thesis was published as a monograph Manyaman: Food in Pampango Culture. In 2001, he also co-authored an essay Grande Cuisine in the Philippines with Philippine food historian and academic Doreen Fernandez published in an issue of the British food academic journal Petits Propos Culinaires.

==== Writings and research on Rizal ====
Since 1986, Ocampo has published more than 35 books and other publications that have consisted of compilations of his various essays, and writings on Philippine history, arts, and culture. Most of his published works have focused on the life and works of the Philippine nationalist and martyr, Jose Rizal with Rizal Without the Overcoat going into six editions since its first publication in 1990. He has also annotated the second edition of Rizal in Saga: A Life for Student Fans written by National Artist Nick Joaquin that includes newly uncovered research material collated by Ocampo and photographs from his private collection in 2021.

In addition, he has published monographs on other historical and cultural figures in Philippine history, including musical composer Nicanor Abelardo, historian Teodoro Agoncillo and Teodora Alonso, the mother of Rizal, amongst others.

Ocampo has written about the history of foreign relations of the Philippines including France, Japan, Mexico, Singapore and the Czech Republic.

He was appointed chairman of the National Historical Institute (present-day National Historical Commission of the Philippines) in 2002 and later elected chair of the National Commission for Culture and the Arts (NCCA) in 2005. Then-President Gloria Macapagal Arroyo declared that she was an ardent reader of his newspaper column, commending his writings because he "makes history so approachable". In response to criticism for his populist approach to historiography, he has since released two compilations of his public lectures, Meaning and History focused on Jose Rizal and Bones of Contention on Andres Bonifacio both published in 2001, complete with citations and footnotes. Nevertheless, Ocampo is considered one of the most prominent Philippine historians today.

In recent years, he has written numerous articles on late former Philippine president and dictator Ferdinand Marcos compiling all known extant entries of his diaries collated from six different sources, and annotating them. The diaries have yet to be published in its entirety. In 2021, his fifteenth compilation of his columns of his Looking Back series written based on the diaries of Marcos and the legacies of the martial law regime titled Martial Law was published becoming his first publication on Philippine contemporary history. In 2024, Ocampo interviewed contemporary artist Pio Abad, who visually documents the ill-gotten wealth of the Marcos family.

In 2022, Ocampo became the subject of a massive troll attack from social media influencers with ties to President Bongbong Marcos after commenting on the controversial remarks of actress Ella Cruz who described Philippine history as "tsismis" (gossip), calling it "filtered" and "biased", that drew widespread condemnation on social media. In response, academics and Ateneo de Manila University denounced the attack on Ocampo and issued messages in support of the historian due to the ongoing attempts of historical distortion on martial law regime of the dictator.

=== Art historian and curator ===
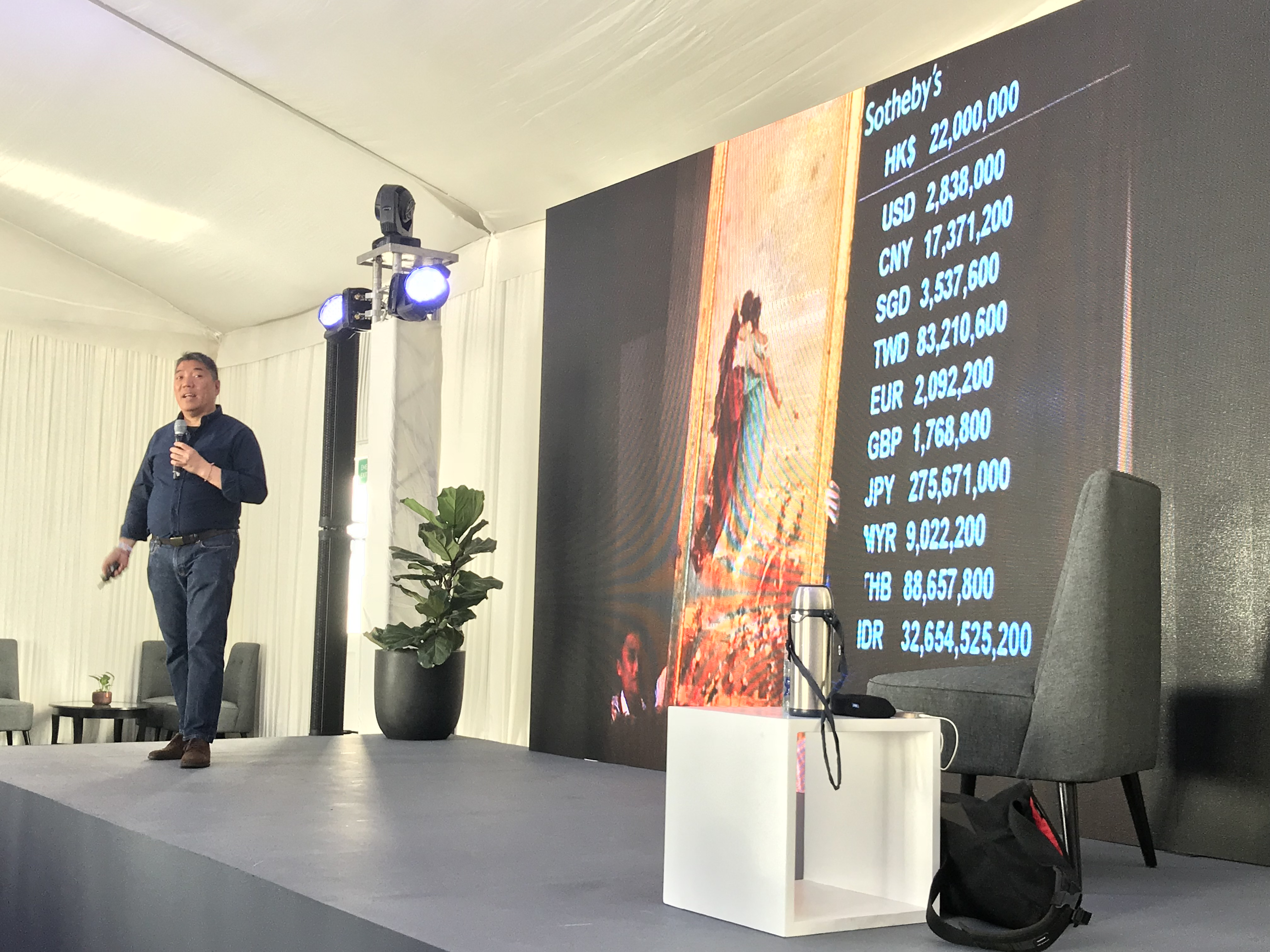
Ocampo giving a lecture on Philippine collectors and stewardship at the Art Fair Philippines in 2018.

Ocampo presently sits on the advisory boards of the Ateneo Art Gallery, the Ayala Museum, the BenCab Museum, the Lopez Museum, and the President Elpidio Quirino Foundation.

Ocampo has also written several essays and monographs on Philippine art, beginning with his first book on Philippine modern impressionist painter Emilio Aguilar Cruz titled The Paintings of E. Aguilar Cruz published in 1986. In 2019, a new version of the said book was revised, expanded, and published as E. Aguilar Cruz: The Writer as Painter.

Since then, Ocampo has worked as an independent curator and has curated several landmark artist retrospectives and exhibitions on Philippine visual artists, including Juan Luna, Fernando Amorsolo, Guillermo Tolentino, Romulo Galicano, Arturo Luz, Benedicto Cabrera and Elmer Borlongan.

He has also written or contributed publications on the biography and art of several contemporary artists, including those of Spanish-Philippine artists Fernando Zóbel and Juvenal Sansó, visual artist and fashion designer Mark Lewis Lim Higgins and contemporary artists Randalf Dilla and Pio Abad.

As an art historian, Ocampo has written several critiques on the controversies surrounding the Philippine art market. In 1985, in an essay titled Are these fake Rizal drawings?, he questioned the authenticity of drawings that were purportedly done by Rizal that were used as visual aids in the noted biography of the Philippine nationalist: José Rizal: Filipino Doctor and Patriot by José Baron Fernandez. The issue later resurfaced in 1990, when Ocampo engaged in a heated word war with former Philippine politician Manuel Morato who published these drawings in the said book.

Since then, Ocampo has continued providing commentaries on other issues on Philippine art, including the 2019 sale of Camote Diggers considered the last artwork by National Artist Botong Francisco and the provenance of an boceto of the Spoliarium by Juan Luna in 2018.

Consequently, Ocampo has also conducted extensive research on Philippine antiquities including Christian art, Southeast Asian ceramics, maps, and furniture. Several of his essays were compiled in the ninth compilation of his Looking Back series titled Demonyo Tables: History in Artifacts published in 2015.

Since 2011, Ocampo has delivered public lectures on Philippine history and culture primarily at the Ayala Museum known as the History Comes Alive series to sold-out crowds.

== Government service ==
=== Cultural administrator ===
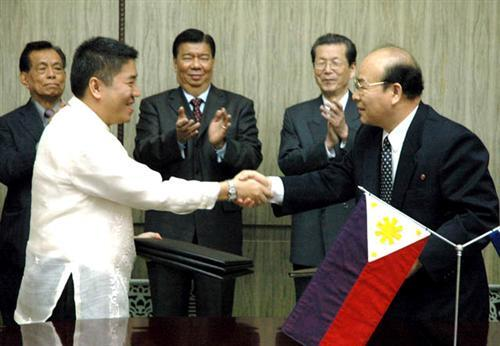
Ocampo then as NCCA Chairman shaking hands with Mun Jae Choi, acting chairman of the North Korean Committee on Foreign-Cultural Relations during the signing of the RP-DPRK Cultural Cooperation Agreement in Pyongyang, North Korea in 2006.

From 1987 until 1992, Ocampo served as a consultant to the National Library of the Philippines (NLP) with a concurrent capacity as a member of the National Committee on Libraries and Information Services (NCLIS) and the National Committee on Monuments and Sites (NCMS) under the Presidential Commission on Culture and the Arts (the present-day National Commission for Culture and the Arts (NCCA)). During his term at the National Library, he recovered the unpublished manuscripts of Rizal's unfinished novel Makamisa in 1987 and later worked on the bibliographic catalog of papers, writings and documents related to Rizal held in the vault of the National Library.

From 1996-1998, Ocampo was Co-Chair, with Carmen Guerrero Nakpil, of the Manila Historical and Heritage Commission.

In 1999, Ocampo was appointed board member of the National Historical Institute (present-day National Historical Commission of the Philippines (NHCP)) by President Joseph Estrada. Subsequently, in 2002, he was appointed chairman by President Gloria Macapagal Arroyo. During his term as its chairman, Ocampo weathered criticism over attempts to enforce provisions of the existing Flag and Heraldic Code of the Philippines by reminding artists singing the Philippine national anthem during international boxing matches of the proper way to sing the anthem, and his controversial decision to paint the Rizal clan house green – to remind Filipinos that the word "Rizal" came from "ricial" meaning a green field ready for harvest.

As NHCP Chairman, Ocampo served as a ex officio board member in the Intramuros Administration and the National Commission for Culture and the Arts (NCCA), the Philippine government agency responsible for culture. Elected NCCA chairman, he served from 2005 to 2007. During that time, he signed cultural agreements and executive programs on culture and heritage on behalf of the Philippines due to his rank of Cabinet-level position with France, Mexico, Pakistan, the People's Republic of China, and North Korea.

=== Member of the Numismatic Committee ===
From 2002 to 2011, Ocampo served as adviser to the Bangko Sentral ng Pilipinas Numismatic Committee that deliberated on the redesign of banknotes and coins in the Philippines. Ocampo and other members of the Numismatic Committee deliberated on the designs of the New Generation Currency Series including the redesign of the five hundred-peso banknotes which featured the portraits of Philippine opposition leader Benigno Aquino Jr. and his wife, President Corazon Aquino following national clamor after the death and funeral of the president in 2009.

Ocampo has written extensively on Philippine numismatics in a series of articles, particularly on the controversies surrounding currency design and its political context. In 2020, the Bangko Sentral ng Pilipinas published Ocampo's Yaman: The History and Heritage in Philippine Money, a coffee table book on the numismatic collection of the Philippine central bank.

== In academia ==
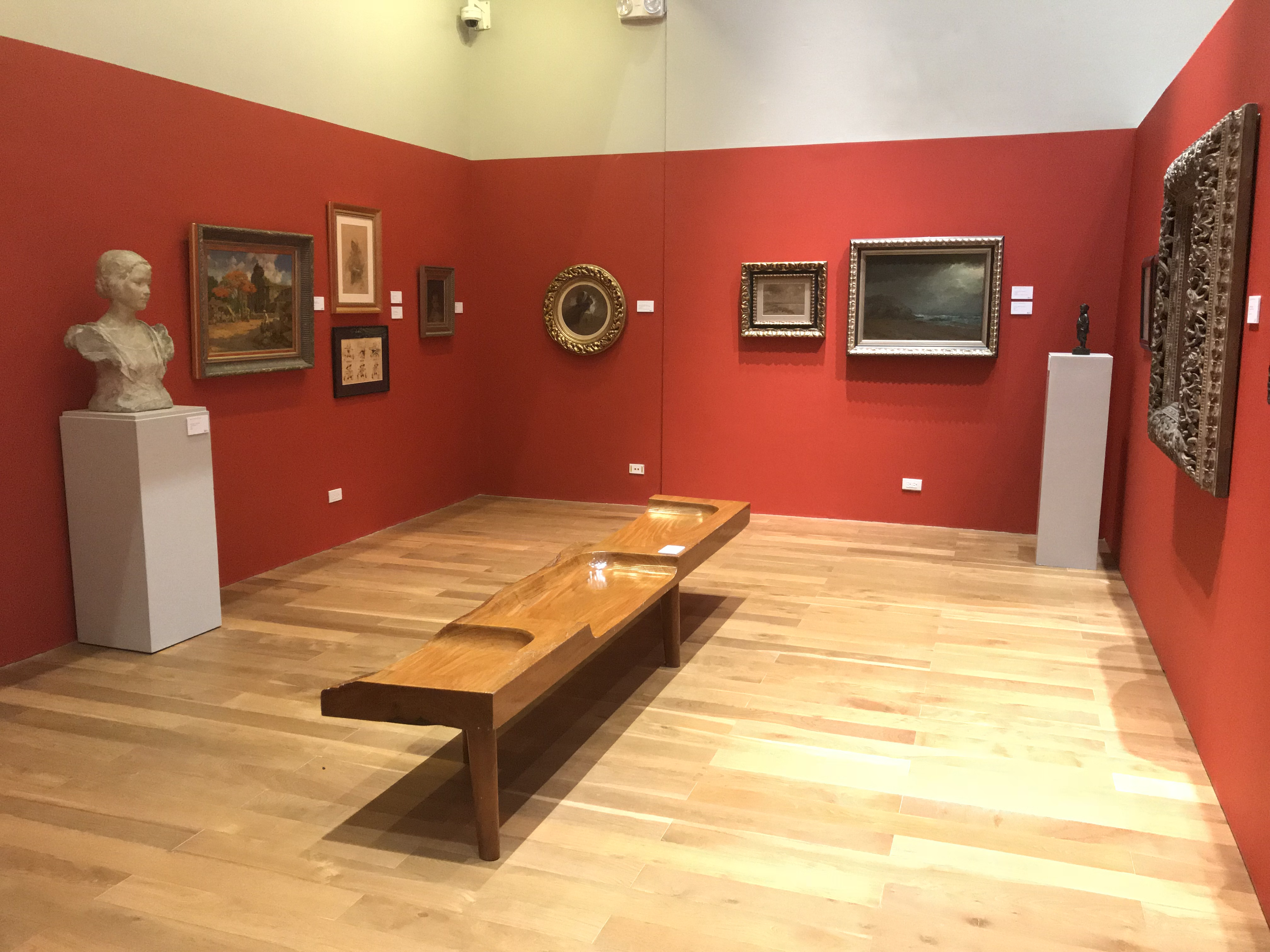
Layout of the Bequest of Ambeth R. Ocampo in the Ateneo Art Gallery in 2018.

Ocampo is currently Senator Gil J. Puyat Professor in History at the Ateneo de Manila University, Distinguished Professorial Lecturer at the De La Salle University, and Professorial Lecturer at the University of the Philippines. He served as chairman of the Department of History, School of Social Sciences in the Ateneo de Manila University. He is visiting research fellow, Institute of Asian Cultures, Sophia University, Tokyo, Japan and research associate, Center for Southeast Asian Studies, University of Michigan at Ann Arbor in the United States. He previously served as professorial lecturer in the Department of Filipino and Philippine Literature, College of Arts and Letters, University of the Philippines Diliman from 1989 until 2010 and served on the board of regents of the Universidad de Manila (formerly City College of Manila), where he served as its president and vice president for academic affairs from 1996 to 1998. He has also held previous appointments at the De La Salle University, Far Eastern University, and San Beda College. He has previously held professorial chairs at the Universidad de Manila and the Polytechnic University of the Philippines.

He has held appointments as visiting research fellow in Kyoto University, and Chulalongkorn University, Bangkok. As visiting professor at the University of Michigan, Ann Arbor and Sophia University, Tokyo, where he taught courses on Philippine history and culture.

His personal and official papers, notes, and correspondence are deposited in the University of the Philippines Archives in Diliman, Quezon City, Philippines.

A collector of Filipiniana, his extensive library and collection is divided between his home in Metro Manila; his office at the Department of History at the Ateneo de Manila University, the Center for Southeast Asian Studies Library in Kyoto University, and the Center for Kapampangan Studies of the Holy Angel University.

Part of his collection of Philippine Art was bequeathed to the Ateneo Art Gallery with one of its wings named in his honor as the Ambeth R. Ocampo Gallery.

== Honors, awards, and decorations ==
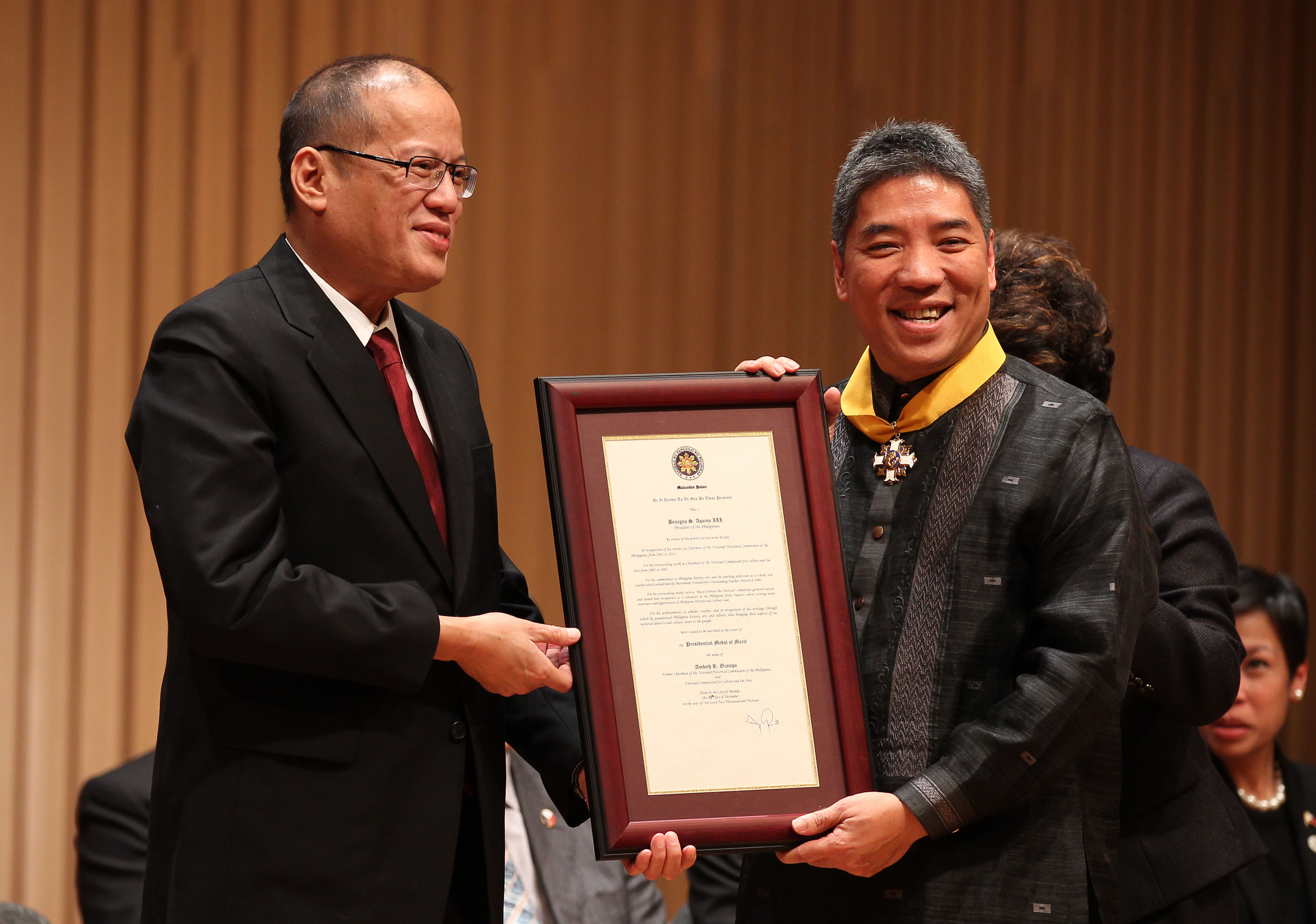
President Benigno Aquino III awarded Ocampo the Presidential Medal of Merit during his state visit to Tokyo, Japan in 2013.

As an outstanding historian and intellectual, Dr. Ambeth R. Ocampo has made a great contribution to academic, cultural, and social progress in the Philippines, through his university teaching, and his writing for newspapers and magazines, and his service in historic and cultural administration. His clear and accessible explanations of the wider global context in which the country developed during the period of the Spanish and American colonial regimes have helped promote a more open sense of nationalism, and facilitated the advancement of international exchanges both with Asia and with the West.

— Citation for the 2016 Fukuoka Prize.

Ocampo has won three National Book Awards in these categories: Essay, Literary History, and Bibliography. He was awarded the Premio Manuel Bernabe from the Centro Cultural de la Embajada de Espana en Filipinas and a Premio Quijano de Manila from the Instituto Cervantes Manila. He was elected National Fellow for Essay by the University of the Philippines Creative Writing Center (1995–1996).

He has been conferred the rank of Knight Grand Officer (K.G.O.R.) of the Order of the Knights of Rizal in December 2018, and Order of Civil Merit with the rank of Encomienda (Commander) conferred by the Kingdom of Spain in December 2007.

In June 2008, he was conferred the rank of Officier in the Ordre des Arts et Lettres by the Republic of France for his contributions to the arts and letters as a writer, academic, and cultural administrator, and for his support of cultural exchanges between the Philippines and France.

In recognition of his work in cultural administration and his contributions to Philippine history, the Polytechnic University of the Philippines conferred on him the degree of Doctor of Public Administration, honoris causa, in December 2008.

In 2010, he was conferred one of the highest civilian awards of the Philippines, the Order of Lakandula with the rank of Bayani for his contributions in cultural administration, the popularization of Philippine history, and for having served as chairman of the National Historical Institute (present-day, the National Historical Commission of the Philippines) from 2002 to 2010, and concurrent chairman of the National Commission for Culture and the Arts (NCCA) from 2005 until 2007 without compensation.

In December 2013, during the state visit of President Benigno Aquino III to Tokyo, Ocampo was conferred the Presidential Medal of Merit whose citation reads, "for his achievements as a scholar, teacher, and in recognition of his writings through which he popularized Philippine history, art and culture thus bringing these aspects of our national identity closer to the people."

In September 2016, Ocampo was awarded the prestigious Fukuoka Prize (Academic) for his contributions to Philippine history and culture making him the fifth Filipino to be so honored with the recognition.

== Honours ==
=== National honors ===
- Philippines:
  - Order of Lakandula (Bayani) - 2010
  - Presidential Medal of Merit - 2013
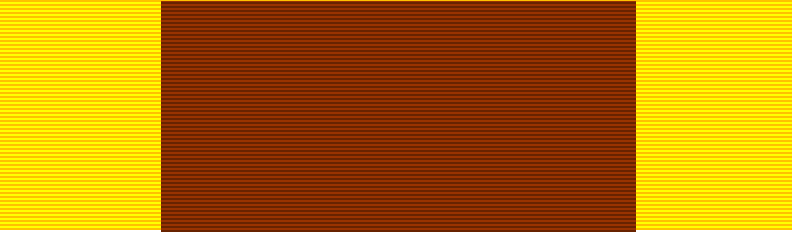
  - Knight Grand Officer (K.G.O.R), Order of the Knights of Rizal - 2018

=== Foreign honors ===
- Spain:
  - Order of Civil Merit with the rank of Commander (Encomienda) (2007)
- France:
  - Ordre des Arts et des Lettres with the rank of Officer (Officier) (2008)

=== Awards ===
- Philippines: National Book Award (Essay) (1990)
- Philippines: Philippine National Book Award (Literary History) (1992)
- Philippines: Philippine National Book Award (Bibliography) (1993)
- Japan: Fukuoka Academic Prize (2016)

==== Honorary degrees ====
- Philippines: Polytechnic University of the Philippines: Public Administration (2008)
