= Anvil Publishing =

Philippine publishing company

Anvil Publishing, Inc.
- Parent company: National Book Store
- Status: Private
- Founded: February 1990; 36 years ago
- Founder: Karina Bolasco
- Country of origin: Philippines
- Headquarters location: 7/F Quad Alpha Centrum Building, 125 Pioneer Street, Mandaluyong
- Distribution: Nationwide
- Publication types: Books
- Imprints: Bliss Books
- Revenue: US$465.8 thousand (2019)
- Owner: Alexandra “Xandra” Ramos-Padilla
- No. of employees: ~51 to 200
- Official website: www.anvilpublishing.com

Anvil Publishing, Inc., is the publishing arm of National Book Store. It publishes print books, e-books, and audiobooks.

Anvil is a nationwide book dealer to network servicing dealers in the Philippines which includes National Book Store (Anvil's parent company), Goodwill Book Store, Rex Book Store, and Solidaridad.

Anvil is an eleven-time Publisher of the Year awardee of the National Book Awards, as cited by the Manila Critics Circle.

== History ==
In 2016, founder Karina Bolasco left the company after 25 years.

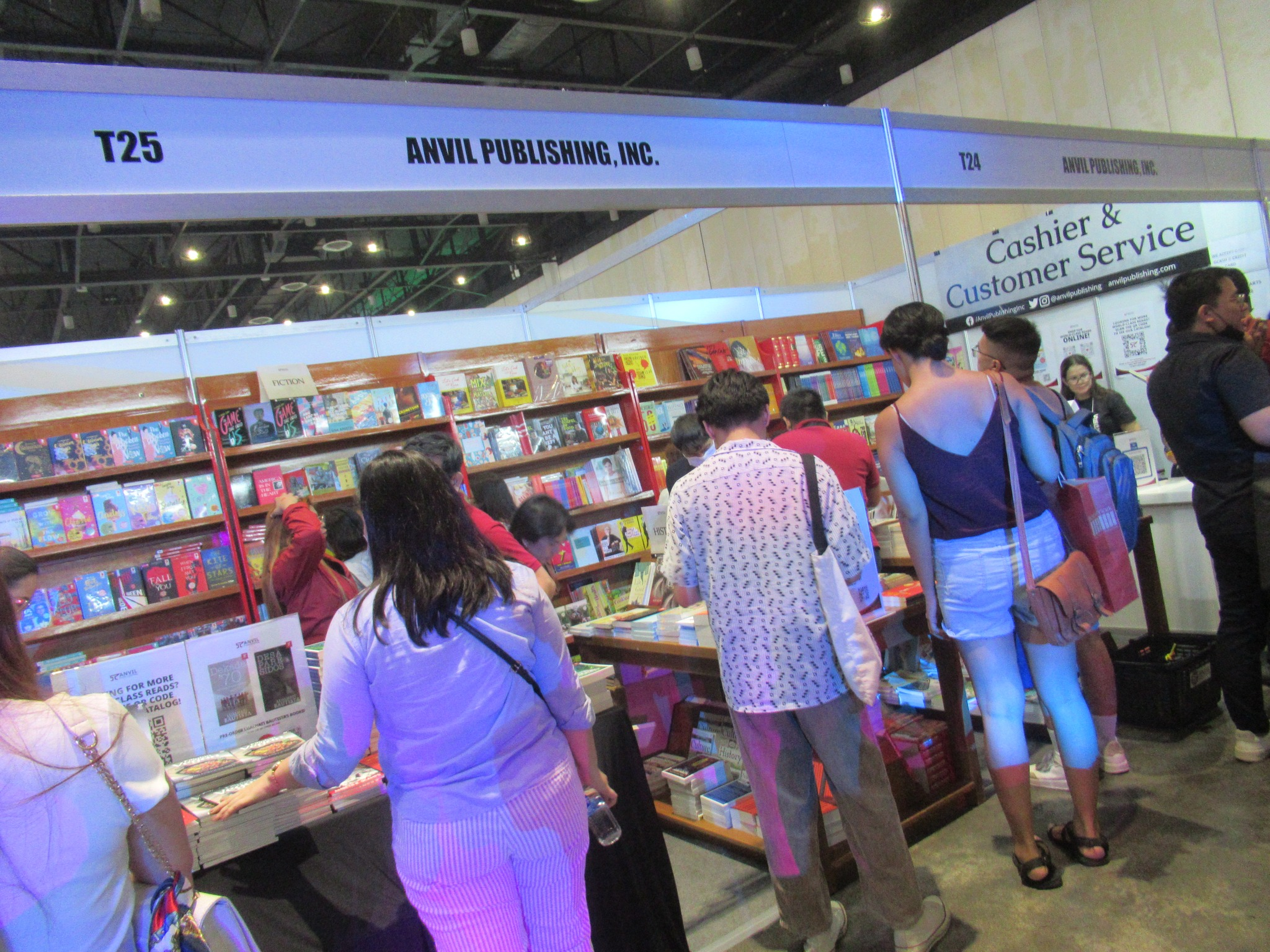
Anvil Publishing at Philippine Book Festival

In 2018, Anvil Publishing, under the imprint Anvil Audio, published its first audiobook titled Dear Universe: Poems on Love, Longing, and Finding Your Place in the Cosmos by Pierra Calasanz-Labrador and narrated by actress Joyce Pring.

== Notable titles ==
- El Filibusterismo. Translated by Almario, Virgilio.
- Noli Me Tangere. Translated by Almario, Virgilio.
- Yuson, Alfred A. Voyeurs & Savages.
- Joaquin, Nick. The Woman Who Had Two Navels.
- Joaquin, Nick. May Day Eve and Other Stories.
- Joaquin, Nick. Tropical Baroque: Four Manileño Theatricals.
- Bulosan, Carlos. America Is in the Heart.

== Notable authors ==
=== Ambeth Ocampo ===
A public historian whose research covers the late nineteenth-century Philippines: its art, culture, and the heroes who figure in the birth of the nation. He writes a widely read editorial page column named "Looking Back" for the Philippine Daily Inquirer and moderates a growing Facebook fan page. Collections of his newspaper columns are anthologized on the Looking Back series of books.

- Looking Back Series
- Rizal Without the Overcoat

=== Lualhati Bautista ===
- Dekada '70
- Bata, Bata... Pa'no Ka Ginawa?
- Desaparesidos.

== See also ==
- Literacy in the Philippines
- Philippine Literature
