= Outstanding Manilan Award =

Annual Filipino award

The Outstanding Manilan Award, also known as the Outstanding Manilan Medallion of Honor, is conferred annually on recipients in fields including business, communications, diplomacy, finance, public service and spiritual leadership. It is given out by the City of Manila. The award was established in 1980.

== Honorees ==
Recipients in 1995 included:

- ambassador Alfonso Yuchengco

Recipients in 1999 included:

- Elmer Jamias of the Philippine National Police

2011 recipients were:

- Father Jose S. Arcilla, SJ
- Director General Raul M. Bacalzo of the Philippine National Police
- CEO Miguel G. Belmonte of the Philippine Star newspaper
- Associate Justice Conchita Carpio-Morales of the Philippine Supreme Court
- CEO Felipe L. Gozon of GMA Network
- Nina Lim-Yuson
- Presiding Justice Andres Reyes Jr. of the Philippine Court of Appeals
- Chairman Andrew L. Tan of Megaworld Corporation
- Ambassador Bienvenido Tantoco Sr.
- Executive Vice President Emilio C. Yap III of the Manila Bulletin newspaper

Recipients in 2014 included:

- entertainer and talent manager German Moreno

2015 recipients were:

- city electrician Lorenzo B. Alconera
- entertainer Vice Ganda
- Senator Robert S. Jaworski
- Associate Justice Carmelita Salandanan Manahan of the Philippine Court of Appeals
- biotechnologist Edgar A. Maranan
- Mercedes S. Pascual of Arranque Market
- environmentalist Robert Y. So
- Senior Deputy City Prosecutor Eufrocina A. Sulla
- playwright Vincent Maniquiz Tañada
- Solar Entertainment chairman William Teng

Recipients in 2016 included:

- Mike Enriquez of Radio GMA Network (RGMA)

2017 recipients were:

- Senator Sonny Angara
- actress Boots Anson-Roa
- architect Juan Arellano
- fashion designer Ben Farrales
- puppeteer Amelia Lapeña-Bonifacio
- landscape sculptor Ramon Orlina
- co-founder Socorro Ramos of the National Book Store
- filmmaker and indigenous people's rights advocate Auraeus Solito
- educator, linguist and writer Patrocinio Villafuerte
