= Cave and Shadows =

Novel by Nick Joaquin

- Book cover for Nick Joaquin's Cave and Shadows.
- Author: Nick Joaquin
- Language: English
- Genre: Fiction
- Publication date: 1983
- Publication place: Philippines

Cave and Shadows is a 1983 whodunit and Martial Law era “metaphysical” thriller novel written by Philippine National Artist Nick Joaquin. The setting of the novel is during Ferdinand Marcos’s martial law in the Philippines, including the time in Manila when activism was alive and demonstrations were frequent before August 1972 (described as Joaquin’s “‘objective correlative’ to the Crisis of ’72”), before the declaration of martial rule. It is a detective fiction that also deals with and arcane and historical cults involving beatas or “beatified women” (a group of religious lay women who were "repressed by a male-dominated, colonial order") and strange events occurring inside unfamiliar caves in the Metro Manila area. Other themes include politics, love, family, friendship, reconciliation, and tyranny. One of two novels authored by Joaquin during his lifetime (written twenty-two years after Joaquin’s The Woman Who Had Two Navels), it is regarded as an important book to read for Philippine literature students. In this work, Joaquin interspersed historical facts and with fiction resulting to a mesh of “multi-layered meanings”. One of the main concept for the plot is the “routinary paganisation” by Filipinos of the Western-rooted religion known as Catholicism.

The bizarre events in this novel includes the inexplicable death of Nenita Coogan. Coogan’s body was found naked inside a cave located within the suburban regions of Manila. The death by Coogan triggered a criminal investigation, truth searching, collision of the past and the present, and the unhinging of reality. The end of the novel exposes human nature, belief, and certainty.
