= Makamisa =

Unfinished novel by José Rizal

- Facsimile of the first page
- Author: José Rizal
- Language: Tagalog and Spanish
- Genre: Novel
- Publisher: Anvil Publishing (first scholarly edition)
- Publication date: 1992
- Publication place: Philippines
- Media type: Manuscript; print

Makamisa (Tagalog for "after Mass") is the conventional title given to an unfinished novel project by Filipino writer and nationalist José Rizal. Written in Tagalog and Spanish in 1891–1892, after the publication of El filibusterismo, it is commonly regarded by scholars as Rizal's third novel. Makamisa was the heading of the opening Tagalog chapter rather than a title definitively assigned by Rizal to the entire work.

Rizal began the project in Tagalog but subsequently started it again in Spanish. Both versions remain incomplete. In 1987, historian Ambeth Ocampo identified the Spanish drafts among a 245-page group of Rizal papers at the National Library of the Philippines. The papers had been catalogued as the Borrador del Noli me Tángere ("Draft of the Noli me Tángere"), causing them to be regarded for decades as material connected with Rizal's first novel.

== Composition and purpose ==
Rizal began writing the novel while living in Hong Kong, where he had settled with members of his family in late 1891. Literary scholar Resil Mojares dates the surviving work to 1891–1892 and connects it with a change in the intended audience of Rizal's writings. Whereas Noli Me Tángere and El filibusterismo were written in Spanish and addressed both Filipino and European readers, Rizal initially intended his third novel to be read directly by Tagalog speakers.

In his correspondence with Ferdinand Blumentritt, Rizal described several objectives for the proposed novel. He wanted to produce a more expressly literary work, reduce the place given to politics, and concentrate on the customs, virtues and faults of the Tagalogs. He planned for ethical questions to occupy the principal role and stated that only two of the main characters—the parish priest and the lieutenant of the Civil Guard—would be Spaniards.

Rizal nevertheless found it difficult to express the project in Tagalog in the form he intended. In a later letter to Blumentritt, he explained that he had abandoned the plan to write the novel in Tagalog and was continuing it in Spanish. Mojares interprets the surviving bilingual manuscript as evidence of Rizal's struggle to reconcile a European literary form with a work addressed to Filipino readers in an indigenous language.

== Manuscripts and publication ==
The surviving material consists of two related but non-identical texts. The shorter manuscript is a handwritten Tagalog opening headed "Makamisa". Rizal then began the narrative again in Spanish, producing a substantially longer group of drafts but leaving these disordered and incomplete. Ocampo reconstructed the Spanish material into a continuous narrative, prepared an English translation, and documented the identification and authentication of the manuscripts.

Ocampo's reconstruction, translations and study were published by Anvil Publishing in 1992 as Makamisa: The Search for Rizal's Third Novel. The volume included transcriptions of Rizal's Tagalog and Spanish texts. Anvil issued a later edition in 2009.

A Filipino translation by Nilo S. Ocampo was published in 1997 under the title Etikang Tagalog: Ang Ikatlong Nobela ni Rizal ("Tagalog Ethics: Rizal's Third Novel").

== Synopsis ==
The surviving narrative is set in a provincial Philippine town immediately after a religious service. Its principal figure is Padre Agatón, an influential parish priest whose unexpected anger during and after Mass causes anxiety among the townspeople. Civil officials and prominent residents attempt to determine what has offended him, and how they can restore his favor.

Names and details differ between the Tagalog and Spanish drafts. The Tagalog fragment names the town as "Tulig" and introduces figures including Kapitan Lucas, Aleng Anday, and Marcela. Ocampo's reconstruction of the longer Spanish drafts is set in a town called "Pili" and includes Capitán Panchong, Capitana Barang, and Cecilia. Padre Agatón remains central to both versions.

Instead of developing toward a completed resolution, the fragments present scenes in the church, the municipal tribunal and the residence of the town's gobernadorcillo. The reactions to Padre Agatón illustrate the parish priest's influence over both the religious and civil affairs of the community. The narrative also employs satire in its portrayal of local officials, religious practices and social relationships.

== Literary interpretation ==
Mojares describes the decision to begin the novel in Tagalog as a "turn to the native": an attempt to address Filipino readers more directly and portray Tagalog society on its own terms. He nevertheless observes that the surviving narrative returns to the provincial setting and clerical conflicts associated with Noli Me Tángere. For Mojares, the unfinished bilingual text illustrates the continuing problem of language in the formation of a Philippine national literature.

Antonio Huertas Morales similarly identifies Makamisa as Rizal's third novel and notes that it was initially conceived as a Tagalog work for Tagalog readers, with greater emphasis on literary artistry. He characterizes the project as a movement back toward the social world of the Noli, rather than a further development of the darker political narrative of El filibusterismo.

Ocampo's identification of the Spanish manuscripts also changed the earlier attribution of the status of Rizal's third novel to another unfinished work, sometimes called the "Tagalog Nobility". Subsequent literary studies have generally treated the Tagalog and Spanish Makamisa manuscripts as the surviving portions of the third-novel project described in Rizal's letters.

== Adaptations ==
Anril Pineda Tiatco freely adapted the unfinished novel into the two-act Filipino play Cuaresma: Isang Dulang Ganap ang Haba. Published by the University of Santo Tomas Publishing House in 2013, the play used Ocampo's annotations and reimagined Rizal's characters in a story about political dynasties, the involvement of the Church in civil affairs and concealed family conflicts.

Filmmaker Khavn De La Cruz used the novel as the basis of the experimental film Rizal's Makamisa: Phantasma ng Higanti (Makamisa: Phantasm of Revenge). The 73-minute Philippine–German production had its world premiere in the international competition of the 2024 FIDMarseille film festival. It was described by the festival as a free adaptation rather than an attempt to supply a definitive ending to Rizal's manuscripts.

== See also ==
- Noli Me Tángere
- El filibusterismo
- Philippine literature
- Literature in Spanish
