= Nick Joaquin =

Filipino writer and journalist (1917–2004)

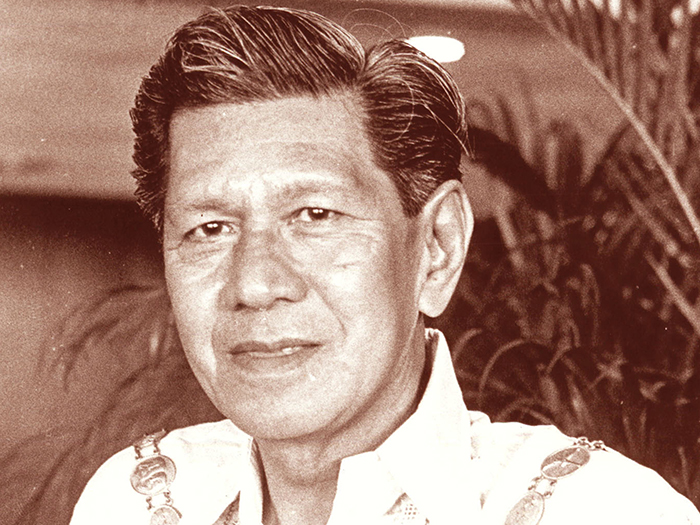
- Portrait of Joaquin
- Born: Nicomedes Joaquin y Marquez; May 4, 1917; Paco, Manila
- Died: April 29, 2004 (aged 86); San Juan, Metro Manila
- Resting place: Libingan ng mga Bayani; Loyola Memorial Park
- Occupations: Journalist; playwright; novelist
- Awards: Order of National Artists of the Philippines

Nicomedes "Nick" Marquez Joaquin (Tagalog: [hwaˈkin]; May 4, 1917 – April 29, 2004) was a Filipino writer and journalist best known for his short stories and novels in the English language. He also wrote using the pen name Quijano de Manila. Joaquin was conferred the rank and title of National Artist of the Philippines for Literature. He has been considered one of the most important Filipino writers, along with José Rizal and Claro M. Recto. Unlike Rizal and Recto, whose works were written in Spanish, Joaquin's major works were written in English despite being literate in Spanish.

== Biography ==
=== Early life and family ===
Nicomedes "Nick" Joaquin y Marquez, fondly called "Onching" by close family and friends was born on May 4, 1917, in Paco, Manila. There are varying accounts on the date of his birth, some cite it as September 15, 1917. This could stem from how Joaquin himself refrained from revealing his date of birth because he disliked the fuss of people coming over and celebrating his birthday.

Joaquin was the fifth out of the ten children of Don Leocadio Joaquin and Salomé Marquez. Don Leocadio fought in the Philippine Revolution by the side of his friend General Emilio Aguinaldo, and reached the position of Colonel. He retired after he was wounded in action and moved on to a prolific career as a lawyer in Manila and the southern province of Laguna. Salomé Marquez was a well-educated woman who taught at a Manila public school. She was trained by Americans in English to teach at the public schools when the United States colonized the Philippines.

The Joaquin family lived in a two-story residential and commercial building, greatly uncommon at that time, on Herran Street (now Pedro Gil Street) in Paco, Manila. Joaquin was said to have had an extremely happy childhood. The Joaquin children were tutored in Spanish & piano, and were encouraged to have an interest in the arts. The Joaquin household communicated in Spanish and heard mass regularly. Joaquin was a notably devout Christian and continued being so his whole life.

The Joaquins had lived a handsome life until Don Leocadio lost the family fortune in a failed investment on an oil exploration project in the late 1920s. The family moved out of their Herran home and into a rented house in Pasay. Don Leocadio passed not long after. The young Joaquin was only twelve years old and this signalled a big change in their family.

=== Education ===
Nick Joaquin attended Paco Elementary School and went to Mapa High School for secondary education. However, in his third year he informed his mother that he wanted to drop out because he felt that the classroom was too confined for him and that he learned more outside of it.[3] His mother Salomé, a former teacher, was devastated by the news, but still allowed him to do so.

After leaving school, Joaquin worked as an apprentice in a bakery in Pasay and later on in the publishing company TVT (Tribune-Vanguardia-Taliba.)[4] This allowed him a small taste of an industry he would spend most of his life in.

An avid reader, Joaquin, used this time to pursue his passion for it. He was described as having a "rabid and insane love for books" by his sister-in-law Sarah K. Joaquin. His parents had encouraged his interest in books early on. He already had a borrower's card at the National Library when he was ten. He purveyed his father's personal library and loved the bookstores in downtown Manila. He read voraciously and intently, he read everything that had caught his eye. He enjoyed the "poetry of Edna St. Vincent Millay and Vachel Lindsay to the stories of Anton Chekhov, to the novels of Dostoyevsky, D. H. Lawrence, and Willa Cather. He read American magazines (Saturday Evening Post, Cosmopolitan, Harper’s Magazine) and discovered the fiction of Booth Tarkington, Somerset Maugham, F. Scott Fitzgerald, and Ernest Hemingway."[4]

=== Career beginnings ===
Very early on, Joaquin was already exploring his literary voice. At age 17, he published his first English poem about Don Quixote, in the literary section of the pre-World War II Tribune, where he worked as a proofreader. It was accepted by the writer and editor Serafin Lanot. Joaquin had felt a strong connection with the story of Don Quixote; he felt like he could identify with the character. Later in life, he used a similar iteration of Quixote in his various pen names, Quijano de Pacó and Quijano de Manila.

A little later, in 1937 he published his first short story in the Sunday Tribune Magazine, "The Sorrows of Vaudeville" telling the story of the vaudevilles in Manila—a city he was endlessly enamored by. It was accepted by the writer and editor Serafin Lanot.

After Joaquin won a nationwide essay competition to honor La Naval de Manila, sponsored by the Dominican Order, the University of Santo Tomas awarded him an honorary Associate in Arts (A.A.) and a scholarship to St. Albert's Convent, the Dominican monastery in Hong Kong. There he was once again close to his family's original goal for him to enter the seminary. Joaquin and his family were devoutly Christian. He notably heard mass daily and was fond of praying the Holy Rosary. He only stayed in Hong Kong for two years before returning to Manila.

Joaquin continued publishing stories and poems between 1934 and 1941 in the Herald Mid-Week Magazine and the Sunday Tribune Magazine. The Commonwealth years were a particularly vibrant era in Philippine literature. Later, the Japanese occupation closed down the Tribune and other publications. The young Joaquin had to look for ways to support his family.

Throughout the occupation, Joaquin had continued writing. "The Woman Who Felt Like Lazarus" and the essay "La Naval de Manila" were borne out of this war period Joaquin had detested. His work had appeared in the Philippine Review, an English-language journal, in 1943. His story, "It Was Later Than We Thought" and his translation of Rizal's Mi Ultimo Adios were also published. He was beginning to spark an interest from readers. However, the reticent Joaquin shied away from recognition. He had created this mysterious and distant author.

=== Career ===
After returning to the Philippines, Joaquin joined the Philippines Free Press, starting as a proofreader. He soon attracted notice for his poems, stories and plays, as well as his journalism under the pen name Quijano de Manila. His journalism was both intellectual and provocative, an unknown genre in the Philippines at that time, and raised the country's level of reportage.

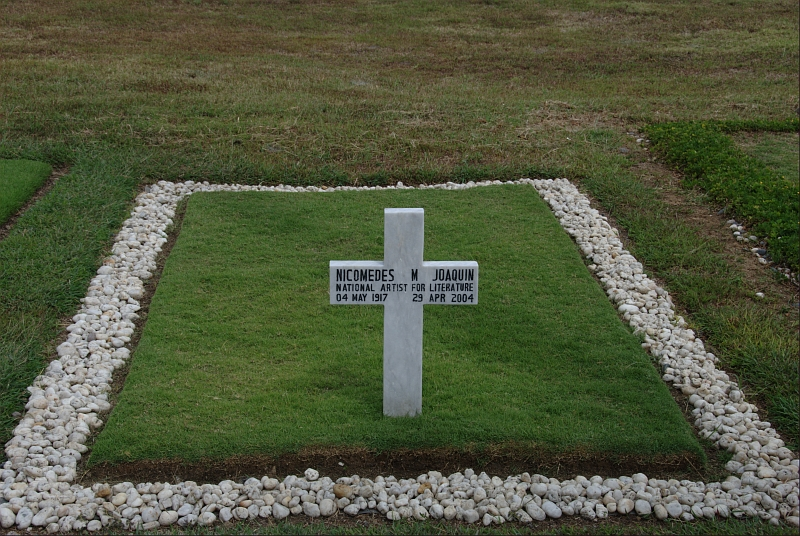
Part of Nick Joaquin's cremains were interred at the Libingan ng mga Bayani.

Joaquin deeply admired José Rizal, the national hero of the Philippines, paying him tribute in such books as The Storyteller's New Medium – Rizal in Saga, The Complete Poems and Plays of Jose Rizal, and A Question of Heroes: Essays in Criticism on Ten Key Figures of Philippine History. He translated the hero's valedictory poem, in the original Spanish Mi Ultimo Adios, as "Land That I Love, Farewell!".^{[5]}

Joaquin represented the Philippines at the International PEN Congress in Tokyo in 1957, and was appointed as a member of the Motion Pictures commission under presidents Diosdado Macapagal and Ferdinand E. Marcos.^{[5]}

After being honored as National Artist, Joaquin used his position to work for intellectual freedom in society. He secured the release of imprisoned writer José F. Lacaba. At a ceremony on Mount Makiling attended by First Lady Imelda Marcos, Joaquin delivered an invocation to Maria Makiling a diwata and the mountain's mythical maiden. Joaquin touched on the importance of freedom and the artist. After that, Joaquin was excluded by the Marcos regime as a speaker at important cultural events.^{[5]}

Joaquin died of cardiac arrest in the early morning of April 29, 2004, at his home in San Juan, Metro Manila. He was then editor of Philippine Graphic magazine, where he worked with Juan P. Dayang, the magazine's first publisher. Joaquin was also publisher of its sister publication, Mirror Weekly, a women's magazine, and wrote the column "Small Beer" for the Philippine Daily Inquirer and Isyu, an opinion tabloid.^{[5]}

== Works ==
=== Novels ===
- The Woman Who had Two Navels (1961)
- Cave and Shadows (1983)

=== Notable Short Stories ===
- The Sorrows of Vaudeville (1937)
- Three Generations (1940)
- The Mass of St. Sylvester (1946)
- May Day Eve (1947)
- The Summer Solstice (1945)
- The Legend of the Virgin's Jewel (1952)
- Cándido's Apocalypse (1965)
- The Order of Melchizedek (1966)

=== Notable Poetry ===
- To a Locker and a Lost Pack of Camels (1936)
- The Innocence of Solomon (1938)
- Stubbs Road Cantos
- Two Kisses of Eros
- Six P.M.

=== Notable Articles and Essays ===
- La Naval de Manila (1943)
- The Novels of Rizal: An Appreciation (1956)
- The House on Zapote Street: The Curious Drama Behind the Massacre Last Week in Makati (1961)
- Notes on the Menu: Our Cuisine is Perhaps the Part of Our Culture Where the Borrowed and the Native have the Most Happily Blended (1962)
- A Heritage in Smallness (1966)
- Walastik! Walandyo! (1966)
- Golden Girl: How the Lowly Morenita from Iriga Rose to Become the Superstar Nora Aunor (1966)
- Journalism versus Literature? (1996)

=== Lyrics ===
- Far Eastern University Hymn

=== Plays ===
- A Portrait of the Artist as Filipino (1966)
- Tropical Baroque: Four Manileño Theatricals (1982):
  - Tatarin: A Witches' Sabbath in Three Acts
  - Fathers and Sons: A Melodrama in Three Reels
  - The Beatas: A Hymn in Three Stanzas

=== Screenplays ===
- Bagong Umaga (1952)
- Siglo Filipino : Odyssey of a Nation (2001)

=== Children's stories ===
- Pop Stories for Groovy Kids Series (1979):
  - The Amazing History of Elang Uling
  - The Happiest Boy in the World
  - The Adventures of Culas-Culasito
  - The Four Little Monkeys Who Went to Eden
  - Going to Jerusalem
  - Johnny Tiñoso and the Proud Beauty
  - Lilit Bulilit and the Babe in the Womb
  - The Hamiling Mistery
  - How Love Came to Juan Tamad
  - Sarimanok vc. Ibong Adarna

=== Collection of Poetry and Short Stories ===
- Prose and Poems (1952)
- Tropical Gothic (1972)
- Joaquinesquerie: Myth A La Mod (1983)
- Collected Verse (1987)
- Gotita de Dragon and Other Stories (2014)

=== Collection of Essays ===
- La Naval de Manila and Other Essays (1964)
- Joseph Estrada and Other Sketches (1977)
- Nora Aunor & Other Profiles (1977)
- Ronnie Poe & Other Silhouettes (1977)
- Reportage on Lovers (1977)
- Reportage on Crime (1977)
- Amalia Fuentes & Other Etchings (1977)
- Gloria Diaz & Other Delineations (1977)
- Doveglion & Other Cameos (1977)
- Language of the Streets and Other Essays (1977)
- Manila: Sin City and Other Chronicles (1977)
- Reportage on the Marcoses (1979)
- Language of the Street and Other Essays (1980)
- Reportage on Politics (1981)
- Discourses of the Devil's Advocate and Other Controversies (1983)

=== Writings on History, Culture, and Biography ===
- A Question of Heroes: Essays in Criticism on Ten Key Figures of Philippine History (1977)
- Super Sales Girl: The Nanay Behind the Miracle of a Firm (1977)
- Almanac for Manileños (1979)
- The Seven Ages of Romulo (1979)
- The Ballad of the Five Battles (1981)
- The Seven Golden Cities of the Sun (1981)
- The Aquinos of Tarlac: An Essay on History as Three Generations (1983)
- Doy Laurel in Profile: A Philippine Political Odyssey (1985)
- The Quartet of the Tiger Moon: Scenes from the People Power Apocalypse (1986)
- Antonio L. Cabangon Chua: A Saga of Success (1986)
- The World of Rafael Salas: Service and Management in the Global Village (1987)
- Culture and History: Occasional Notes on the Process of Philippine Becoming (1988)
- Mr. Rural Reform: The Times and Tidings of Manny Manahan (1990)
- Manila, My Manila: A History for the Young (1990)
- San Miguel de Manila: Memoirs of a Regal Parish (1990)
- Nineteenth Century Manila: The World of Damian Domingo (co-authored with Luciano P. R. Santiago, 1990)
- Jaime Ongpin, The Enigma: A Profile of the Filipino as Manager (1990)
- The Book of Sin: From Golden Salakot to Red Hat (1992)
- The PC and EDSA: A Paean to the Peers of ‘86 (1992)
- The D.M. Guevara Story (1993)
- Tatang: The Life Story of Celestino M. Dizon (1994)
- La Orosa: The Dance-Drama that is Leonor Goquingco (1994)
- Mr. F.E.U., the Culture Hero That Was Nicanor Reyes (1995)
- Rizal in Saga: A Life for Student Fans (1996)
- One Woman's Liberating: The Life and Career of Estefania Aldaba-Lim (1996)
- Hers, This Grove: The Story of Philippine Women's University (1996)
- May Langit Din Ang Mahirap: The Life Story of Alfredo Siojo Lim (1998)
- Dakila F. Castro, Barrister: His Life and Time in Litigation (1999)
- Madame Excelsis: Historying Gloria Macapagal-Arroyo (2002)
- Palacio de Malacañang 200 Years of a Ruling House (2002)
- A Kadre's Road to Damascus: The Ruben Torres Story (2003)
- To Leave a Good Name: The Legacy of Alfonso T. Yuchengco (2005)
- Ed Angara: Seer of Sea & Sierra (2006)
- ABE: A Frank Sketch of E. Aguilar Cruz (2006)
- ACCRA and the Post-Bellum Bar (2015)
- BOMBAY! A True-Blue Filipino: Ramon D. Bagatsing, The Longest-serving Mayor of the City of Manila, 1971 to 1986 (2026)

=== Works of Translation ===
- Martin de Porres, A Colored Saint: Biographical Sketches (1962) – An English translation of San Martín de Porres: Estampas biográficas by Vicente Galduf Blasco, O.P.
- Sun Yat-sen: The Founder of the Republic of China (1965) – An English translation from the original Spanish written by Mariano Ponce
- The Complete Poems and Plays of Jose Rizal (1976)
- The Recto Valedictory (1985) – Translation from Spanish of the last ten speeches Claro M. Recto was set to deliver in Spain had he not died unexpectedly in Rome on October 2, 1960.
- A Spaniard in Aguinaldo's army: The Military Journal of Telesforo Carrasco y Perez (1986)
- Spiritual Register: The News Columns of Teodoro M. Kalaw in La Vanguardia, 1926-1927 (2001)

== Themes & motifs ==
In a critical study of his prose and poems, the subjects depicted his nostalgia for the past, church rituals, legends, the mysterious, the different shades of evil, the power of the basic emotions over culture, the freedom of the will against fate, the mutability of the human body compared to the spirit, and the like. They are often set in old Manila, the walled city of Intramuros, and sometimes Paco – as a symbol of congruence, the glory and culture of the past, rather than a geographical concept. His characters are mostly cultured intellectuals of past generations, while the opposing characters are usually from the materialistic modern age. Unless they are portrayed to adjust better than old men, women seldom have significant roles in this cultured world of the past.

=== Theology of culture ===
Critics of Nick Joaquin's works mention the presence of theological dimensions in his writings. These critics, such as Lumbera, referred to Nick Joaquin as the most stimulating lay theologian, 1968. Such examples of works containing theological dimensions include ""Doña Jeronima", "The Legend of the Dying Wanton" and "The Mass of St. Sylvestre" whose themes are said to be drawn from Spanish traditions. Stories from Tropical Goth, although not as obvious according to critics, possessed a Christian background but there were arguments made that what is Christian is not necessarily theological. Different analysis of Nick Joaquin's works on these stories found in Tropical Goth reveal the use of primordial and pagan symbols. There is a fixation towards brute and the cult. Critics mention that while there are theological levels present in these stories, these were more at the folk level than dogmatic and were more reflective rather than perspective. These were then referred to as reflections of the theology of culture.^{[9]}

=== Ethical aspects ===
Different Analysis of Nick Joaquin's work, mainly "The Woman Who Had Two Navels" and stories from "Tropical Gothic", have led critics to mention the theme of individual free will as seen in the emphasis of choice and free will in the mentioned stories. This is found, in what critics refer to, as Joaquin's level of morality which they mention as what makes his stories expressively theological.^{[9]}

=== History or time ===
A theological theme revealed in the Early Joaquin works is the emphasis on history and time. These are evident, according to critics, in works such as "May Day Eve". "Guardia de Honor", and "The Order of Melchizedek" and while not as obvious, were present as thematic backgrounds in "Doña Jeronima", "The Legend of the Dying Wanton", "The Summer Solstice", and "The Mass of St. Sylvestre". This theme comes in the form of fixation with time and patterns of recurrence as described by critics as nostalgia, which is said to show emphasis on the past. Critics make a connection of this theological reality used by Nick Joaquin to reflect Philippine culture and the intermingling of Christian and pagan values.^{[9]}

=== Rejection of colonial self ===
According to critics, Nick Joaquin is said to be a writer who sees the essence of being Filipino in the return to the Filipino's pre-Hispanic past. National identity is a very important topic for Nick Joaquin as evident in his works such as La Naval de Manila, After the Picnic and Summer Solstice. Noticeably in his works namely After the Picnic and Summer Solstice, the recurring theme of the rejection of the colonial self can be seen in the conflicts of the protagonist such as Chedeng, from After the Picnic, to reject Father Chavez's white-ego-ideals. In Chedeng's attempt to assert one's identity through rejection of the colonial self-imposed by society, she is confronted into choosing whether she would obliged with the white-ego ideal which asserts her security or rejection of the white-ego-ideal. Nick Joaquin also, every now and then, motleys this theme with other themes such as gender conflict, which can be evident in After the Picnic and Summer Solstice. A good example of Nick Joaquin's blending of themes is Summer Solstice, wherein he conflates gender conflict with colonial conflict, noticeable in the assertion of Doña Lupeng in the reclamation of the power of patriarchy by womanhood.

=== Recognition of Spanish contributions ===
Yet, Nick Joaquin also recognized the significance of Spanish contribution in the Philippines. Commenting on the Manila Galleon, Joaquin writes:

"It was the Manila Galleon that brought the guitar to the kanto-boy, the caserola to the housewife, hammer and saw to the carpenter, hoe and spade to the farmer, easel and brush to the artist, the compass to the seaman, the clock to the office worker, Virgil and Cervantes to the scholar, and shoes to the man on the street. Epochal enough was the transfer of Western flora and fauna to the Philippines. Even more epochal was the transfer here of Western technology, with the galleons serving, literally, as vessels and media. What Philippine culture owes the Manila Galleon is incalculable. Even that badge of nationalism, the barong tagalog, may have come over on those boats. Think of anything supremely Pinoy—guava or camote or sili or sibuyas verde—and you find they were given to us by the galleons."

As is evident from these passages, Joaquin did not see the Spanish occupation to be completely malevolent in nature, but rather brought some beneficial things in the nation, such as the development of national culture. On those who say that the Philippines was already advanced in trading with other cultures, Joaquin writes:

"There are those that argue that, even before the Galleon Trade, Manila was already a busy trader with China, India, Japan and the Malay world. If that be true, then the folk of Soliman's Maynila should have impressed the Spanish with their knowledge of Confucianism, of Taoism, of Hinduism, or Buddhism, or Shintoism. All the early Kastila noticed was that those Manileños knew very little even about Islam."

Nick Joaquin argues that, "It was on the Manila Galleon that we began to become the Philippines." He, also writes about the war of Spain against the Dutch in the 17th century:

"In the 1890s we were fighting for nationhood. But during the first half of the 17th century we (Filipinos) were fighting for existence itself. We were fighting to stay an entity. We were fighting to keep an independent entity. That is something we dd not know then and it's something we still mostly ignore. Our historians now say that the foreign war that Filipinos were made to fight, and for which they hewed timber, built ships, and gathered provisions, were of no concern to us and therefore not Philippine history. But if, for the war against the Dutch, we had not hewed timber, built ships, gathered provisions and fought, there might have been no Philippine history at all. If Holland had won that war, we would have become part of the Dutch East Indies. And we might today be an Indonesian province."

== Criticism ==
=== Early Nick Joaquin ===
Tropical Gothic was reviewed in Philippine studies by H.B. Furay, Lourdes Busuego Pabo, and Emmanuel Lacaba. Critics describe this as the end of what they refer to as the Early Joaquin.

Attempting to characterize stories of Tropic Goth as what critics referred to as a product of the Early Nick Joaquin would be deceptive for it was written, along with majority of his works, during the thirties. Critics referred to the publication years of 1946 -1966 as most significant in terms of the works produced. They also referred to these years as the time wherein Nick Joaquin was recognized as a first rank writer in the Philippines. Works included in these years include "Prose and Poems" (1952), three stories in the "Free Press" (1965 - 1966) and The portrait of the Artist as a Filipino. Included in the first edition of Nick Joaquin's "Prose and Poems" were the titles "The Woman Who had Two Navels" (1961) and "La Naval de Manila" (1964).

Emmanuel Lacaba, member of Philippine Studies, argues that the three Free Press Stories known as "Candido’s Apocalypse", ""Doña Jeronima", and "The Order of Melchizedek", were considered works under the older Nick Joaquin given the gap between these works and the earlier stories of "Prose and Poems". Despite the gap, Lacaba argues that there is a recurring theme present in the later works of Nick Joaquin. In Emmanuel Lacaba's criticism, he mentions the radical change in language, mainly through the dialogue used. Early Nick Joaquin, as Lacaba described through the example of Tropical Goth, made use of "lush" language as well as "baroque" once the readers get past the words used. Similar cases for "Candido’s Apocalypse" and "The Order of Melchizedek" which show more similarities than differences in the way of sentence patterns used.^{[9]}

Critics, such as Furay, define Early Nick Joaquin through his nine stories of Tropic Gothic which emphasizes his talents in Philippine writing in English. Additionally, through the mention of works such as "Prose and Poems" (1952) and the three additional "Free Press stories" (1972), critics argue that the greatness of his writing lies in his themes used as well as deep intellectual analysis of Philippine culture embedded in his writing style.^{[9]}

=== Late Nick Joaquin ===
The Late Nick Joaquin is defined by critics as the time 10 years after his absence from the field of fiction. These years, as defined by Lacaba, were about Joaquin devoting himself entirely to Free Press and journalistic writing. This was defined by Joaquin the essayist. He wrote under the pseudonym of Quijano de Manila. The beginning of Late Joaquin was seen after he had published two significant essays and three plays after 1975. Publications of Late Joaquin still deal with similar themes of history, paganism and Christianity and morality. His published article, The Manila Review on "Culture of History" represent his philosophy of the past which underlies many of his early works. Critics emphasizes that in the later works, there is a sharper emphasis on freedom and choice as seen in his publication in December 1975 titled "Fathers and Sons: A Melodrama in Three Reels" which was a dramatization of his earlier story "Three Generations".^{[9]}

== Legacy ==
=== Contribution to English Letters ===
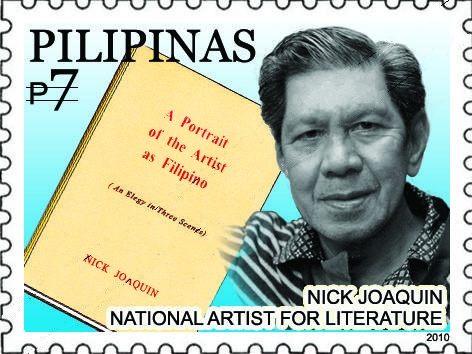
Nick Joaquin on a 2010 stamp of the Philippines

Nick Joaquin's name as a literary artist is considered, by different university professors, as a key figure in Philippine literature in English due to the imparted truths of his writing. In his different works, Nick Joaquin has presented objective realities about different events and people capturing both their good and bad qualities^{[5]}. In his essays, Nick Joaquin is said to employ real life situations through symbolic qualities reflecting certain social and cultural values. This is done through the subject selection and form of writing chosen which are considered by many different fellow artists as unique.^{[5]} In terms of the development of the English language, Nick Joaquin was able to contribute to this by adding Filipino feelings, values, and nuances. Literary writers have mentioned how he was able to preserve the culture of the Filipinos through the use of a different tongue. The English language used by Nick Joaquin became a medium to express his literary artistry and Filipino Patriotism. Nick Joaquin was able to publish a large body of literary works during his time and through this, he has had great contribution to Philippine literature in English.^{[5]}

=== Contribution to Literary Journalism ===
Nick Joaquin's foray into literary journalism involved bringing together his two careers. Joaquin argued that Philippine letters during the 1950s and 1960s were polarized into extremes: literature and journalism. Joaquin, under the name of Quijano de Manila during that time, belonged to both worlds as found in his works. According to different studies on literary journalism, works of Nick Joaquin serve as examples of social sciences applied to the arts^{[10]}. This was further seen in his work "Philippine letters’ Dr Jekyll and Mr Hyde which, according to scholars, showed de Manila's career which oscillates between fiction and non-fiction^{[10]}. It was during 1960 wherein Nick Joaquin entered journalism from being a fiction writer. It was under the name of de Manila wherein he began to publish reportage in a literary journalistic style. This was then referred to as, he claimed, "New Journalism" in the United States according to the Philippine Daily Inquirer.^{[11]} Different literary scholars claim that the works of Nick Joaquin as de Manila exemplifies what he quotes as "good reportage with grace of style". One of de Manila's publication, "The House on Zapote Street", was termed journalism by the author but is read much like his fictional works under the name Nick Joaquin.^{[11]}

=== Film Adaptations ===
- A Portrait of the Artist as Filipino (1965), is a film produced by Manuel de Leon and directed by National Artist for Film Lamberto V. Avellana. Adapted from Joaquin's original play of the same title, the film used the shortened script used by Barangay Theater Guild (BGT) which was wriiten and edited by Avellana and his wife, National Artist for Theater Daisy Hontiveros-Avellana. The cinematography was by Mike Accion, music was by Miguel Velarde. Cast included Daisy Hontiveros-Avellana as Candida, Naty Crame-Rogers as Paula, Vic Silayan as Bitoy Camacho, Conrad Parham as Tony Javier
- Jaguar (1979), is a Film Noir directed by Lino Brocka with the screenplay written by Jose F. Lacaba and Ricardo Lee. The plot was inspired by Nick Joaquin's 1960 article "The Boy Who Wanted to Become Society" later republished in the non-fiction crime anthology, Reportage on Crime (1977).
- Kisapmata, is a 1981 psychological horror film directed by Mike De Leon, written for the screen by De Leon, Clodualdo del Mundo Jr., and Raquel Villavicencio. The plot was inspired by Nick Joaquin's 1961 article "The House on Zapote Street" later republished in the non-fiction crime anthology, Reportage on Crime (1977).
- Johnny Tinoso and the Proud Beauty (1993) is a film produced by Seiko Films and directed by Mario O'Hara and National Artist for Theater Tony Mabesa. The film is based on a children's story of the same title.
- Tatarin (2001), a movie based on Joaquin's short story "The Summer Solstice", was directed by Amable "Tikoy" Aguiluz. The screenplay was written by Ricardo Lee. Joaquin was consulted on the film. The cast included notable Filipino actors Edu Manzano (as Paeng Moreta,) Dina Bonnevie (Lupe Moreta), Rica Peralejo (Amada), and Raymond B. Bagatsing.
- Dahling Nick (2015), is a docudrama directed by Sari Lluch Dalena which was an entry for the 2015 Cinema One Originals. It is a documentary focusing on the life and works of Joaquin. This includes a dramatization of his works Legend of the Virgin's Jewel, May Day Eve, and Two Kisses of Eros. It also featured reading of passages from Stubbs Road Cantos, The Summer Solstice, The Innocence of Solomon, and Six P.M. by Joaquin's friends and contemporaries.
- Ang Larawan (2017), which won the best picture award in the 2017 Metro Manila Film Festival. It is a screen adaptation of Joaquin's A Portrait of the Artist as Filipino. It was translated to Filipino and written as a libretto by Rolando Tinio. The music was set by Ryan Cayabyab.
- Filipina filmmaker Isabel Sandoval is currently working on the film inspired by the sensibilities of Nick Joaquin's 1972 short story collection, Tropical Gothic.

== Recognitions ==
Critics noted that Joaquin's literary prominence rests upon his book Prose and Poems. Published in 1952, it contains his most renowned short stories "Three Generations", "May Day Eve", "After the Picnic", "The Legend of the Dying Wanton", "The Legend of the Virgin Jewel", and "It Was Later than we Thought". Editor Seymour Laurence and poet José García Villa lauded "Three Generations" as "a short story masterpiece" (1952). It was also selected as the best short story published in the Philippines Free Press between March 1943 and November 1944.

Joaquin received several honors and distinctions in the fields of literature and journalism. In 1973, his collection of poems and short stories won the SEATO Literary Award. In 1976, he was conferred the title of National Artist in Literature, the highest state honor given to individuals for their contributions to Philippine literature, and an award that Joaquin agreed to accept on the condition that the then authoritarian leader Ferdinand Marcos release the writer and political prisoner Pete Lacaba. As a member of the Philippine Free Press staff, Joaquin published weekly articles under his journalistic pseudonym Quijano de Manila. In 1996, he was chosen Journalist of the Year at the 11th National Press Club-Esso Journalism Awards. His nominator, the Philippines Free Press editor Teodoro Locsin, remarked that Joaquin's work had raised journalism to the level of literature. His other recognitions are the following:

- José Garcia Villa's Honor Roll (1940)
- Philippines Free Press Short Story Contest (1949)
- Ten Most Outstanding Young Men of the Philippines (TOYM), Awardee for Literature (1955)
- Don Carlos Palanca Memorial Literary Awards (1957–1958; 1965; 1976)
- Harper Publishing Company (New York, U.S.) writing fellowship
- Stonehill Award for the Novel (1960)
- Republic Cultural Heritage Award (1961)
- Patnubay ng Sining at Kalinangan Award from the City of Manila (1964)
- National Artist Award (March 27, 1976).
- S.E.A. Write Award (1980)
- Ramon Magsaysay Award for Literature (1996)
- Tanglaw ng Lahi Award from the Ateneo de Manila University (1997)
- Several ESSO Journalism awards, including the highly covetedJournalist of the Year Award.
- Several National Book Awards from the Manila Critics' Circle for The Aquinos of Tarlac: An Essay in History as Three Generations; The Quartet of the Tiger Moon: Scenes from the People Power Apocalypse; Culture and History: Occasional Notes on the Process of Philippine Becoming; The World of Damian Domingo: 19th Century Manila (co-authored with Luciano P.R. Santiago); and Jaime Ongpin: The Enigma: The Profile of a Filipino as Manager.
- His work "Three Generations" was awarded Best Short Story published in the Philippine Review (March 1943-November 1944)
- Journalist of the Year in the 11th National Press Club-Esso Journalism Awards (1966)
- Won the Seato Literary Award Contest for his collection of short stories and poems (June 1, 1973)

== See also ==
- José Rizal
- National Artists of the Philippines
