= May Day Eve =

Short story by Nick Joaquin

"May Day Eve" is a story written by Filipino National Artist Nick Joaquin. Written after World War II, it became one of Joaquin's “signature stories” that became a classic in Philippine literature in English. Together with Joaquin's other stories like The Mass of St. Sylvester, Doña Jeronima and Candido’s Apocalypse, May Day Eve utilized the theme of "magic realism" long before the genre was made a trend in Latin American novels. Published in 1947, it is a story originally intended for adult readers, but has later become a required and important reading material for Filipino students.

== Character description ==
The major characters in May Day Eve are Badoy, Agueda, Anastasia, Warren, Agueda's daughter, and Voltaire Badoy's Grandson. Agueda and Badoy have different personalities. Agueda was described to be a bold, liberated, and a non-conformist young woman who was “ahead of her time”. While Badoy was characterized in the beginning as a promiscuous young man who wanted to prove his machismo, he realized that he was “deliriously in love” with Agueda.

== Plot summary ==
As soon as Don Badoy Montiya comes home to his old home at Intramuros, Manila late at night he finds his grandson chanting an old spell in front of a mirror, memories of his youth came back. He recalled how he fell in love with Agueda, a young woman who resisted his advances. Agueda learned that she would be able to know her future husband by reciting an incantation in front of a mirror. As she recited the words: “Mirror, mirror, show to me him whose woman I will be,” Badoy saw Agueda. Badoy and Agueda got married. Don Badoy told his grandson that every time he looks at the mirror, he only sees a "witch"(Agueda). However, Don Badoy learned from his grandson that he was described by Doña Agueda (through their daughter) as a "devil" when she originally performed the same ritual. Don Badoy ponders on love that had dissipated. The truth was revealed, Badoy and Agueda had a “bitter marriage”, which began in the past, during one evening in the month of May in 1847. The tragedy of the story is Badoy’s heart forgot how he loved Agueda in the past. They were not able to mend their broken marriage because their love was a “raging passion and nothing more”.

== Adaptations ==
The short story had been adapted as an opera by a group of actors and actresses from the College of Music of the University of the Philippines. The Tanghalang Ateneo of the Ateneo de Manila University, under the direction of Alberto S. Florentino, also adapted Joaquin's May Day Eve into a play, which was described as a "tragic tale of love found and love forgotten" and "disillusionment" set in a Philippine patriarchal society during the 19th century. The stage version was performed in English and later in Filipino. The latter was based on the translation done by Jerry Respeto.
