= The Summer Solstice =

Short story by Nick Joaquin

"The Summer Solstice", also known as "Tatarin" or "Tadtarin", is a short story written by Filipino National Artist for Literature Nick Joaquin. In addition to being regarded as one of Joaquin's most acclaimed literary works, the tale is considered to be controversial. The story narrates a ritual performed by women to invoke the gods to grant the blessing of fertility by dancing around a Balete tree that was already a century old. Joaquin later turned this short story into a play entitled Tatarin: A Witches' Sabbath in Three Acts, on which a film adaptation has been based.

== Overview ==
Tatarin, also sometimes spelled Tadtarin, was a three-day traditional fertility ritual involving women and held during summer in the Philippines. The last day of the festival coincided with St. John's Day; a Catholic feast. Men dressed as women were able to participate in the pagan celebration. It is similar to the fertility rites of Obando, Bulacan.

Apart from being considered as Joaquin's personal favorite, The Summer Solstice was also one of the most anthologized. Although popular, it was also regarded controversial due to conflicting interpretations about the masterpiece. Filipino literary critics had debated over the ending of the story, questioning what was victorious in the narrative. The items in conflict were paganism against Christianity, the primitive against the civilized, and the status of men against the status of women.

The narrative of The Summer Solstice begins with St. John's Day, as it occurred in the 1850s in the Philippines. Entoy informed Doña Lupeng that Amada had participated in the Tatarin fertility ritual. Amada was believed to have become the Tatarin personified. The next day, while on board a carriage, Doña Lupeng started a conversation regarding how Amada could still believe in such a ritual. Don Paeng cut her short because children were listening. The carriage stopped, and they watched the St. John's Day procession. Thinking and speaking to herself, Doña Lupeng mocked the men's demonstration of arrogance during the procession. Upon arriving at the house, Doña Lupeng found out that Guido, Don Paeng's cousin, had participated in both the St. John's Day procession and the Tatarin ritual. Guido enjoyed the "fiestas". Guido kissed Doña Lupeng's feet as the latter was on her way to look for her children. Doña Lupeng told Don Paeng about the incident. Don Paeng was disgusted and reasoned that a woman needed love and respect, not adoration. Doña Lupeng and Don Paeng went to see the Tatarin ritual at the plaza. The revelers had their own St. John statue. Doña Lupeng joined the ceremony. Failing from pulling Doña Lupeng out of the ritual, Don Paeng had to ask the carriage driver, Entoy, to take Doña Lupeng back. At the house, Doña Lupeng was able to make Don Paeng tell her that he adored her. In submission, Don Paeng kissed Doña Lupeng's feet.

== Linguistic analysis ==
An analysis related to the language used in this piece of literature revealed that the speech or dialogue of the characters represented "stereotypical notions of masculinity and femininity", the difference between genders, and the hierarchy that bound the two sexes. In spite of the part where the character Don Paeng was presented as a crawling man who kissed the feet of Doña Lupeng, female critics viewed the story as against women and anti-feminist. On the other hand, male critics saw the short story as pro-woman and feminist.

Critics considered The Summer Solstice as pro-woman or a tale of "triumphant women" because of Don Paeng's submission to Doña Lupeng and the portrayal of women's reproductive role that made them "rulers of men".

However, there were also critics who called The Summer Solstice as "pseudo-feminist" or a work that was not truly feminist because to them the authority and power given to women in the story was unreal, short-lived, of no social value, mysterious, and illusory. Based on the story, the empowerment of women emerged only once a year, in summer, and only during the Summer solstice. The role of women in the story was further described as "demonized" and "sexualized".

== Literary reviews ==
Other items that literary critics focused on in The Summer Solstice included Joaquin's literary style and theme. In general, critics agree that Joaquin's stylistic genre was to present the way of life and culture in the Philippines during the transition from being Hispanic into American. Some critics praised Joaquin for his style of "setting the mood" for a presentation of a past full of mysticism, but others found Joaquin's melodrama as excessive thus pushing away from the story's "narrative logic and formal elements". The presentation of pagan rituals and Christian rites, superstitious and religious beliefs, the old and the new were argued to be more of a "fission" rather than a "fusion" due to the existence of the struggles occurring between the pairs mentioned. Contradicting descriptions of the Philippines during its pre-colonial past also led literary reviewers to regard Joaquin as a writer who was unable to "embrace" the ambience of such a time in Philippine history because he was more "nostalgic" of the colonial history of the country. Thus, Joaquin through The Summer Solstice and his other stories, was summarized as a search for his country's "national and cultural identity."
