= The Progress of Medicine in the Philippines =

1953 painting by Botong Francisco

- Artist: Botong Francisco
- Year: 1953
- Medium: Oil
- Dimensions: 2.92 m × 2.76 m (9.6 ft × 9.1 ft)
- Location: National Museum of Fine Arts, Manila

The Progress of Medicine in the Philippines is a painting by Filipino artist Botong Francisco. It was commissioned in 1953 to depict the history of Philippine medicine. It is currently on display in the National Museum of Fine Arts in Manila.

== Background ==
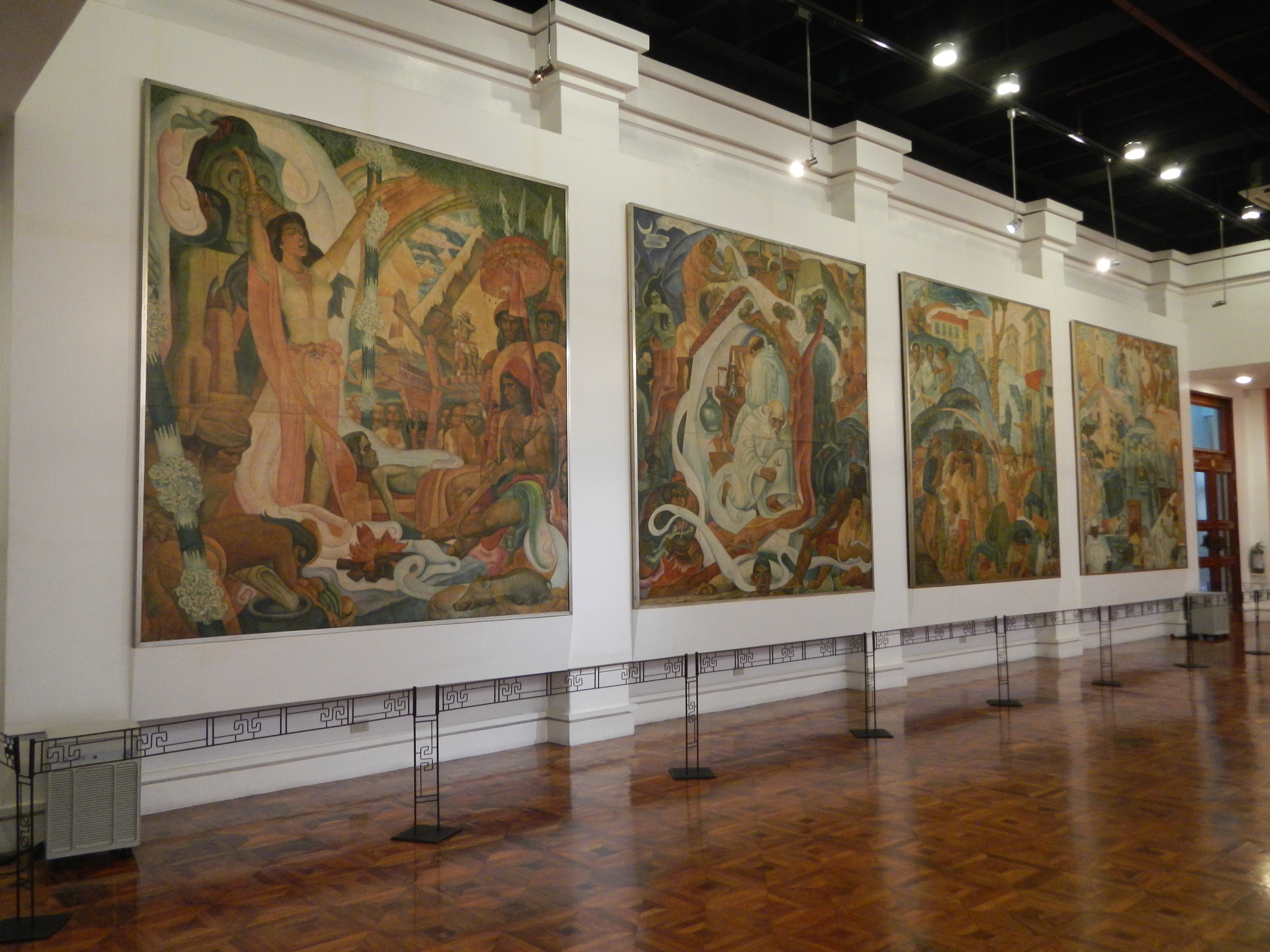
The paintings

In 1953, Dr. Agerico Sison, then director of Philippine General Hospital, and Dr. Eduardo Quisumbing, director of the National Museum, Dr. Florentino Herrera Jr., and Dr. Constantino Manahan commissioned Botong Francisco to create a painting depicting the history of Philippine medicine.

The painting consists of four oil-on-canvas panels depicting medical practice in the Philippines in four historical eras. They were displayed at the lobby of the Philippine General Hospital for 58 years until their permanent relocation to the Museum Foundation of the Philippines Hall at the National Museum of the Philippines on 27 July 2011.

== Restorations ==
Tomas Bernardo restored the panels in 1974 and 1991. Its 2006 restoration was under Orlando Abinion’s supervision and was funded by the US Department of State’s Ambassadors Fund for Cultural Preservation. Abinion's team worked on the restoration in 2006 and 2007, with conservation treatment activities including solubility testing, facing and consolidation of paint layers, cleaning of surfaces and removal of old lining and re-lining, removal of facing, surface dirt and old varnish, grafting of holes and leveling lacunae, and preliminary and final retouching.

The restored works are on indefinite loan from the University of the Philippines, PGH’s principal, and are on permanent exhibit in the National Museum of Fine Arts.

In exchange, the museum hung two reproductions created by photographer Benigno T. Tod III of the same size on the two sides of the PGH lobby.

== Cultural significance ==
On 21 September 2011, the four-panel painting was declared a national treasure for being an “irreplaceable part of the institutional heritage of the Philippine General Hospital and the University of the Philippines, and of the cultural heritage of the nation."
