= Camote Diggers =

Painting by Botong Francisco

- Artist: Botong Francisco
- Year: 1969 (unfinished)
- Medium: Oil on canvas
- Subject: Woman and young man digging for sweet potato
- Dimensions: 88 cm × 149 cm (35 in × 59 in)

Camote Diggers is an unfinished painting and considered as the last artwork by Philippine National Artist Botong Francisco prior to his death in 1969.

== Background ==
The painting depicts an old woman and a young man digging for camote (sweet potato). Camote Diggers is a 1969 oil on canvas work measuring 88 cm × 149 cm (35 in × 59 in). A smaller and finished version of Camote Diggers exists – an oil on canvas artwork which measures 27 cm × 38 cm (11 in × 15 in) and is also dated 1969. The smaller version had the inscription "To my friend Tony Kayanan, in admiration, Botong Francisco" on its back.

According to historian and curator Ambeth Ocampo, the digging of the old woman along with the young man, which he says could possibly be her son, is a commentary on the plight of the poor. Ocampo adds that the red, white, and blue in the background is meant to represent the Philippine flag, an allusion to "our sad republic, then and now".

== Condition and location ==
Camote Diggers was left unfinished and was stored inside Botong Francisco's studio until 1973, when Francisco's widow presented the artwork as a gift to then-President Ferdinand Marcos and First Lady Imelda Marcos. The Marcoses are patrons of Francisco, with their last commissioned work being The Life of Ferdinand Marcos. It was then hanged inside the Malacañang Palace, in a room next to the study of the President.

By 2004, Camote Diggers was in the possession of a son of a senator who sold it to former Central Bank Governor Jaime C. Laya.

The artwork was lent to the Yuchengco Museum from 2011 to 2019 and as part of a rotating exhibition of various National Artists. In 2012, the painting was also featured in a special retrospective on the artist called Botong Francisco: A Nation Imagined at the Ayala Museum that was subsequently published in its exhibition catalogue.

In 2019, Camote Diggers was auctioned off at the Leon Gallery Fine Art and Antiques in Manila for ₱23.4 million, inclusive of buyer's premium. However the artwork's provenance became subject of controversy with the heirs of Francisco believing that the painting should be in Malacañang. This led to the consignor, with consent of the buyer who successfully bought the painting in the auction, to donate Camote Diggers to a national museum.
