= Voyeurs & Savages =

1998 novel by Alfred A. Yuson

- The first edition (1998) bookcover for Alfred A. Yuzon's novel Voyeurs & Savages.
- Author: Alfred A. Yuson
- Language: English
- Genre: Novel
- Publisher: Anvil Publishing, Inc.
- Publication date: 1998
- Publication place: Philippines
- Media type: Print (paperback)
- Pages: 220
- ISBN: 971-27-0762-8

Voyeurs & Savages is a 1998 English-language novel written by Filipino novelist Alfred A. Yuson. The 220-page novel was published in Pasig in the Philippines by Anvil Publishing, Inc. The second edition of the novel was published by Anvil Publishing, Inc. in 2003. The novel is a winner of the Philippines' Centennial Literary Prize. The novel featured the events before, during, and after the St. Louis World Exposition of 1904 in the United States. During the exposition that was held at the St. Louis, Missouri, a group of ethnic minorities from the Mountain Province of the Philippines represented the Philippines. Apart from being representatives from the Philippines, the group of Filipinos were also the "tribal specimens" selected and exhibited by a group of American researchers and presenters during the exposition.

== Description ==
The focus of Voyeurs & Savages — Yuzon's second novel after the Great Philippine Jungle Energy Café — are the Filipino and American participants during the 1904 St. Louis World Exposition (formerly known as the Louisiana Purchase Exposition and informally as the Saint Louis World's Fair) held in the United States, and eventually the descendants of these exhibition partakers living during the latter part of the 1990s. The Filipino participants during the exposition at St. Louis, Missouri in the United States are the Kankanaey people. The Americans are the exposition team members and the visitors at the exposition. According to book reviewer Vicente G. Groyon III, the novel tackled the situation wherein the Filipinos and the Americans both acted as "voyeurs" or "watchers" — observers and scrutinizers of each other — an interaction between the surveyor and the surveyed, and between the colonizer and the colonized. In Yuzon's novel, both races acted as "Peeping Toms" who engaged in "private and public acts of self-gratification and humiliation".

== Plot ==
A current bookcover design (2003) for Alfred A. Yuson's novel Voyeurs & Savages.

Meynard, during his research on Philippine-American relations, was able to produce historical documents — an assemblage of articles, letters, pamphlets, brochures, e-mails among others. Through these documents, Meynard Aguinaldo was able to "peep" through the lives of other people, whether Filipino or American. Armando Aguinaldo, in turn — in a scene from the novel — secretly watched his nephew Meynard Aguinaldo and the daughter of Cornelius James when the dating couple were copulating inside one of the suites of his beach resort. The ending of the novel presents a scene where Cornelius James and Rowena — the grandfather and the granddaughter — were holding a "storytelling session". The exchange of stories is the bridge that fills the gap between the two people's past and present.

== Characters ==
=== The Filipinos ===
Among the principal characters of the novel is Meynard Aguinaldo, a Filipino graduate student who became a scholar and historian. The other Filipino characters in Voyeurs & Savages were given "bloodlines" or ties to important Filipino heroes. Apart from Meynard Aguinaldo, the other Filipino characters Armando Aguinaldo (also known as Lolo Mando, meaning "Grandfather Mando"), Lakay Tomlo (also known by his Christian name Antonio), Wilson Cangbay, and Carlos. Meynard is the grandnephew of General Emilio Aguinaldo, the first and only president of the First Republic of the Philippines. Lakay Tomlo is the chieftain of the Kankanai people. Wilson Cangbay is a Mountain Province tour guide. Carlos, although a "hulking" or big and well-muscled homosexual, is the bodyguard to Armando Aguinaldo, a businessman, con artist, beach resort owner, pimp, and voyeur (at his beach resort known as New Wave, Armando actually peeps through two-way mirrors while guests are at their most private and intimate moments, such as the act of making love to each other, thus violating the privacy of his clients and visitors).

=== The Americans ===
The American characters include Cornelius James and Rowena. Cornelius James is a researcher and member of the team from the United States who selected the "Filipino specimens" from the Mountain Province for the St. Louis exhibit. Rowena is Cornelius James' granddaughter.

== Literary technique ==
In the novel, Yuzon used the technique of placing the past and the present alongside each other as a form of recollection, a commentary of both the past and the present that overlaps and intersects as the narrative progresses. Through Voyeurs & Savages, Yuzon was able to reveal that people — whether dominator or subordinator — likes to watch, and both live to watch other people. Yuzon succeeded in utilizing the "voyeuristic impulse" of human beings to "sustain interest and develop the narrative" for his novel. Yuzon's "random recall" or "haphazard recollection and narration" of the "revolutionary dreams" and hopes of the Filipinos during the latter part of the 19th century, and the Philippines' "leap of faith" to the present was able to produce an absorbing and non-linear way of narration that creates the repeating question of "who are savaging whom?" among the characters — whether Filipino or American — in Voyeurs & Savages.

== See also ==
- Pioneers of photography in the Philippines
