= Socorro Ramos =

Filipino businesswoman (born 1923)

- Born: Maria Socorro Cancio; 23 September 1923 (age 103); Santa Cruz, Laguna, Philippines
- Other name: Nanay Coring
- Occupation: Entrepreneur
- Known for: Co-founder of National Book Store
- Spouse: José Ramos (died 1992)
- Children: 3
- Awards: Outstanding Manilan Award

Maria Socorro Cancio Ramos (born 23 September 1923) is a Filipino businesswoman. She is the co-founder of National Book Store, the largest bookstore chain in the Philippines.

== Biography ==
Maria Socorro Cancio Ramos was born on 23 September 1923 in Santa Cruz, Laguna. She grew up in a rich entrepreneurial family, she began assisting in her parents' shop and her grandmother's market stall at a young age. After graduating from Arellano High School, she worked as a shop girl at the Ramos Goodwill Book Store. Socorro's brother Manuel married one of the daughters of the Ramos family, leading to the opening of a new bookshop on Escolta Street in 1940, located on the ground floor of Panciteria National. José Ramos was put in charge and asked Socorro to come and work for him. The store was called National Book Store. Despite facing opposition from her family, Socorro married José shortly thereafter.

During the Japanese occupation, many of the American books were hidden and the couple mainly sold office supplies, soap, and flip flops. However, during the Battle of Manila in 1945, their store went up in flames and they had to start over with the stash of hidden books. Unfortunately, three years later, disaster struck again when a typhoon again destroyed the rebuilt store at its new Rizal Avenue location. Nevertheless, the National Book Store was once again reconstructed, this time with a mezzanine.

Over time, the store expanded. New branches were opened at the intercession of the three children of Socorro and Jose. The company became a real family business and grew into a chain of bookstores with branches throughout the country. In the 1990s, the chain had about 50 branches. Twenty years later, there were 145. The National Book Store became the largest bookstore chain in the Philippines and one of the largest companies in the Philippine retail industry.

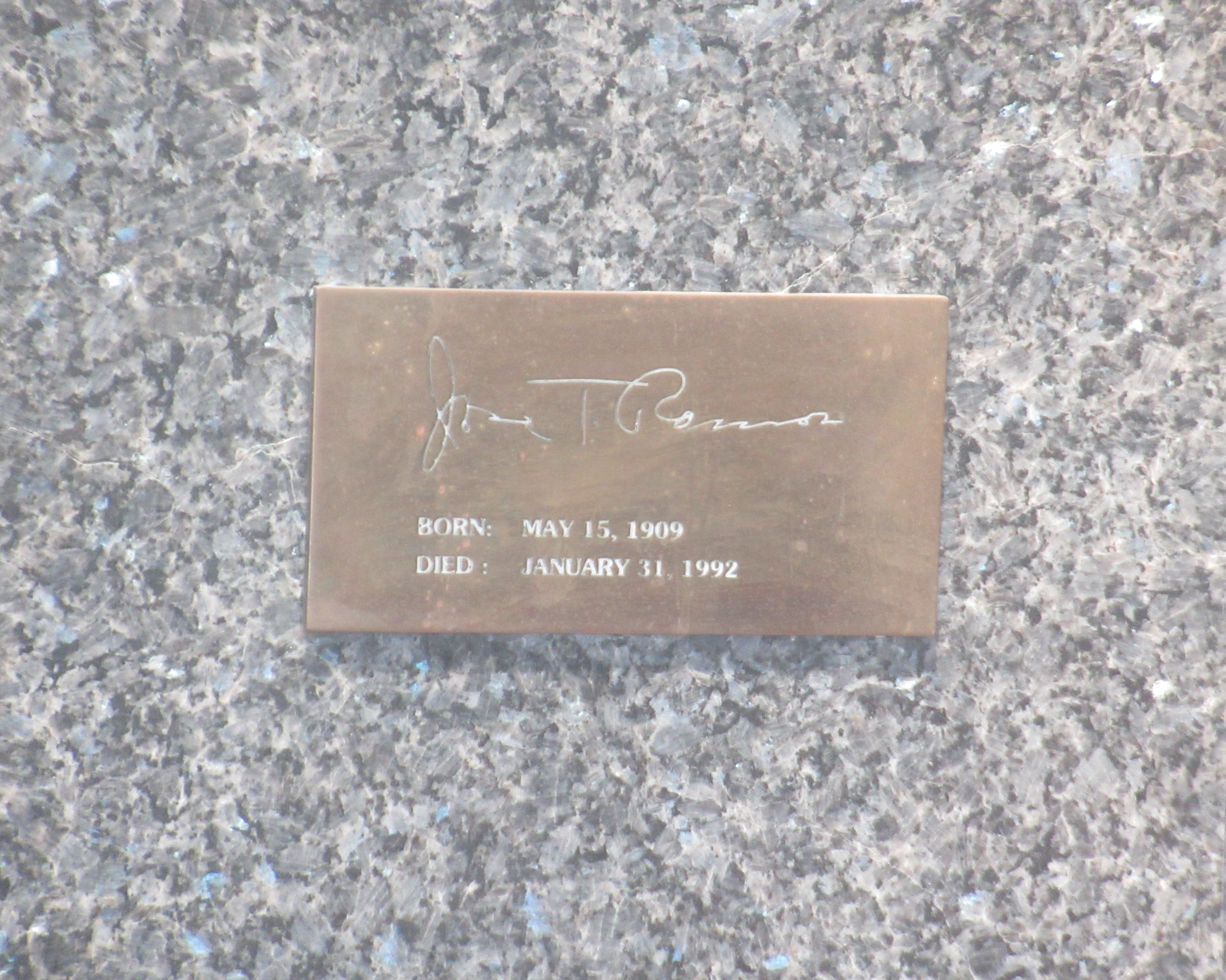
José T. Ramos' (husband of Socorro Ramos) family mausoleum at Manila Memorial Park – Sucat.

Ramos turned 100 in September 2023.

== Awards and recognition ==
In 2017, Ramos was one of the recipients of the Outstanding Manilan Award.
