= Botong Francisco =

Filipino artist (1912–1969)

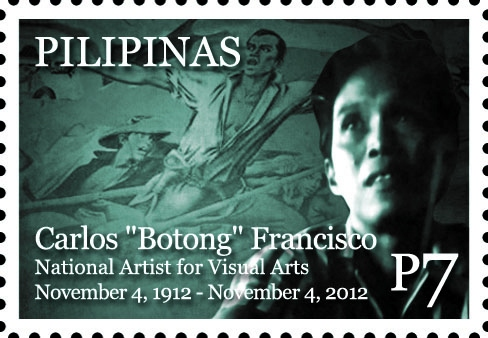
- Francisco on a 2012 stamp of the Philippines
- Born: Carlos Modesto Villaluz Francisco; November 4, 1912; Angono, Rizal, Insular Government of the Philippine Islands, U.S.
- Died: March 31, 1969 (aged 56); Angono, Rizal, Philippines
- Resting place: Angono Catholic Cemetery
- Other name: Botong
- Occupation: Painter / Muralist
- Parents: Felipe Francisco (father); Maria Villaluz (mother)
- Awards: Order of National Artists of the Philippines

Carlos Modesto "Botong" Villaluz Francisco (November 4, 1912 – March 31, 1969) was a Filipino muralist from Angono, Rizal.

== Biography ==
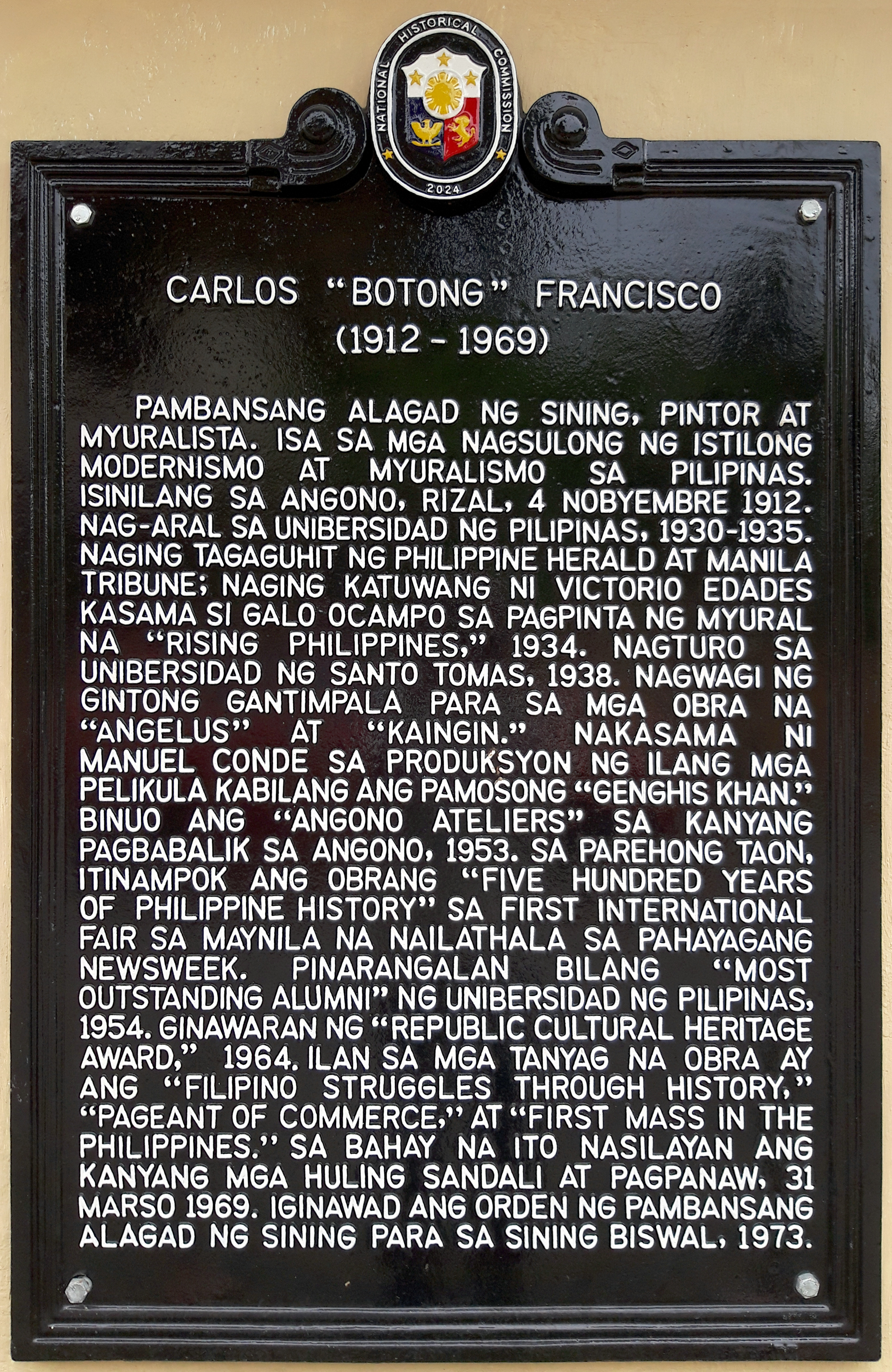
National historical marker unveiled in 2024 outside Francisco's house in Angono, Rizal

Botong was a most distinguished practitioner of mural painting for many decades and best known for his historical pieces. He was one of the first Filipino modernists along with Galo Ocampo and Victorio C. Edades who broke away from Fernando Amorsolo's romanticism of Philippine scenes. According to restorer Helmuth Josef Zotter, Botong's art "is a prime example of linear painting where lines and contours appear like cutouts."

Botong served as the production designer for the 1961 film adaptation of José Rizal's Noli Me Tángere.

He was responsible for the discovery of the now famous Angono Petroglyphs in 1965. He was also involved in Costume Design in Philippine cinema.

His great works include portrayals of the Blood Compact, First Mass at Limasawa, The Martyrdom of Rizal, Bayanihan, Magpupukot, Fiesta, Bayanihan sa Bukid, Sandugo, Portrait of Purita, The Invasion of Limahong, Serenade, and Muslim Betrothal. Some of his murals have suffered big damage over the years. The "Pageant of Commerce" emerged from several years of restoration in 2000.

His murals, The Progress of Medicine in the Philippines, was restored for the 3rd time in 2007 and is currently residing in the National Art Gallery of the Philippines. A high-quality replica of the mural is also located at its previous location at the lobby of the Philippine General Hospital. Hi last work is the Camote Diggers which was left unfinished when he died on March 31, 1969, in Angono, Rizal.

== Gallery ==
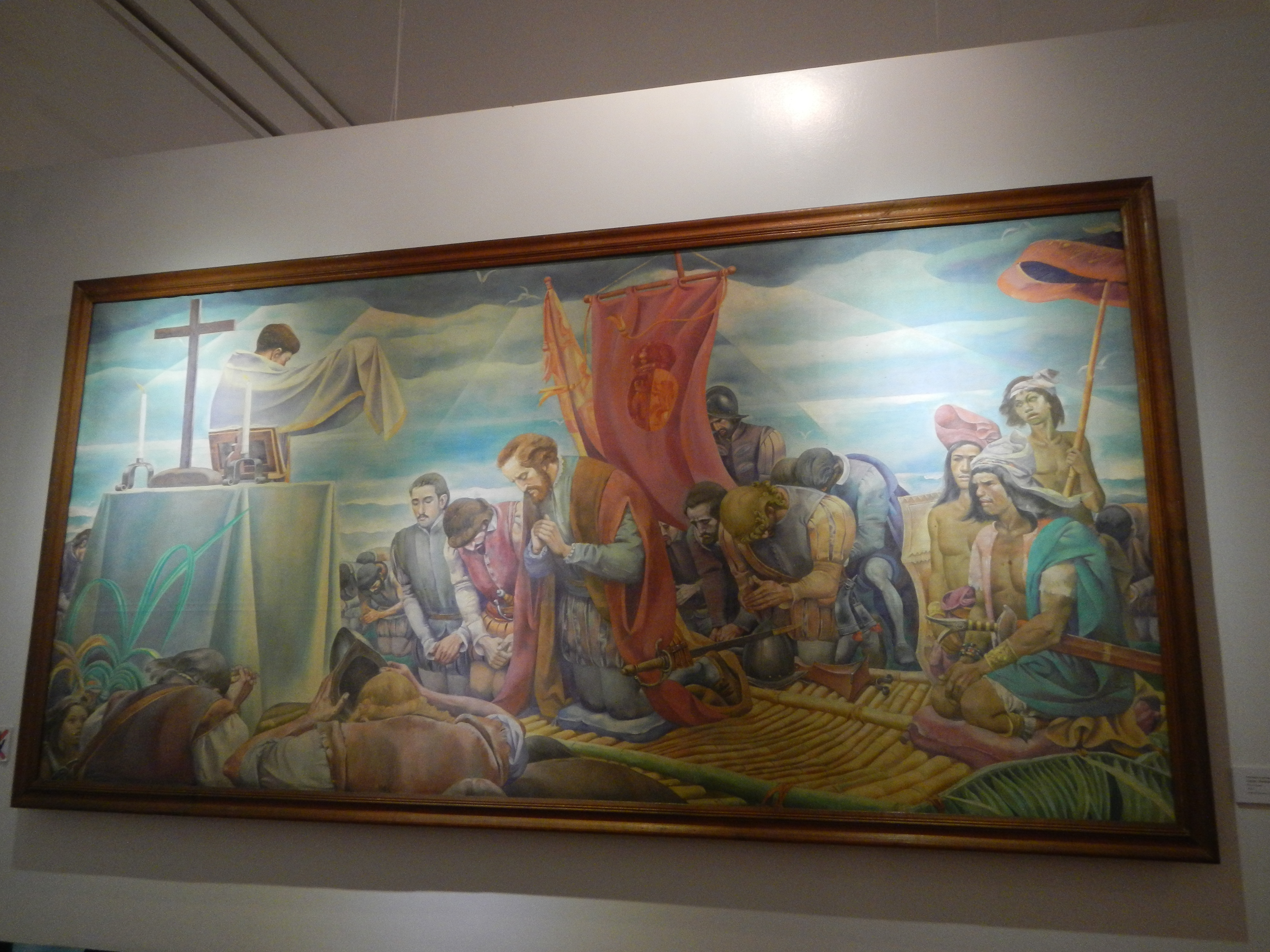
First Mass at Limasawa

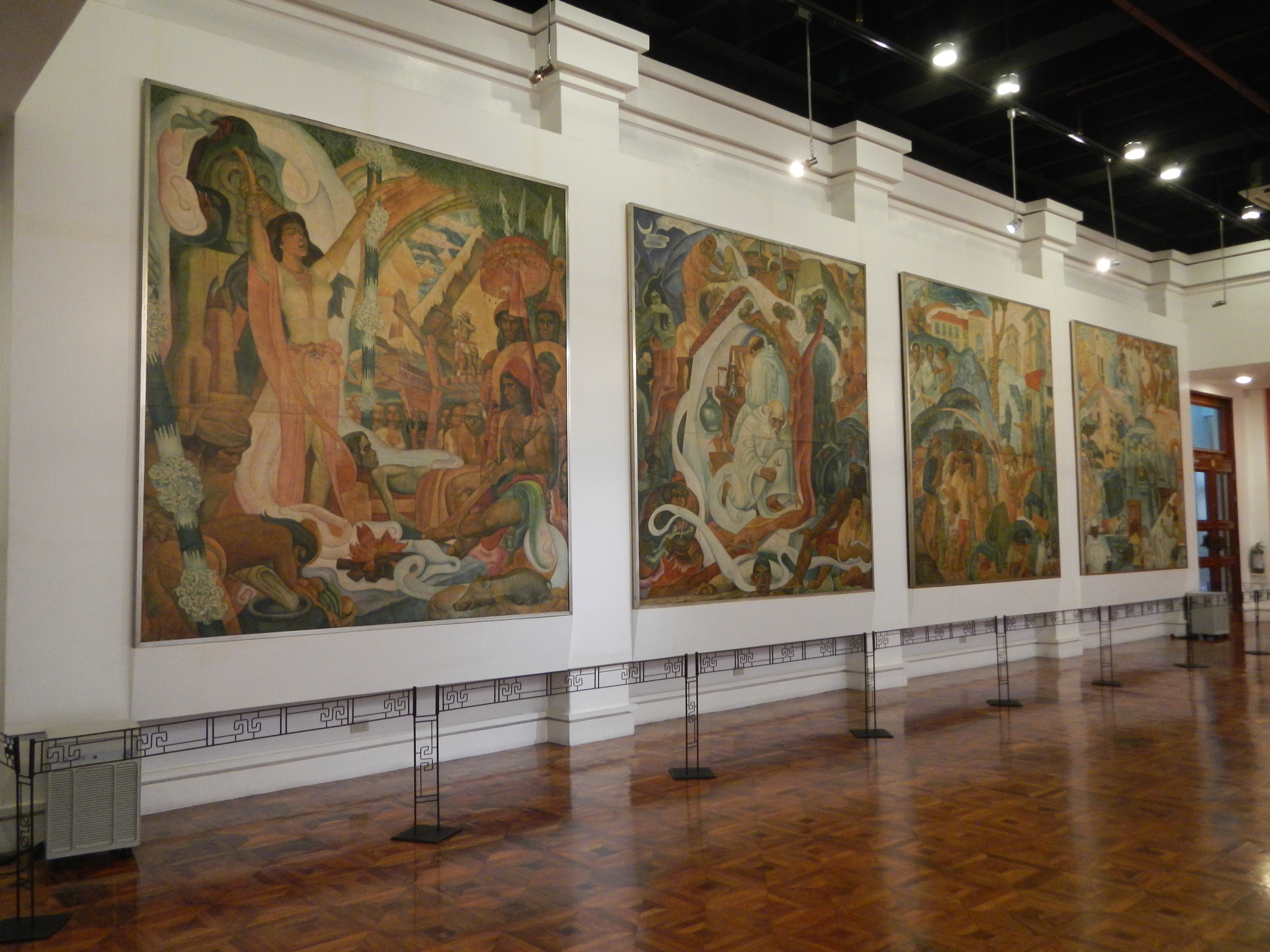
The Progress of Medicine in the Philippines
