= National Book Store =

Bookstore and office supplies store chain in the Philippines

- Type: Private
- Industry: Retail
- Founded: Manila, Philippines (March 15, 1942; 84 years ago)
- Founder: Socorro Cancio-Ramos; José Ramos
- Headquarters: G/F Quad Alpha Centrum, 125 Pioneer Street, Mandaluyong 1550, Metro Manila, Philippines
- Key people: Socorro Cancio-Ramos (Chairwoman)
- Products: Books; Office supplies School supplies Office furniture
- Number of employees: 2,500 (2015)
- Subsidiaries: Anvil Publishing; Metrobooks (Hong Kong); Powerbooks
- Website: www.nationalbookstore.com

National Book Store, Inc. (also spelled National Bookstore and abbreviated as NBS) is a retail company based in Mandaluyong, Metro Manila, Philippines. It operates a bookstore and office-supplies store chain of the same name. It is the largest bookstore chain in the Philippines with over 260 branches nationwide.

== History ==
=== Early history ===
The history of National Book Store can be traced back to the 1930s. However, the company has been formally established in 1942. Before the Japanese occupation of the Philippines during World War II, José Ramos and Socorro Cáncio-Ramos, rented a small-corner space of a Haberdashery situated at the foot of Escolta Bridge in Santa Cruz, Manila. With a starting capital of ₱211 (equivalent to ₱59,000 in 2021), the Ramoses set up their first retail bookstore selling GI novels, textbooks and supplies. During World War II, the store shifted to selling sold candies, soap, and slippers due to stringent book censorship. The store experienced success but was burned down during the 1945 Battle of Manila, rebuilt again and reverted to selling textbooks and stationery, the opening of the rebuilt National Book Store at the corner of Soler Street and Avenida Rizal, coincided with the first academic schoolyear after the war. In 1948, the store was destroyed by Typhoon Gene but a new two-story building with a mezzanine was built to host National Book Store.

National Book Store began selling greeting cards in the 1950s depicting Philippine subjects to showcase local culture and traditions. The book store also launched a publishing program with international publishers such as McGraw-Hill, Prentice Hall, Lippincott, Addison-Wesley. In 1955, the Ramoses were able to acquire a lot owned by the Guerrero family, where they erected the nine-story Albercer Building in 1963 which was named after Alfredo, Benjamin, and Cecilia, where a National Book Store was hosted.

National Book Store accumulated enough capital after several years to acquire rights to reprint foreign brand greeting cards for the Philippine market. The book store had rights to reprint cards by Gibson for a few years. In 1973, outbid a more established competitor for a Philippine franchise of the greeting card brand, Hallmark.

=== Expansion and recent history ===
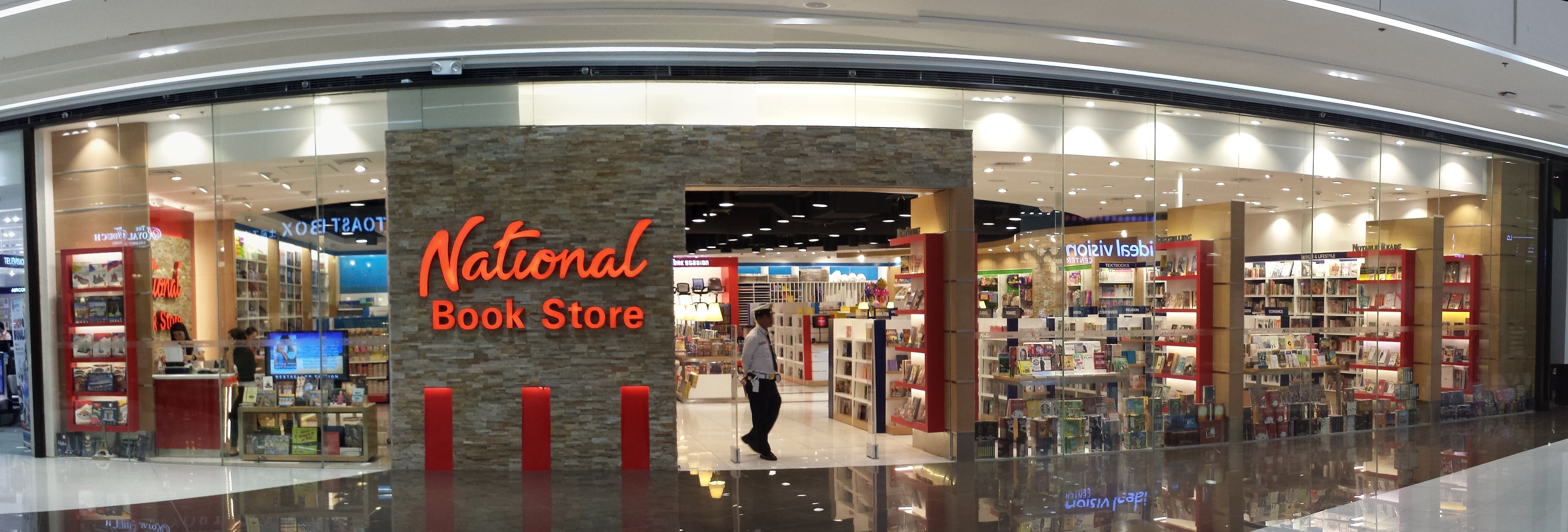
National Book Store in SM Aura Premier, BGC

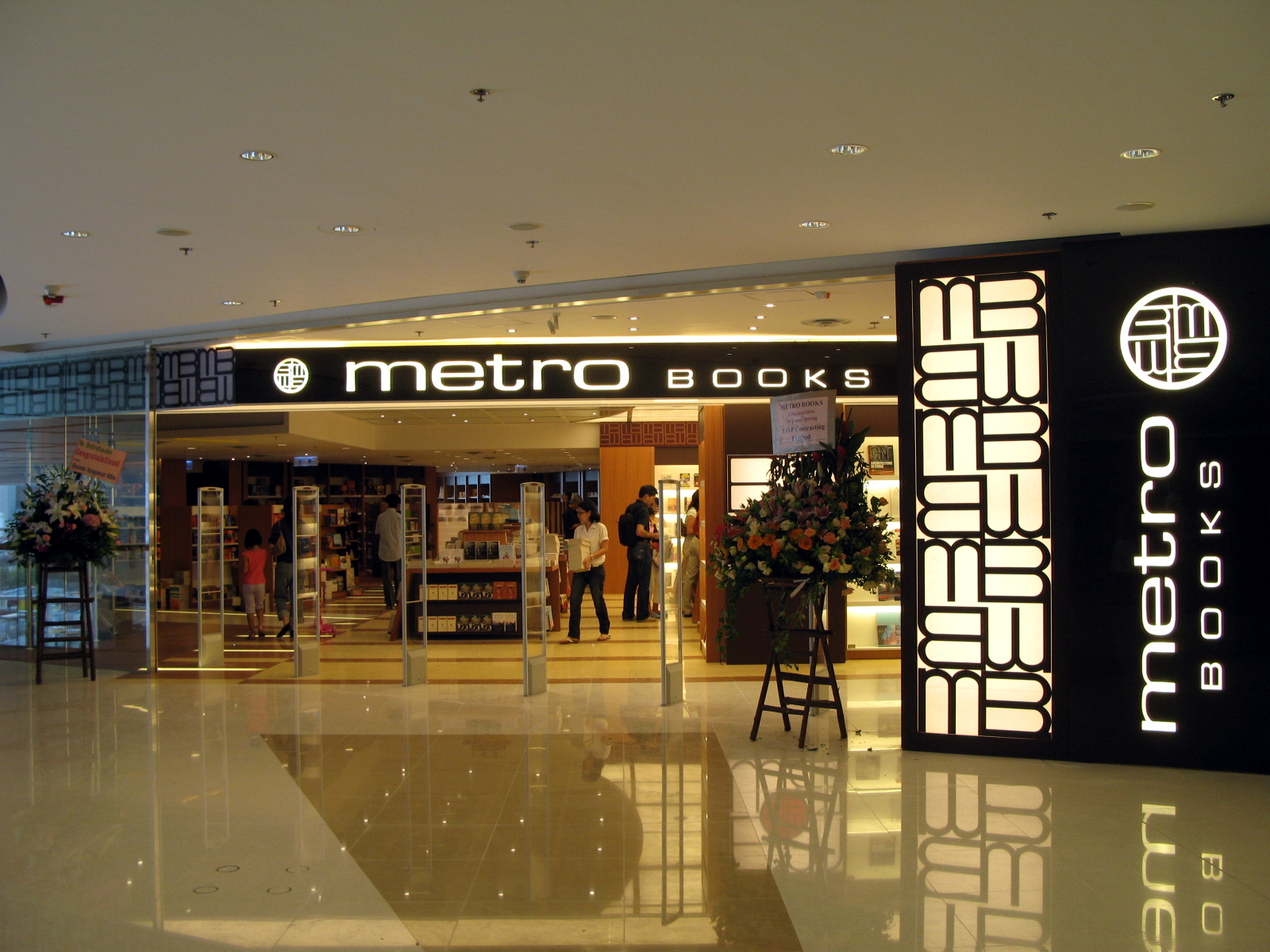
Metrobooks in Elements, Hong Kong (2007)

The Ramos children proposed expanding the scope of National Book Store, and a branch along Recto Avenue was opened, an area often frequented by students. In the 1970s, branches were opened in shopping malls in Makati and Cubao, Quezon City. For the next decades since the opening of the Recto branch, the book store grew with shopping mall owners approaching the Ramoses to set up a store inside their properties. National Book Store became one of the top 100 Philippine corporations in 1988, registering profits of $1 million on gross revenues of $34.7 million. The book store chain also became one of the Top 500 of the list by Retail Asia-Pacific, ranking 308th in 2004.

In 2015, National Book Store captures the majority of the Philippine book market having a share amounting to 80 percent, and operates around 127 branches across the Philippines. It also operates Metrobooks, which opened in Hong Kong in 2007, a subsidiary based in the former British crown colony. The book store was believed to have closed in May 2018.

With the pending entry of National Book Store into the Philippine Stock Exchange through the renaming of Vulcan Industrial & Mining Corp., another Ramos-owned company, into National Book Store Retail Corp. they would now also venture into wholesale, publishing, printing, manufacturing, and distribution.

It entered the education industry in 2017 with the launch of NBS College, its first institution for higher learning at the National Book Store building on Quezon Avenue and by 2018, it has now 230 branches all over the country. NBS, under College president Adrian Paulino S. Ramos offers six academic degree programs: BS Accountancy, BS Accounting Information System, BS Entrepreneurship, BS Computer Science, BS Library and Information Science and BS Tourism Management.

== Subsidiaries ==
Among National Book Store subsidiaries are Powerbooks, a specialty store for books, and Metrobooks, a book store based in Hong Kong. Anvil Publishing serves as its publishing arm. In late 2016, they launched three new specialty stores: Art Bar, for arts and crafts; Noteworthy, for stationery and gift items; and Work Station, for office supplies and equipment.

== Brand image ==
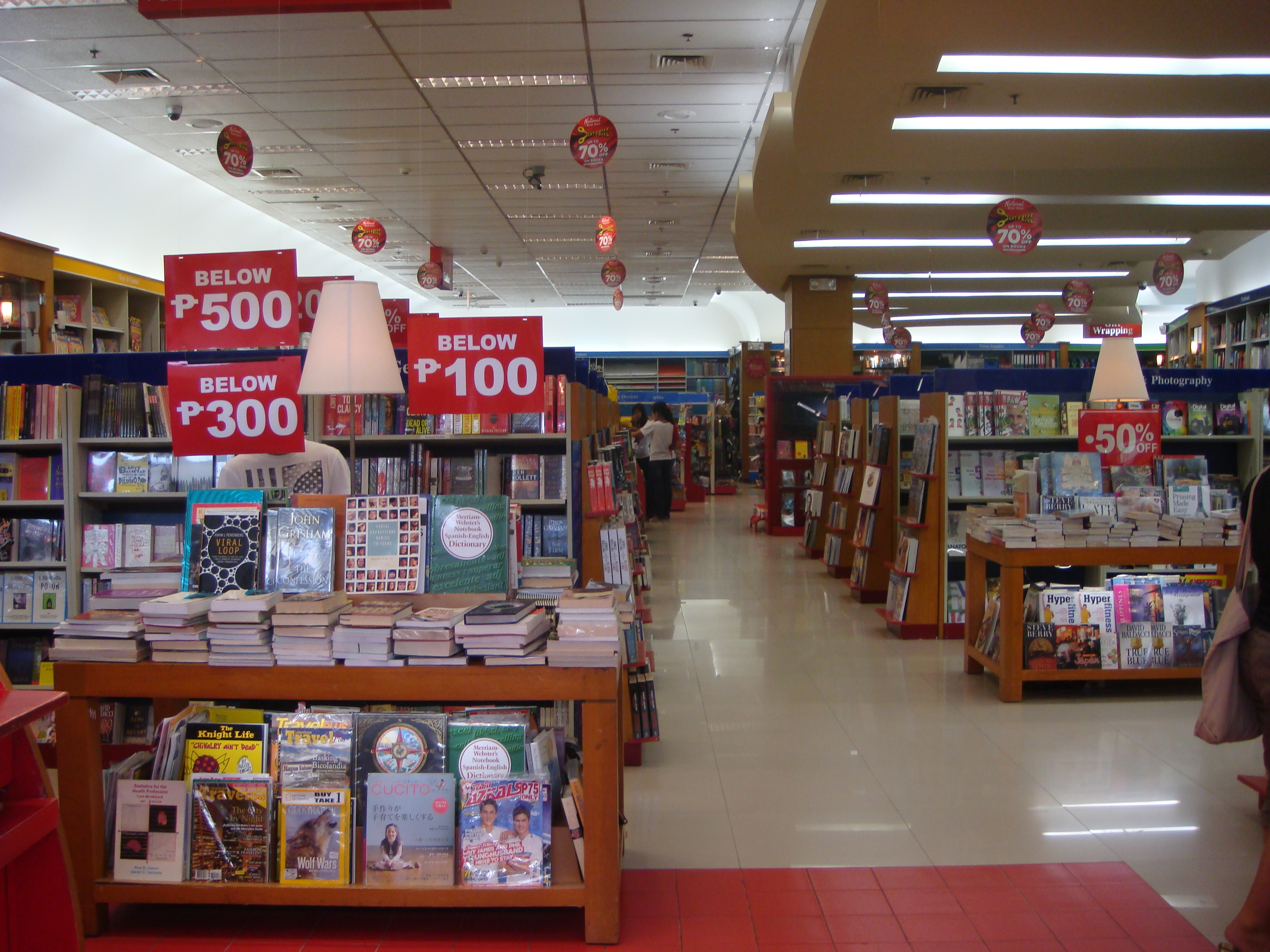
Typical store interior

The brand name of National Book Store was thought of by Socorro Ramos, one of the co-founders. No marketing research was conducted and was done on Ramos' impulse, taking the book store name from the National Cash Register machine, a popular brand at the time of the book store's founding.

For fifty years from the book store's establishment, the logo, designed by Ramos herself, was used, which consists of the store's name on a white background surrounded by a red and white stripe design. Ramos' first logo was created by placing the store's name in a striped wrapper, and her children found the logo satisfactory.

A new logo was adopted in 1996 following a proposal from Ramos' children and grandchildren, which features the store's name in a more modern font on a red background. In a vote made within the company, 15 voted for adopting the new logo, with only Ramos herself voting against the change. The new logo design was commissioned by a Singapore-based company that also created a new store layout design.

A new store design was executed in 2016, starting with its branch in SM City North EDSA. National Book Store collaborated with French design firm Malherbe for a new, more modern and contemporary design for their book store outlets.
