= Pio Abad =

Filipino artist

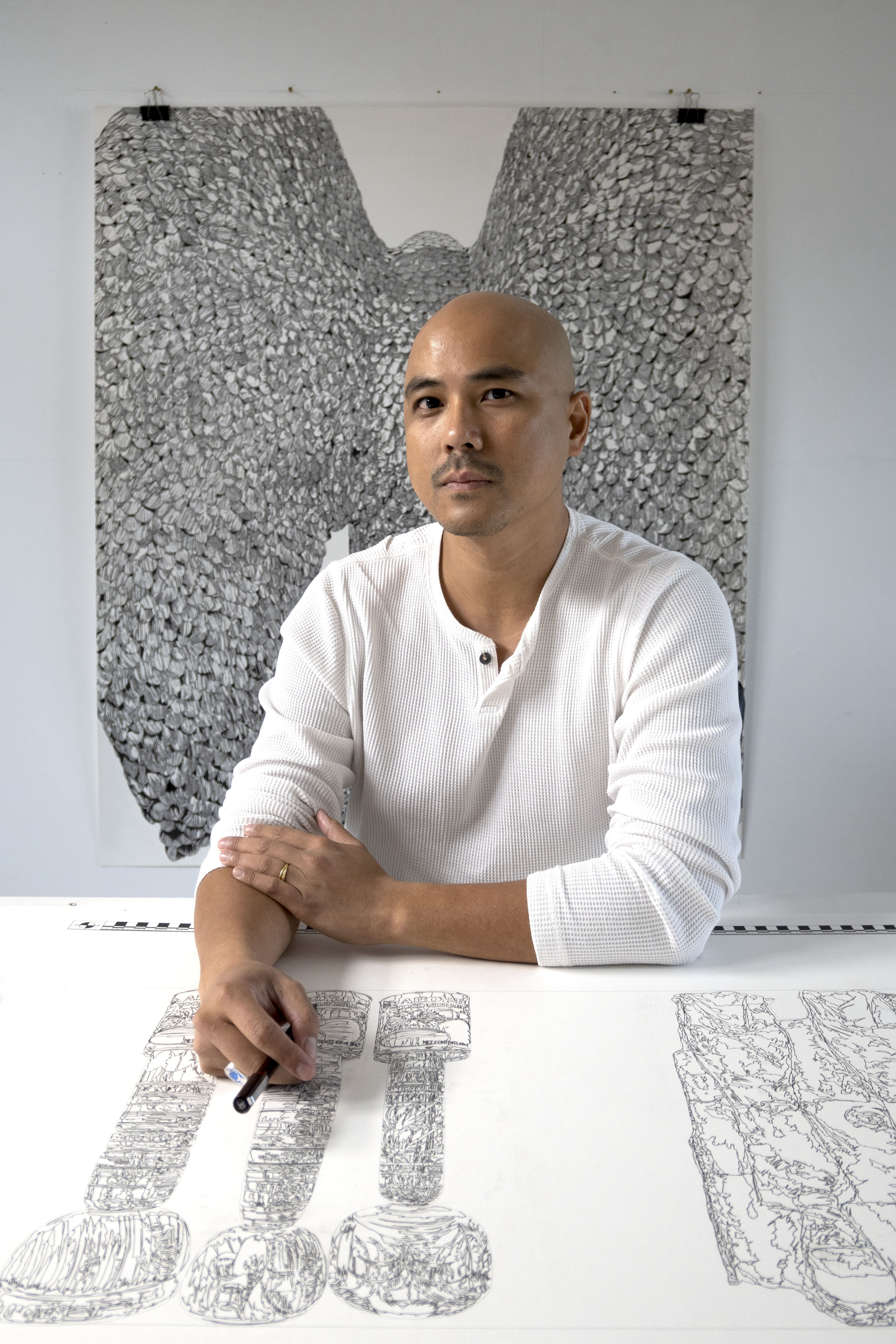
- Pio Abad in 2024
- Born: 1983 (age 41–42); Manila
- Spouse: Frances Wadsworth Jones
- Website: Artist's Website

Pio Abad (born 1983) is a Filipino visual artist based in London.

== Early life and education ==
Pio Abad was born in Manila, Philippines. He grew up in the final years of the Marcos era, and his parents were both political activists who played key roles in the social democratic movement that toppled the dictatorship. He attended the private day school Ateneo de Manila High School

Abad began his studies in Fine Art at the University of the Philippines, before moving to Glasgow to study Painting and Printmaking at the Glasgow School of Art.

In 2012, he graduated with a Masters in Fine Art at the Royal Academy of Arts.

== Work ==
His parents campaigned for justice during a time of conflict and corruption under the dictatorship of Ferdinand Marcos, and it is the need to remember this history that has shaped the foundations of his work. Abad's works are part of a number of important collections including Tate, UK; Carnegie Museum of Art, Pittsburgh; Hawai’i State Art Museum, Honolulu and Singapore Art Museum. He has also participated in Is it morning for you yet?, The 58th Carnegie International, Pittsburgh (2022) In Our Veins Flow Ink and Fire, 5th Kochi-Muziris Biennial, Kerala (2022); To Make Wrong/Right/Now, 2nd Honolulu Biennial, Hawaii (2019), and Imagined Nations/Modern Utopias, 12th Gwangju Biennial, Korea (2018).

=== The Collection of Jane Ryan and William Saunders ===
The Collection of Jane Ryan and William Saunders is an ongoing research project that spans a number of solo and group exhibitions from 2014. The project draws attention to the roles that certain artifacts have played in the recent history of the Philippines, specifically in shaping the cultural legacy of former Philippine dictators Ferdinand and Imelda Marcos and the absurd postcolonial ideology they enforced under the auspices of capitalist democracies during the Cold War. Using inexpensive reproduction techniques, Abad recreates items from their lavish collection of Regency-era silverware, old master paintings of uneven quality and dubious provenance and, curiously, Yugoslav naïf paintings on glass.

Part of this long-term artistic project is a sculptural collaboration with Abad's wife, the jewelry designer Frances Wadsworth Jones, concerning Imelda Marcos’ jewellery collection. Since 2017, they have been reconstructing the Marcos jewellery collection one facet at a time. The work comments on power, corruption and the ownership of material objects. Jane Ryan and William Saunders were the pseudonyms adopted by Ferdinand and Imelda Marcos in 1968 to set up a Swiss bank account that notoriously became a depository for funds diverted from the Philippine treasury for their private benefit. In Abad and Wadsworth Jones's collection, "the jewels exist not as luxurious accessories but as a spectral line-up that hovers between evidence and effigy, carrying with it the painful history of a nation". The work was exhibited at the Honolulu Biennial and Jameel Arts Centre, and was acquired by the Tate in 2021.

In 2019, his exhibition at KADIST San Francisco, Kiss the Hand You Cannot Bite, "examine[d] the political consequences of Ferdinand Marcos's dictatorship in the Philippines, and its effects abroad."

==== Ateneo Art Gallery exhibition ====
In 2022, he exhibited Fear of Freedom Makes Us See Ghosts at the Ateneo Art Gallery, which opened weeks before the late Filipino dictator Ferdinand Marcos' son Ferdinand "Bongbong" Marcos Jr. won the Philippine presidential election.

The exhibition was a culmination of Abad's ten-year project examining the conjugal dictatorship of Ferdinand and Imelda Marcos, employing a wide variety of media from the traditional forms of painting and photography to new innovations such as 3D printing and augmented reality.

===== Monograph =====
His artist monograph Fear of Freedom Makes Us See Ghosts was published in 2024 by Hato Press and Ateneo Art Gallery.

=== To Those Sitting in Darkness ===
In 2024, Abad's solo exhibition To Those Sitting in Darkness opened at The Ashmolean Museum in Oxford, England. His works are exhibited together with select works by other artists such as Filipino artist Carlos Villa, as well as objects from Oxford collections, chosen by the artist.

The exhibition "maps one example of how art can trouble institutional norms through interference and imaginative reconstruction".

== Awards and nominations ==
In 2024, he was nominated for the Turner Prize for his exhibition To Those Sitting in Darkness at The Ashmolean Museum, Oxford.

Sam Thorne, a jury member running the Japan House cultural center in London, said that Abad's work feels timely, raising questions about restitution. The show told stories of "plunder and exchange" said Thorne, highlighting "entangled histories" around colonialism. "We were struck with how it chimed with inscription and incision", Thorne added.

== Pacita Abad ==
Abad is also the curator of the estate of his aunt, the Filipino American artist Pacita Abad.
