= Rizal Without the Overcoat =

1990 book by Ambeth Ocampo

- Cover image from 2003 Expanded Edition.
- Language: English
- Subject: Jose Rizal; Philippine history
- Publisher: Anvil Publishing Inc.
- Publication date: 1990
- Publication place: Philippines
- Pages: 160
- Awards: National Book Award for Essay; NBDB Book Award for Essay
- ISBN: 9789712700439
- OCLC: 645936444

Rizal Without the Overcoat is a book by Filipino writer Ambeth Ocampo, adapted from his "Looking Back" column in the Philippine Daily Globe from October 1987 to July 1990. These writings were attempts to "translate" José Rizal and his historical context so that he could be better understood by a new generation—to present "a "new" Rizal that had been obscured by school and myth."

In 1999, an expanded edition of the book was published to which was added an award-winning series of commentary on Rizal which Ocampo had written. His column by then had moved to the Philippine Daily Inquirer. The book is frequently used as a reference for college courses on the Life and Works of José Rizal, which is mandated by law (Republic Act 1425) as a required course for all college students. It won the 1990 National Book Award for the Essay. Although it garnered immense popularity, the book is criticized for its lack of conceptual and analytic contribution to the larger debate in Philippine historiography.
