= The Woman Who Had Two Navels =

1961 novel by Nick Joaquín

- Cover of the Filipino Literary Classics imprint
- Author: Nick Joaquín
- Language: English
- Genre: Fiction
- Publication date: 1961
- Publication place: Philippines

The Woman Who Had Two Navels is a 1961 novel by Nick Joaquín, a National Artist for Literature and leading English-language writer from the Philippines. It is considered a classic in Philippine literature. It was the recipient of the first Harry Stonehill Award.

It tells the story of an elite Filipina who is hallucinating, and is preoccupied with the notion that she has two navels or belly buttons in order to be treated as an extraordinary person.

== Thematic description ==
This novel by Joaquin is a literary assessment of the influence of the past to the time encompassing events in the Philippines after World War II, an examination of an assortment of legacy and heritage and the questions of how an individual can exercise free will and deal with the “shock” of experiencing “epiphanic recognition”.

== Main characters ==
Among the characters are Manolo Vidal and his family, Connie Escobar, Esteban and Concha Borromeo, Father Tony, Paco Texeira, and Doctor Monson, a former rebel hiding in Hong Kong to avoid postwar trials.

Connie Escobar, the female protagonist, was described by literary critic Epifanio San Juan as a sufferer of her mother’s estrangement from a world where unconfident males take advantage of women by either violating or venerating them. Connie is married to Macho Escobar, a man who had an affair with Connie’s mother that serves as an “umbilical cord” or "umbilicus", a remnant connected to her present and future because of her refusal to leave the issue in the past.

According to San Juan, the character of Manolo Vidal is the embodiment of the Filipino nationalistic bourgeoisie who were once critical of the theocracy of the Spaniards but became transformed puppets and servants of the colonialists. While, on the other hand, Macho Escobar is not a revolutionary but a member of the dehumanized clan of hacenderos or landlords of sugar plantations. Paco Texeira was a survivor of the behaviors of the Monson and Vidal families, and also acted as Joaquín’s “conscience”, an observer who could have penetrated the existing rituals and ruses. Texeira had the capacity to apprehend and break the class barrier depicted in the novel’s society, but refused to do so.
