= Political positions of Bam Aquino =

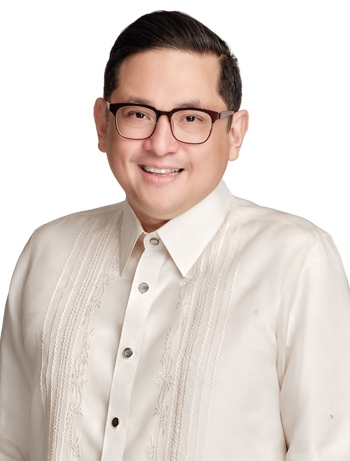
Bam Aquino’s official portrait in 2025.

Bam Aquino, a former social entrepreneur, later senator of the Philippines from 2013 to 2019 and again from 2025 after winning in the 2025 Philippine Senate election, regards himself as a pro-people politician, and has vowed to be the "voice of the voiceless" representing people's "real concerns" amidst the feuding of political parties in the Senate. A member of the Katipunan ng Nagkakaisang Pilipino (KNP or KANP, lit. 'Society of United Filipinos'), a party for youth empowerment whose members notably include human rights lawyer Chel Diokno, and formerly of the Liberal Party (Liberal/LP), a party with social liberal and progressive factions, Aquino is focused on raising the national budget for improving the quality of the country's public education and its access to technology, as well as fighting inflation by exposing the country's cartels. In the Senate itself, he has been tagged as a champion for the empowerment of Filipino families through their education, employability, and access to the entrepreneurship ecosystem.

During his first tenure in the Senate, Aquino was the principal sponsor and co-author of Republic Act 10931 (the Universal Access to Quality Tertiary Education Act), which institutionalized free tuition and the subsidizing of other school fees in the country's state and local universities and colleges as well as all Technical Education and Skills Development Authority (TESDA)-accredited technical vocational institutions. He also principally authored and sponsored RA 10644 (the Go Negosyo Act), which promoted "ease of doing business" for micro-, small and medium enterprises through the nationwide establishment of Negosyo Centers. While himself a member of the Aquino family, Aquino filed an anti-political dynasty bill in 2018, which was however stalled during second reading.

Aquino failed in his bid for reelection in the 2019 election. In the 2022 Philippine Senate election, he abandoned his plan to run anew in order to serve as the campaign manager of the 2022 presidential run of then-Vice President Leni Robredo, who was then chairman of the Liberal Party and was running for president on an open government and participatory democracy platform. KNP was formed in that year specifically for Robredo's campaign.

As a member of the KNP, Aquino is part of a coalition that includes the Liberal, progressive political party Akbayan, and the Liberal's sectoral wing, Mamamayang Liberal (Liberal Citizens). In the 2025 general election, all four parties attained a space for themselves within Congress to form an opposition faction under the Marcos administration. Mamamayang Liberal ran with a party list in the 2025 House of Representatives election, with human rights lawyer Leila de Lima as its first nominee, followed by indigenous rights activist Teddy Baguilat and labor rights advocate Erin Tañada. Baguio mayor Benjamin Magalong, an anti-corruption advocate and chairman of the Mayors for Good Governance group, also supported Aquino's run in the 2025 Senate election.

From 2001 to 2007, Aquino hosted two youth-oriented shows on ABS-CBN's Studio 23, and in 2012 had a business-oriented program on GMA News TV.

== Economics ==
To Aquino, legislation that aims to help lower the price of goods should want to go after the cartels in the import business sector while, in turn, seeking to eliminate the red tape in the country's ports.

Previous to co-authoring the Go Negosyo Act, he pushed for the Micro-Finance Institute NGOs Act, which aids the micro-financing sector and its beneficiaries, and the Youth Entrepreneurship Act, which mandates the teaching of financial literacy and entrepreneurship in schools.

During the 2025 Philippine Senate election campaign, he said he is in favor of a hike in the minimum wage.

== Education ==
Even after the success of the Universal Access to Quality Tertiary Education Act, Aquino has been pushing for increases in the national budget for the education sector and a particular law that would ensure that such a fund would be properly used. Noting that the Philippines currently has an education crisis, he intends to push legislation on education that would specifically address the current gaps in the curriculum, access to technology, and infrastructure development, and that would reform the country's existing K-12 law with the aim of making future senior high school graduates more employable.

He is against calls for a mandatory training for the Reserve Officers' Training Corps.

== Transparency and corruption ==
=== Government corruption ===
Aquino is also pushing for laws with a clearer approach to combating government corruption.

=== Political families ===
Aquino also wants to re-file his anti-political dynasty bill, saying that the concentration of power in a few wealthy families in the country is counterintuitive to maintaining a democracy.

== Foreign policy ==
=== China ===
Aquino agrees with the current Marcos administration's policies on the West Philippine Sea, including its so-called "assertive transparency initiative" of making public China's aggressive actions in the disputed area.

=== United States ===
He disagrees that the country has been pivoting too much towards the United States while believing there are yet more that can be gained from the country's long-time ally, particularly in the area of obtaining defense equipment.

As regards the idea of expanding the United States' access to Philippine military bases, however, Aquino says he still has many reservations.

== Rule of law ==
Aquino says those responsible in the extrajudicial killings that occurred during the drug war of former president Rodrigo Duterte must be brought to justice. While he agrees that Duterte must face the charges against him in the International Criminal Court, he says it is important for the former president to also be tried in a Philippine court.

He says he approves of the current post-Duterte era implementation of the Philippines' war on drugs.

== Environment ==
=== Emergency management ===
Aquino has called for intensifying the country's disaster preparedness not just towards typhoons and floods but also towards extreme heat, stressing that the climate crisis is also producing a health crisis.

=== Post-disaster laws ===
He says that the country needs climate change laws that would likewise address post-disaster rehabilitation and help people and communities rebuild their homes and infrastructure after a calamity.

=== Transport modernization ===
Aquino says he is in favor of the Public Utility Vehicle Modernization Program, but says it also needs to be "humane".

== Social issues ==
Aquino is in favor of the SOGIE Equality Bill and a bill on divorce, but says he has reservations for both.

He says he does not support calls for a reimposition of the death penalty.

On the legalization of medical marijuana, Aquino says he would want to read further studies about the ramifications of such a move in the country.

== The Constitution ==
Aquino is also against any current movement urging changes to the Constitution, including those seeking to amend term limits to national posts. However, he says he approves of extensions of two more years to the three-year term limits for local officials.

== Media ==
Amid debate on the effects of video games on children following the 2026 Tacloban school shooting, Aquino stated that he was against a total ban on video games and supported stricter age restrictions on mature-rated games. Aquino himself is an avid gamer and has previously lobbied in support of the country's video game industry, where he supported the recognition of Filipino gamers as national athletes, which the Games and Amusements Board eventually did in 2017.
