= Usapang Diskarte =

Filipino Youtube channel

- Website type: YouTube channel / Facebook page
- Available in: Filipino
- Country of origin: Philippines
- Users: 252,000 subscribers (YouTube)
- Current status: Closed (since July 15, 2022)

Usapang Diskarte was a YouTube channel known for hosting content allegedly promoting sexual abuse and grooming of minors.

== Channel ==
Usapang Diskarte had at least 252,000 subscribers prior to its shutdown in July 2022. It uploaded roughly 1,000 videos and operated for years.

The Philippine National Police alleged the channel was "connected to a group of sexual predators who equates ‘macho’ with being abusive." The PNP described the channel's contents to include "tips on how to lure a minor to have sex with an older man" where minors are "conditioned into thinking that having sex with an older man is normal".

The administrator of Usapang Diskarte was unknown.

== Response ==
=== Shut down ===
The YouTube channel was shut down by Google on July 14, 2022. Likewise, Meta did the same for Usapang Diskarte's page on Facebook.

=== Investigation ===
The Philippine National Police Anti-Cybercrime Group (PNP-ACG) disclosed that the channel's activities has been under surveillance since March 2022. In July 2022, the law enforcement's efforts was disrupted when the channel was shut down after its videos went viral.

Google and Meta were ordered by court to disclose computer data related to Usapang Diskarte to aid the investigations; orders which were complied by the two companies.

=== Law reform ===
Senator Risa Hontiveros condemned the YouTube channel for its content and cited its exposure as one of the reasons why her bill, the Anti-Online Sexual Abuse or Exploitation of Children (OSAEC) Act which strengthens the current anti-child porn law, must be approved into law.
