= Philippine House Committee on Health =

Standing committee of the House of Representatives of the Philippines

Committee on Health
- 20th Congress

History
- New session started: To convene on July 28, 2025

Leadership
- Chairman: Giselle Lazaro-Maceda
- Minority Leader: Vacant

Website
- Committee on Health

The Philippine House Committee on Health, or House Health Committee is a standing committee of the Philippine House of Representatives.

== Jurisdiction ==
As prescribed by House Rules, the committee's jurisdiction includes the following:

- Public health and hygiene
- Quarantine, medical, hospital and other health facilities and services

== Senate Counterpart ==
The jurisdiction of the House Committee on Health has a counterpart in the Senate:

- Senate Committee on Health and Demography

== Members, 20th Congress ==
As of June 30, 2025, all committee membership positions are vacant until the House convenes for its first regular session on July 28.

== Historical membership rosters ==
=== 18th Congress ===
Position	Members	Party	Province/City	District
Chairperson	Angelina Tan	NPC	Quezon	4th
Vice Chairpersons	Kristine Alexie Besas-Tutor	Nacionalista	Bohol	3rd
Vice Chairpersons	Elpidio Barzaga Jr.	NUP	Cavite	4th
Vice Chairpersons	Ma. Lourdes Arroyo	Lakas	Negros Occidental	5th
Vice Chairpersons	Dahlia Loyola	NPC	Cavite	5th
Vice Chairpersons	Gerardo Espina Jr.	Lakas	Biliran	Lone
Vice Chairpersons	Ruth Mariano-Hernandez	PDP-Laban	Laguna	2nd
Vice Chairpersons	Jose Enrique Garcia III	NUP	Bataan	2nd
Vice Chairpersons	Maricel Natividad-Nagaño	PRP	Nueva Ecija	4th
Vice Chairpersons	Sandra Eriguel	NUP	La Union	2nd
Vice Chairpersons	Resurreccion Acop	NUP	Antipolo	2nd
Members for the Majority	Faustino Michael Carlos Dy III	PFP	Isabela	5th
Members for the Majority	Cheryl Deloso-Montalla	Liberal	Zambales	2nd
Members for the Majority	Ciriaco Gato Jr.	NPC	Batanes	Lone
Members for the Majority	Victor Yap	NPC	Tarlac	2nd
Members for the Majority	Elias Bulut Jr.	NPC	Apayao	Lone
Members for the Majority	Gil Acosta	PPP	Palawan	3rd
Members for the Majority	John Reynald Tiangco	Partido Navoteño	Navotas	Lone
Members for the Majority	Samantha Louise Vargas-Alfonso	NUP	Cagayan	2nd
Members for the Majority	Leo Rafael Cueva	NUP	Negros Occidental	2nd
Members for the Majority	Strike Revilla	NUP	Cavite	2nd
Members for the Majority	Diego Ty	NUP	Misamis Occidental	1st
Members for the Majority	Janice Salimbangon	NUP	Cebu	4th
Members for the Majority	Micaela Violago	NUP	Nueva Ecija	2nd
Members for the Majority	Juliette Uy	NUP	Misamis Oriental	2nd
Members for the Majority	Rashidin Matba	PDP–Laban	Tawi-Tawi	Lone
Members for the Majority	Alfredo Garbin Jr.	AKO BICOL	Party-list	
Members for the Majority	Aleta Suarez	Lakas	Quezon	3rd
Members for the Majority	Ramon Nolasco Jr.	NUP	Cagayan	1st
Members for the Majority	Jose Teves Jr.	TGP	Party-list	
Members for the Majority	Alan 1 Ecleo	PDP–Laban	Dinagat Islands	Lone
Members for the Majority	Emmarie Ouano-Dizon	PDP–Laban	Cebu	6th
Members for the Majority	Ma. Angelica Amante-Matba	PDP–Laban	Agusan del Norte	2nd
Members for the Majority	Cyrille Abueg-Zaldivar	PPP	Palawan	2nd
Members for the Majority	Solomon Chungalao	NPC	Ifugao	Lone
Members for the Majority	Arnold Celeste	Nacionalista	Pangasinan	1st
Members for the Majority	Estrellita Suansing	PDP–Laban	Nueva Ecija	1st
Members for the Majority	Princess Rihan Sakaluran	NUP	Sultan Kudarat	1st
Members for the Majority	Adriano Ebcas	AKO PADAYON	Party-list	
Members for the Majority	Presley De Jesus	PHILRECA	Party-list	
Members for the Majority	Alberto Pacquiao	OFWFC	Party-list	
Members for the Majority	Dulce Ann Hofer	PDP–Laban	Zamboanga Sibugay	2nd
Members for the Majority	Hector Sanchez	Lakas	Catanduanes	Lone
Members for the Majority	Robert Ace Barbers	Nacionalista	Surigao del Norte	2nd
Members for the Majority	Elizalde Co	AKO BICOL	Party-list	
Members for the Majority	Shirlyn Bañas-Nograles	PDP–Laban	South Cotabato	1st
Members for the Majority	Rodolfo Ordanes	SENIOR CITIZENS	Party-list	
Members for the Minority	Stella Luz Quimbo	Liberal	Marikina	2nd
Members for the Minority	Angelica Natasha Co	BHW	Party-list	
Members for the Minority	Irene Gay Saulog	KALINGA	Party-list	
Members for the Minority	Sarah Jane Elago	Kabataan	Party-list	

==== Chairperson ====
- Angelina Tan (Quezon–4th, NPC) July 22, 2019 – October 6, 2020
- Lucille Nava (Guimas–Lone, PDP–Laban) October 6, 2020 – October 13, 2020

==== Members for the Majority ====
- Marissa Andaya (Note: Died on July 5, 2020.) (Camarines Sur–1st, NPC)
- Francisco Datol Jr. (Note: Died on August 10, 2020.) (SENIOR CITIZENS)
- Bernardita Ramos (Note: Died on September 8, 2020.) (Sorsogon–2nd, NPC)

== See also ==
- House of Representatives of the Philippines
- List of Philippine House of Representatives committees
- Department of Health
