= Philippine Senate Committee on Health and Demography =

Standing committee of the Senate of the Philippines

Committee on Health and Demography
- Senate of the Philippines; 20th Congress

History
- New session started: July 28, 2025

Leadership
- Chair: Risa Hontiveros (Akbayan) since June 3, 2026

Structure
- Seats: 13
- Political groups: Majority (8): NPC (3); Akbayan (1); KANP (1); Liberal (1); Nacionalista (1); Independent (1); Minority (5): PDP (3); PMP (1); Independent (1)

The Philippine Senate Committee on Health and Demography is a standing committee of the Senate of the Philippines.

== Jurisdiction ==
According to the Rules of the Senate, the committee handles all matters relating to:

- Public health in general
- Medical, hospital and quarantine services
- Population issues, concerns, policies and programs affecting individuals and their families, and their effects on national, social and economic conditions
- The Philippine Statistics Authority
- The Department of Health and its attached agencies.
- The Inter-Agency Task Force for the Management of Emerging Infectious Diseases (IATF-EID)

== House Counterpart ==
The jurisdiction of the Senate Committee on Health and Demography has counterparts in the House of Representatives:

- House Committee on Health
- House Committee on Population and Family Relations

== Members, 20th Congress ==
Based on the Rules of the Senate, the Senate Committee on Health and Demography has 13 members.

Position	Member	Party
Chairperson	Bong Go	PDP
Senior Vice Chairperson	Vacant	
Vice Chairperson	Risa Hontiveros	Akbayan
President pro tempore	Loren Legarda	NPC
Members for the Majority	Pia Cayetano	Nacionalista
Members for the Majority	Rodante Marcoleta	Independent
Members for the Majority	Ronald dela Rosa	PDP
Members for the Majority	Robin Padilla	PDP
Members for the Majority	Jinggoy Estrada	PMP
Members for the Minority	Bam Aquino	KANP
Members for the Minority	Win Gatchalian	NPC
Members for the Minority	Kiko Pangilinan	Liberal
Members for the Minority	Raffy Tulfo	Independent

Ex officio members:

- Senate President Alan Peter Cayetano
- Senate President pro tempore Loren Legarda

Committee secretary: Horace R. Cruda

== Historical membership rosters ==
=== 19th Congress ===
Position	Member	Party
Chairperson	Bong Go	PDP–Laban
Vice Chairperson	Pia Cayetano	Nacionalista
Members for the Majority	JV Ejercito	NPC
Members for the Majority	Mark Villar	Nacionalista
Members for the Majority	Nancy Binay	UNA
Members for the Majority	Lito Lapid	NPC
Members for the Majority	Imee Marcos	Nacionalista
Members for the Majority	Robin Padilla	PDP–Laban
Members for the Majority	Grace Poe	Independent
Members for the Majority	Bong Revilla	Lakas
Members for the Majority	Raffy Tulfo	Independent
Members for the Majority	Cynthia Villar	Nacionalista
Member for the Minority	Risa Hontiveros	Akbayan

Committee secretary: Horace R. Cruda

=== 18th Congress ===
Position	Member	Party
Chairperson	Bong Go	PDP–Laban
Vice Chairpersons	Pia Cayetano	Nacionalista
Vice Chairpersons	Nancy Binay	UNA
Members for the Majority	Ronald dela Rosa	PDP–Laban
Members for the Majority	Francis Tolentino	PDP–Laban
Members for the Majority	Imee Marcos	Nacionalista
Members for the Majority	Richard Gordon	Independent
Members for the Majority	Panfilo Lacson	Independent
Members for the Majority	Koko Pimentel	PDP–Laban
Members for the Minority	Risa Hontiveros	Akbayan
Members for the Minority	Francis Pangilinan	Liberal

Committee secretary: Beatriz Tiongco-Cruda

== See also ==
- List of Philippine Senate committees
