= Philippine Senate Committee on Electoral Reforms and People's Participation =

Standing committee of the Senate of the Philippines

Committee on Electoral Reforms and People's Participation
- Senate of the Philippines; 20th Congress

History
- New session started: July 28, 2025

Leadership
- Chair: Imee Marcos, NP since May 26, 2026

Structure
- Political groups: Majority (8): NPC (3); Akbayan (1); KANP (1); Lakas (1); Liberal (1); Nacionalista (1); Minority (5): PDP (2); Nacionalista (1); PMP (1); Independent (1)

The Philippine Senate Committee on Electoral Reforms and People's Participation is a standing committee of the Senate of the Philippines.

The committee is responsible for the passing of the Anti-Political Dynasty Bill, which is mandated by the 1987 Constitution. The committee has failed to pass the bill in the last four decades, with the Supreme Court of the Philippines unanimously ruling in 2026 that Congress (the Senate and the House) has a mandatory constitutional duty to enact an anti-political dynasty law, declaring that a 39-year failure to pass the legislation constitutes grave abuse of discretion. The Supreme Court also stated that the proposed ban on political dynasties must be extended to up to the fourth civil degree of familial and spousal relations.

== Jurisdiction ==
According to the Rules of the Senate, the committee handles all matters relating to:

- Election laws and the implementation of the constitutional provisions on initiative and referendum on legislative acts
- Recall of elective officials
- Role and rights of people's organizations
- Sectoral or party-list representation
- The Commission on Elections

== Members, 20th Congress ==
Based on the Rules of the Senate, the Senate Committee on Electoral Reforms and People's Participation has 13 members. |

Position	Member	Party
Chairperson	Imee Marcos	Nacionalista
Vice Chairperson	Risa Hontiveros	Akbayan
Members for the Majority	Jinggoy Estrada	PMP
Members for the Majority	Bong Go	PDP
Members for the Majority	Rodante Marcoleta	Independent
Members for the Majority	Robin Padilla	PDP
Members for the Majority	Mark Villar	Nacionalista
Members for the Minority	Bam Aquino	KANP
Members for the Minority	Win Gatchalian	NPC
Members for the Minority	Lito Lapid	NPC
Members for the Minority	Erwin Tulfo	Lakas

Ex officio members:

- Senate President pro tempore Loren Legarda
- Acting Majority Floor Leader Joel Villanueva
- Minority Floor Leader Tito Sotto

Committee secretary:

- Dana Paula M. Alberto

== Historical membership rosters ==
=== 20th Congress (Until January 26, 2026) ===
Position	Member	Party
Chairperson	Panfilo Lacson	Independent
Vice Chairpersons	Risa Hontiveros (Note: Also served as the deputy minority leader alongside Juan Miguel Zubiri (Independent).)	Akbayan
Vice Chairpersons	Imee Marcos	Nacionalista
Deputy Majority Leaders	JV Ejercito	NPC
Deputy Majority Leaders	Rodante Marcoleta	Independent
Members for the Majority	Bam Aquino	KANP
Members for the Majority	Bong Go	PDP
Members for the Majority	Robin Padilla	PDP
Members for the Majority	Lito Lapid	NPC
Members for the Majority	Kiko Pangilinan	Liberal
Members for the Majority	Win Gatchalian	NPC
Members for the Majority	Erwin Tulfo	Lakas
Deputy Minority Leader	Juan Miguel Zubiri	Independent

Committee secretary: Dana Paula M. Alberto

=== 19th Congress ===
Position	Member	Party
Chairperson	Imee Marcos	Nacionalista
Members for the Majority	JV Ejercito	NPC
Members for the Majority	Mark Villar	Nacionalista
Members for the Majority	Nancy Binay	UNA
Members for the Majority	Ronald dela Rosa	PDP–Laban
Members for the Majority	Bong Go	PDP–Laban
Members for the Majority	Lito Lapid	NPC
Members for the Majority	Loren Legarda	NPC
Members for the Majority	Robin Padilla	PDP–Laban
Members for the Majority	Bong Revilla	Lakas
Members for the Majority	Cynthia Villar	Nacionalista
Members for the Majority	Juan Miguel Zubiri	Independent
Member for the Minority	Risa Hontiveros	Akbayan

Committee secretary: Dana Paula B. Mendiola-Alberto

=== 18th Congress ===
Position	Member	Party
Chairperson	Imee Marcos	Nacionalista
Vice Chairperson	Panfilo Lacson	Independent
Members for the Majority	Nancy Binay	UNA
Members for the Majority	Ronald dela Rosa	PDP–Laban
Members for the Majority	Bong Go	PDP–Laban
Members for the Majority	Koko Pimentel	PDP–Laban
Members for the Majority	Bong Revilla	Lakas
Members for the Majority	Francis Tolentino	PDP–Laban
Members for the Majority	Cynthia Villar	Nacionalista
Members for the Minority	Kiko Pangilinan	Liberal
Members for the Minority	Risa Hontiveros	Akbayan

Committee secretary: Atty. Dana Paula B. Mendiola-Alberto

== See also ==
- List of Philippine Senate committees
