= Philippine Senate Committee on Economic Affairs =

Standing committee of the Senate of the Philippines

Committee on Economic Affairs
- Senate of the Philippines; 20th Congress

History
- New session started: July 28, 2025

Leadership
- Chair: Risa Hontiveros (Akbayan)

Structure
- Seats: 11
- Political groups: Majority (7): Nacionalista (3); NPC (3); Akbayan (1); Minority (4): Nacionalista (1); PDP (1); Independent (2)

The Philippine Senate Committee on Economic Affairs is a standing committee of the Senate of the Philippines.

== Jurisdiction ==
According to the Rules of the Senate, the committee handles all matters relating to:

- Economic planning and programming
- Planning of domestic and foreign public indebtedness
- General economic development
- Coordination, regulation and diversification of industry and investments

== Members, 20th Congress ==
=== Current ===
Following the 2026 Philippine Senate leadership dispute, all leadership positions in the Senate, including committee chairmanships, were vacated.

Risa Hontiveros is the current chairperson for the Committee on Economic Affairs.

=== Since September 10, 2025 ===
Based on the Rules of the Senate, the Senate Committee on Economic Affairs has 11 members.

Position	Member	Party
Chairperson	Camille Villar	Nacionalista
Vice Chairperson	Win Gatchalian	NPC
Deputy Majority Leaders	JV Ejercito	NPC
Deputy Majority Leaders	Risa Hontiveros	Akbayan
Members for the Majority	Pia Cayetano	Nacionalista
Members for the Majority	Loren Legarda	NPC
Members for the Majority	Mark Villar	Nacionalista
Deputy Minority Leaders	Rodante Marcoleta	Independent
Deputy Minority Leaders	Joel Villanueva	Independent
Members for the Minority	Imee Marcos	Nacionalista
Members for the Minority	Robin Padilla	PDP

Ex officio members:

- Senate President pro tempore Panfilo Lacson
- Majority Floor Leader Juan Miguel Zubiri
- Minority Floor Leader Alan Peter Cayetano

Committee secretary: Jamie Lyn Duque-Daileg

== Historical membership rosters ==
=== 19th Congress ===
Position	Member	Party
Chairperson	Juan Miguel Zubiri	Independent
Vice Chairpersons	Loren Legarda	NPC
Vice Chairpersons	Imee Marcos	Nacionalista
Members for the Majority	JV Ejercito	NPC
Members for the Majority	Mark Villar	Nacionalista
Members for the Majority	Nancy Binay	UNA
Members for the Majority	Pia Cayetano	Nacionalista
Members for the Majority	Win Gatchalian	NPC
Members for the Majority	Lito Lapid	NPC
Members for the Majority	Robin Padilla	PDP–Laban
Member for the Minority	Risa Hontiveros	Akbayan

Committee secretary: Jamie Lyn Duque-Daileg

=== 18th Congress ===
Position	Member	Party
Chairperson	Imee Marcos	Nacionalista
Vice Chairpersons	Sonny Angara	LDP
Vice Chairpersons	Win Gatchalian	NPC
Members for the Majority	Pia Cayetano	Nacionalista
Members for the Majority	Lito Lapid	NPC
Members for the Majority	Bong Revilla	Lakas
Members for the Majority	Francis Tolentino	PDP–Laban
Members for the Minority	Francis Pangilinan	Liberal
Members for the Minority	Risa Hontiveros	Akbayan

Committee secretary: Elizabeth F. Agas

== See also ==
- List of Philippine Senate committees
