= Opinion polling for the 2016 Philippine Senate election =

In most polls (surveys) for the Senate, a respondent is given the option to give up to 12 names.

== Voting preferences per candidate ==
In this table, the people that are in the top twelve are boldfaced, while those within the margin of error are italicized.

=== Until filing of candidacies ===
Name and party	Date	Jun 24–Jul 2, 2014	Sep 8–15, 2014	Nov 14–20, 2014	Mar 1–7, 2015	May 30–Jun 7, 2015	Sep 2–5, 2015	
Name and party	Pollster	Pulse Asia	Pulse Asia	Pulse Asia	Pulse Asia	Pulse Asia	SWS	
Name and party	Sample size	1,200	1,200	1,200	1,200	1,200	1,200	
Name and party	Margin of error	±3%	±3%	±3%	±3%	±3%	±3%	
Florencio Abad	Liberal	5.0	5.6	—	—	—	—	
Benny Abante	UNA	—	—	1.9	—	—	—	
Joseph Emilio Abaya	Liberal	—	—	3.5	3.0	4.7	4	
Persida Acosta	Independent	—	—	10.1	7.5	—	2	
Jose Rene Almendras	Liberal	2.7	1.5	—	—	2.9	—	
Rafael Alunan	Independent	—	1.4	1.2	2.3	1.5	—	
Kris Aquino	Independent	—	—	—	—	—	7	
Baby Arenas	Liberal	—	—	1.5	3.3	3.1	—	
Lito Atienza	Buhay	22.1	22.0	26.7	25.3	26.6	—	
Robert "Ace" Barbers	Nacionalista	10.6	10.3	—	—	—	—	
Herbert Bautista	Liberal	32.3	—	—	—	—	—	
Darlene Berabarabe	Independent	—	—	0.7	2.2	0.7	—	
Ruffy Biazon	Liberal	18.4	17.0	18.6	19.6	23.5	—	
Abigail Binay	UNA	—	—	—	—	26.8	—	
Jejomar Binay	UNA	—	—	—	—	—	12	
Teodoro Casiño	Makabayan	—	9.2	9.0	6.9	—	—	
Lino Cayetano	Nacionalista	32.0	27.7	31.3	29.7	36.1	—	
Arnold Clavio	Independent	—	7.9	11.4	8.1	—	—	
Neri Colmenares	Makabayan	2.2	2.6	2.5	2.5	4.1	3	
Miriam Coronel-Ferrer	Independent	—	—	—	—	1.1	—	
Dingdong Dantes	Independent	11.5	11.1	12.8	13.0	15.2	6	
Randy David	Independent	—	—	4.4	4.1	2.7	—	
Rizalito David	Ang Kapatiran	—	—	—	—	—	1	
Leila de Lima	Liberal	28.6	35.3	**33.8**	**36.0**	**38.7**	**33**	
John Carlos de los Reyes	Ang Kapatiran	3.9	—	—	—	—	—	
Jose Manuel Diokno	Independent	—	—	2.8	—	—	—	
Franklin Drilon	Liberal	**44.7**	**42.6**	**44.9**	**44.1**	**45.9**	**42**	
Ace Durano	Liberal	3.6	—	—	—	—	—	
Rodrigo Duterte	PDP–Laban	—	—	—	—	**39.2**	—	
Edgar Erice	Liberal	—	1.7	—	—	—	—	
Leonardo Espina	Independent	—	—	—	—	—	2	
Precy Estrada	Independent	—	—	—	—	16.5	—	
Rodolfo Fariñas	Nacionalista	2.9	2.9	2.3	6.1	—	—	
Janette Garin	Liberal	—	—	—	—	—	3	
Win Gatchalian	NPC	5.0	3.2	8.1	5.8	5.3	10	
Richard J. Gordon	Independent	**45.1**	**45.9**	**42.9**	**35.5**	**39.7**	**29**	
TG Guingona	Liberal	30.8	23.5	31.8	29.8	28.1	23	
Edward Hagedorn	Liberal	20.1	19.6	22.0	—	—	—	
Mujiv Hataman	Liberal	3.0	2.6	3.1	2.9	3.0	—	
Kim Henares	Independent	—	—	—	7.1	—	3	
Ernesto Herrera	Independent	—	—	8.7	—	—	—	
Risa Hontiveros	Akbayan	**32.4**	30.7	**35.4**	**33.1**	27.0	21	
Lorna Kapunan	Aksyon	—	—	—	2.1	—	—	
Princess Jacel Kiram	UNA	—	—	—	—	—	2	
Panfilo Lacson	Independent	**47.1**	**47.1**	**52.9**	**58.3**	**67.4**	**47**	
Rey Langit	UNA	—	—	4.3	3.8	—	—	
Mark Lapid	Aksyon	18.1	15.6	18.2	27.6	22.7	—	
Danilo Lim	Liberal	6.5	4.8	7.3	7.0	6.2	—	
Joey Lina	Independent	—	—	5.1	—	—	—	
Jun Lozada	Independent	4.3	—	4.1	3.9	—	—	
Romulo Macalintal	Independent	—	—	2.6	—	—	—	
Jamby Madrigal	Liberal	**38.2**	**35.9**	**34.9**	**33.1**	33.9	—	
Edu Manzano	Independent	—	—	11.9	—	—	—	
Mitos Magsaysay	UNA	23.2	20.6	21.5	18.9	—	—	
Bongbong Marcos	Independent	**43.8**	**47.2**	**40.5**	**47.2**	**54.2**	**40**	
Lani Mercado	Lakas	—	—	—	—	—	15	
Alma Moreno	UNA	—	—	8.8	—	—	—	
Isko Moreno	PMP	—	24.5	19.6	22.9	23.6	4	
Sergio Osmeña III	Independent	**37.4**	**35.4**	**37.8**	**36.0**	**41.2**	**28**	
Manny Pacquiao	UNA	25.6	31.3	21.9	29.5	**37.6**	**30**	
Francis Pangilinan	Liberal	**54.7**	**51.5**	**49.2**	**44.7**	**46.9**	**40**	
Jericho Petilla	Liberal	—	2.3	2.1	2.1	3.1	2	
Gwendolyn Pimentel	PDP–Laban	18.9	16.8	—	—	—	—	
Juan Ponce Enrile, Jr.	NPC	23.8	20.4	23.6	—	—	—	
Manuel Quezon III	Independent	6.4	—	—	—	—	—	
Miro Quimbo	Liberal	—	—	—	—	—	0.8	
Apollo Quiboloy	Independent (politician	—	—	—	0.2	—	—	—
Amina Rasul	Independent	4.6	4.5	4.8	4.9	—	—	
Ralph Recto	Liberal	**52.7**	**44.1**	**45.1**	**43.9**	**47.6**	**43**	
Danton Remoto	Ladlad	0.6	0.7	0.6	0.4	0.4	—	
Gilbert Remulla	UNA	11.0	11.7	11.3	8.7	7.4	—	
Lani Revilla	Lakas	28.4	21.4	19.0	19.0	19.1	—	
Leni Robredo	Liberal	15.2	20.6	12.4	9.6	13.1	23	
Rufus Rodriguez	CDP	5.4	4.8	4.7	5.2	2.9	4	
Martin Romualdez	Lakas	4.8	2.6	5.8	6.9	5.2	8	
Bernadette Romulo-Puyat	Independent	—	0.8	—	—	—	—	
Roman Romulo	Independent	—	3.3	4.4	3.2	3.3	3	
Harry Roque	Independent	—	—	0.5	0.9	1.2	1	
Etta Rosales	Akbayan	2.1	1.9	—	—	—	—	
Mar Roxas	Liberal	**47.0**	**47.6**	—	—	—	—	
Joey Salceda	Liberal	3.1	4.0	6.0	6.5	—	—	
Vilma Santos	Liberal	—	**44.5**	—	—	—	18	
Shalani Soledad	Liberal	8.9	8.7	—	—	—	—	
Corazon Soliman	Independent	—	11.7	—	—	—	—	
Tito Sotto	NPC	**53.8**	**51.6**	**54.7**	**59.3**	**63.4**	**54**	
Lorenzo Tañada III	Liberal	4.2	4.0	6.4	6.6	6.7	—	
Gilberto Teodoro, Jr.	Independent	—	—	—	—	—	3	
"Niel Tupas" (unspecified)	Liberal	—	3.9	—	—	—	—	
Niel Tupas, Jr.	Liberal	—	—	—	—	—	4	
Francis Tolentino	Independent	12.2	9.7	14.2	15.6	17.8	10	
Reynaldo Umali	Liberal	2.2	—	—	—	—	0.6	
Luis Raymond Villafuerte	NPC	2.4	2.1	—	—	—	—	
Mark Villar	Nacionalista	—	—	—	—	—	**24**	
Joel Villanueva	Liberal	7.4	5.3	8.3	9.2	17.2	12	
Migz Zubiri	Independent	**42.2**	**41.5**	**45.5**	**40.2**	**43.9**	**32**	
Others	—	0.6	—	—	—	—	4	
Don't know	—	0.2	0.1	0.5	0.4	0.1	4	
Refused	—	0.3	0.4	0.3	1.0	0.6	4	
None	—	1.8	1.0	3.6	2.1	0.1	4	

=== Until the campaign period ===
Name and party	Date	Oct 25 to Nov 5, 2015	Nov 28, 2015	Dec 4-11, 2015	Dec 4-12, 2015	Dec 12-14, 2015	Jan 8-10, 2016	Jan 24–28, 2016	Feb 5–7, 2016
Name and party	Pollster	RMN	MBC-DZRH	Pulse Asia	Standard	SWS	SWS	Pulse Asia	SWS
Name and party	Sample size	3,607	7,436	1,800	1,500	1,200	1,200	1,800	1,200
Name and party	Margin of error	±2.5%	±1.14%	±2%	±2.6%	±3%	±3%	±2%	±3%
Shariff Albani	Independent	—	—	—	—	—	01	—	—
Aldin Ali	Independent	—	—	—	05.00	—	01	—	—
Rafael Alunan	Independent	—	04.38	—	—	—	03	—	—
Ina Ambolodto	Liberal	—	02.56	—	—	—	00.8	—	—
Aladon Ampatuan	Independent	—	03.53	—	—	—	—	—	—
Tonyboy Aquino	Independent	—	12.4	—	—	—	—	08.6	—
Levito Baligod	Independent	—	01.90	—	—	—	—	—	—
Greco Belgica	Independent	—	02.29	—	—	—	00.8	—	—
Walden Bello	Independent	—	03.17	—	—	—	02	—	—
Sandra Cam	PMP	—	02.39	—	—	—	02	—	—
Melchor Chavez	LM	—	—	—	06.00	—	08	07.5	—
Neri Colmenares	Makabayan	07.94	09.48	—	07.00	—	06	17.1	—
Leila de Lima	Liberal	**34.91**	**36.27**	**46.80**	**40.00**	**35.00**	**33**	**48.6**	**35**
Franklin Drilon	Liberal	**41.26**	**47.74**	**55.10**	**47.00**	**39.00**	**43**	**58.8**	**40**
Mary Lou Estrada	KBL	—	—	**15.90**	—	12.00	—	—	—
Win Gatchalian	NPC	13.79	19.46	**36.00**	25.00	21.00	17	37.7	23
Richard J. Gordon	Independent	**31.47**	**37.07**	**57.00**	**33.00**	**32.00**	**31**	**48.6**	**26**
TG Guingona	Liberal	21.70	**26.22**	**38.60**	26.00	**28.00**	28	**41.4**	**26**
Rodrigo Gutang	Independent	—	02.27	—	—	—	—	—	—
Risa Hontiveros	Akbayan	**29.16**	**33.81**	35.70	**28.00**	26.00	28	**41.1**	**27**
Dante Jimenez	Independent	—	04.82	—	—	—	—	—	—
Lorna Kapunan	Aksyon	—	04.66	—	—	—	05	—	—
Princess Jacel Kiram	UNA	—	03.98	—	—	—	02	—	—
Panfilo Lacson	Independent	**49.86**	**54.00**	**58.50**	**46.00**	**46.00**	**49**	**63.3**	**49**
Razel Lagman	Independent	—	03.50	—	—	—	—	—	—
Rey Langit	UNA	06.60	10.72	—	05.00	—	05	—	—
Mark Lapid	Aksyon	**24.97**	21.18	20.90	19.00	19.00	19	27.2	19
Dante Liban	Independent	—	01.72	—	—	—	—	—	—
Romeo Maganto	Lakas	—	02.80	—	—	—	03	—	—
Edu Manzano	Independent	18.90	21.38	22.50	19.00	15.00	16	24.5	18
Allan Montaño	UNA	—	04.94	—	05.00	—	06	—	—
Ramon Montaño	Independent	—	04.57	—	—	—	—	—	—
Alma Moreno	UNA	08.88	11.04	—	12.00	13.00	11.1	11.8	—
Isko Moreno	PMP	14.10	18.64	19.20	20.00	**30.00**	28	24.5	—
Getulio Napeñas	UNA	—	03.12	—	—	—	03	—	—
Susan Ople	Nacionalista	06.33	10.12	—	06.00	—	09	09.1	—
Sergio Osmeña III	Independent	**33.88**	**37.89**	**49.80**	**33.00**	**38.00**	**42**	**54.8**	**37**
Manny Pacquiao	UNA	**34.21**	**36.64**	**40.00**	**37.00**	**40.00**	**37**	**46.9**	**35**
Cresente Paez	Independent	—	01.28	—	—	—	00.6	—	—
Samuel Pagdilao	Independent	—	03.06	—	—	—	02	—	—
Jovito Palparan	Independent	—	04.45	—	—	—	03	—	—
Francis Pangilinan	Liberal	**43.62**	**43.33**	**54.50**	**48.00**	**56.00**	**46**	**65.6**	**42**
Jericho Petilla	Liberal	06.88	05.34	—	—	—	03	07.4	—
Ralph Recto	Liberal	**44.34**	**45.98**	**58.90**	**44.00**	**56.00**	**46**	**59.9**	**46**
Martin Romualdez	Lakas	11.76	14.20	21.60	**28.00**	13.00	13	19.1	18
Roman Romulo	Independent	—	06.24	—	—	—	06	—	—
Tito Sotto	NPC	**57.99**	**58.00**	**67.90**	**57.00**	**59.00**	**56**	**68.8**	**52**
Francis Tolentino	Independent	13.24	17.76	23.50	12.00	24.00	19	23.7	19
Joel Villanueva	Liberal	14.04	19.24	29.40	17.00	20.00	19	31.1	22
Migz Zubiri	Independent	**40.18**	**46.97**	**55.90**	**39.00**	**40.00**	**39**	**54.9**	**38**
Others	—	—	—	—	—	—	—	—	—
Don't know	—	08.15	—	—	—	—	03	—	—
Refused	—	—	—	—	—	—	—	—	—
None	—	—	—	—	—	—	—	—	—

=== Campaign period ===
Name and party	Date	Feb 13, 2016	Feb 15–20, 2016	Feb 16–27, 2016	Feb 24–Mar 1, 2016	Mar 30–Apr 2, 2016
Name and party	Pollster	MBC-DZRH	Pulse Asia	Pulse Asia	Standard	SWS
Name and party	Sample size	7,572	1,800	5,200	3,000	1,500
Name and party	Margin of error	±1.13%	±2%	±1.4%	±1.8%	±3%
Shariff Albani	Independent	03.1	3.0	2.6	1	—
Aldin Ali	LM	02.6	2.6	2.5	1	—
Rafael Alunan	Independent	03.2	3.9	3.1	2	—
Ina Ambolodto	Liberal	02.2	3.4	2.9	3	—
Gofredo Arquiza	Independent	02.5	1.0	2.2	1	—
Levito Baligod	Independent	02.3	1.3	1.9	1	—
Greco Belgica	Independent	02.3	0.9	1.8	1	—
Walden Bello	Independent	03.3	2.1	2.8	1	—
Sandra Cam	PMP	02.9	0.8	1.1	1	—
Melchor Chavez	LM	08.6	6.4	8.1	4	6
Neri Colmenares	Makabayan	12.6	13.5	11.1	13	7
Leila de Lima	Liberal	**38.1**	**45.3**	**35.1**	**30**	**31**
Ray Dorona	Independent	02.9	0.6	1.0	1	—
Franklin Drilon	Liberal	**41.2**	**52.4**	**46.5**	**36**	**45**
Larry Gadon	KBL	04.6	1.9	4.1	3	—
Win Gatchalian	NPC	**28.3**	**41.2**	**26.1**	**32**	25
Richard J. Gordon	Independent	**33.4**	**42.6**	**34.9**	**30**	**30**
TG Guingona	Liberal	24.2	**36.7**	**28.2**	**30**	21
Risa Hontiveros	Akbayan	**31.3**	**36.2**	**33.1**	**39**	**30**
Eid Kabalu	Independent	01.9	2.0	1.5	1	—
Lorna Kapunan	Aksyon	04.8	5.0	3.9	3	—
Princess Jacel Kiram	UNA	03.0	2.4	2.3	2	—
Panfilo Lacson	Independent	**53.0**	**60.2**	**44.9**	**36**	**37**
Rey Langit	UNA	08.6	7.7	5.2	3	—
Mark Lapid	Aksyon	20.6	21.5	20.3	19	21
Dante Liban	Independent	02.4	1.2	1.2	1	—
Romeo Maganto	Lakas	03.3	2.8	3.2	2	—
Edu Manzano	Independent	21.8	17.1	19.3	12	16
Allan Montaño	UNA	04.8	3.5	4.8	3	7
Ramon Montaño	Independent	03.2	2.1	2.9	1	—
Alma Moreno	UNA	12.8	11.2	6.7	7	7
Isko Moreno	PMP	15.0	19.2	10.2	25	16
Getulio Napeñas	UNA	03.9	2.5	4.0	2	—
Susan Ople	Nacionalista	08.0	10.2	7.9	5	—
Sergio Osmeña III	Independent	**33.6**	**43.7**	**36.3**	25	**30**
Manny Pacquiao	UNA	**37.9**	**34.8**	**33.2**	**30**	**31**
Cresente Paez	Independent	02.1	0.7	0.8	0.4	—
Samuel Pagdilao	Independent	03.0	1.8	2.0	1	—
Jovito Palparan	Independent	03.7	2.8	2.4	2	—
Francis Pangilinan	Liberal	**42.2**	**54.1**	**47.2**	**43**	**37**
Jericho Petilla	Liberal	03.7	9.1	7.9	7	10
Ralph Recto	Liberal	**43.4**	**53.4**	**43.5**	**43**	**30**
Martin Romualdez	Lakas	17.4	22.0	20.6	**31**	22
Roman Romulo	Independent	05.8	6.5	5.9	4	—
Dionisio Santiago	Independent	04.0	5.3	6.2	3	—
Tito Sotto	NPC	**51.0**	**63.6**	**50.6**	**50**	**42**
Francis Tolentino	Independent	18.0	24.0	20.5	19	24
Diosdado Valeroso	Independent	02.1	0.8	1.1	1	—
Joel Villanueva	Liberal	27.7	**39.1**	**28.5**	**36**	**28**
Migz Zubiri	Independent	**46.6**	**48.5**	**39.4**	**37**	**31**
Others	N/A	N/A	N/A	N/A	N/A	N/A
Don't know	—	—	0.8	—	—	—
Refused	—	—	0.1	—	—	—
None	—	—	1.4	7.8	7	—

=== Seats won ===
In this table, the first figure are seat totals within the top twelve; if a party has any of its members within the margin of error of the twelfth-placed candidate, it is denoted by the second figure inside the parenthesis. Parties that won the majority (7 or more) of the seats contested are boldfaced; those which had the plurality of seats are italicized.

Pollster	Date(s) administered	Sample size	Margin of error	AKB	Lakas	LP	NP	NPC	PDP	UNA	Others	Ind.
**2013 election**	May 13, 2013	40.1 million	NA	0	0	1	3	1	0	3	2	2
Pulse Asia	Jun 24–Jul 2, 2014	1,200	±3%	1	0 (1)	5 (2)	1 (1)	1	0	2	0	2 (1)
Pulse Asia	Sep 8–15, 2014	1,200	±3%	0 (1)	0	6	1	1	0	2 (1)	0	2 (1)
Pulse Asia	Nov 14–20, 2014	1,200	±3%	1	0	4 (1)	1 (1)	1	0	2	0	3
Pulse Asia	Mar 1–7, 2015	1,200	±3%	1	0	4 (1)	1 (1)	1	0	2 (1)	0	3
Pulse Asia	May 30–Jun 5, 2015	1,200	±3%	0	0	3 (1)	1 (1)	1	1	3	0	3
SWS	Sep 2–5, 2015	1,200	±3%	0	0	3	2	1	0	3	0	3
MBC-DZRH	Nov 28, 2015	7,436	±1.14%									
Pulse Asia	Dec 4–11, 2015	1,800	±2%									
Standard	Dec 4–13, 2015	1,500	±2.6%									
SWS	Dec 12–14, 2015	1,200	±3%									
SWS	Jan 8–10, 2016	1,200	±3%									
Pulse Asia	Jan 24–28, 2016	1,800	±2%									

=== Senate composition ===
In this table, the first figure are seat totals within the top twelve; if a party has any of its members within the margin of error of the twelfth-placed candidate, it is denoted by the second figure inside the parenthesis. Parties that won the majority (13 or more) of the seats contested are boldfaced; those which had the plurality of seats are italicized.

Pollster	Date(s) administered	Sample size	Margin of error	AKB	Lakas	LP	NP	NPC	PDP	UNA	Others	Ind.
**2013 election**	May 13, 2013	40.1 million	NA	0	2	4	5	2	1	5	2	3
Pulse Asia	Jun 24–Jul 2, 2014	1,200	±3%	1	0 (1)	6 (2)	4 (1)	2	0	5	2	4 (1)
Pulse Asia	Sep 8–15, 2014	1,200	±3%	0 (1)	0	7	4	2	0	5 (1)	2	4 (1)
Pulse Asia	Nov 14–20, 2014	1,200	±3%	1	0	4 (1)	4 (1)	2	0	5	2	5
Pulse Asia	Mar 1–7, 2015	1,200	±3%	1	0	5 (1)	4 (1)	2	0	5 (1)	2	5
Pulse Asia	May 30–Jun 5, 2015	1,200	±3%	0	0	4 (1)	3 (1)	2	1	6	2	5
SWS	Sep 2–5, 2015	1,200	±3%	0	0	4	5	2	0	6	2	5
MBC-DZRH	Nov 28, 2015	7,436	±1.14%									
Pulse Asia	Dec 4–11, 2015	1,800	±2%									
Standard	Dec 4–13, 2015	1,500	±2.6%									
SWS	Dec 12–14, 2015	1,200	±3%									
SWS	Jan 8–10, 2016	1,200	±3%									
Pulse Asia	Jan 24–28, 2016	1,800	±2%									
