= Risa Hontiveros =

Senator of the Philippines since 2016

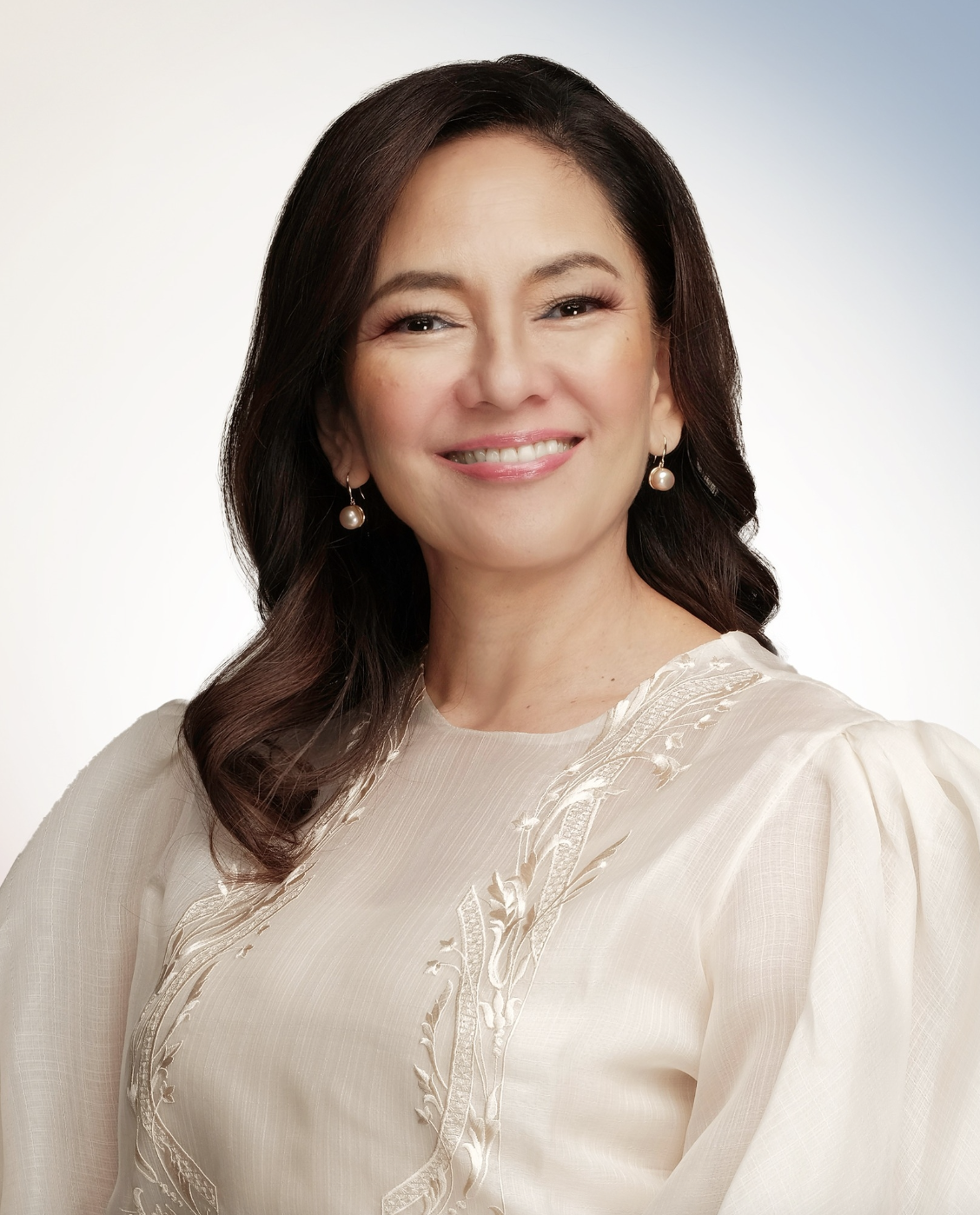
- Official portrait, 2025

Senator of the Philippines
- Incumbent
- Assumed office June 30, 2016
Senate positions
Senate Deputy Majority Leader
In office September 9, 2025 – May 11, 2026 Serving with JV Ejercito
Leader	Juan Miguel Zubiri
Preceded by	Rodante Marcoleta
Succeeded by	Joel Villanueva
Senate Deputy Minority Leader
In office August 3, 2022 – September 8, 2025
Leader	Koko Pimentel; Tito Sotto
Preceded by	Bam Aquino
Succeeded by	Rodante Marcoleta
Chair of the Philippine Senate Committee on Health and Demography
Incumbent
Assumed office June 3, 2026
Preceded by	Bong Go
In office September 9, 2025 – May 11, 2026
Preceded by	Bong Go
Succeeded by	Bong Go
In office July 25, 2016 – February 27, 2017
Preceded by	TG Guingona
Succeeded by	JV Ejercito
Chair of the Philippine Senate Committee on Electoral Reforms and People's Participation
In office January 26, 2026 – May 26, 2026
Preceded by	Panfilo Lacson
Succeeded by	Imee Marcos
Chair of the Philippine Senate Committee on Women, Children, Family Relations and Gender Equality
Incumbent
Assumed office August 5, 2016
Preceded by	Pia Cayetano

Member of the Philippine House of Representatives for Akbayan
- In office June 30, 2004 – June 30, 2010

Personal details
- Born: Ana Theresia Navarro Hontiveros; February 24, 1966 (age 60) Manila, Philippines
- Party: Akbayan (since 1998)
- Other political affiliations: Liberal (2009–2010); Pandayan (1990s)
- Spouse: Francisco Baraquel Jr. (m. 1990; died 2005)
- Relations: Jose Hontiveros (grandfather); Daisy Avellana (aunt); Lamberto V. Avellana (uncle-in-law); Eduardo Hontiveros (uncle); Nita Hontiveros-Lichauco (aunt); Pia Hontiveros (sister); Dondon Hontiveros (cousin); Leah Navarro (cousin); Jose Mari Avellana (cousin); Barbie Almalbis (niece)
- Children: 4
- Education: Ateneo de Manila University (BA)
- Occupation: Politician
- Profession: Journalist
- Website: Official website

Ana Theresia "Risa" Navarro Hontiveros Baraquel ([ˈɾisa ɔntɪˈverɔs]; born February 24, 1966) is a Filipino politician who has served as a senator of the Philippines since 2016. A member of the progressive Akbayan party, she previously served as its party-list representative from 2004 to 2010.

Born to a prominent family in the Philippines, Hontiveros studied social sciences at the Ateneo de Manila University, graduating cum laude in 1987. She worked as a journalist for IBC and GMA Network and became involved in the formation of Akbayan in 1998. As a former secretary-general of the Coalition for Peace, her work in peace negotiations earned her a nomination for the 2005 Nobel Peace Prize.

After being elected to the House of Representatives in 2004, she emerged as a major opposition figure to the administration of Gloria Macapagal Arroyo. During her tenure as a representative, she advocated for the passage of the SOGIE Equality Bill, the Comprehensive Agrarian Reform Law, the Cheaper and Quality Medicines Law, and the Reproductive Health Law.

Hontiveros ran for the Senate twice—in 2010 and 2013—before being elected in 2016, becoming the country's first socialist woman senator. As a senator, she authored and led the passage of the Mental Health Act, the Bangsamoro Organic Law, the Expanded Maternity Leave Law, the Anti-POGO Law, the Safe Streets and Public Spaces Act, the Solo Parents Act, the Foundling Protection Law, and the Philippine Maritime Zones Act, among many other laws. During her first term, she was a vocal critic of the administration of Rodrigo Duterte and condemned his war on drugs. At the same time, she became a target of misinformation surrounding her tenure as a PhilHealth trustee, which was later debunked by fact-checkers.

Hontiveros was reelected in 2022, becoming the only opposition senator to retain her seat, and becoming the de facto leader of the opposition as recognized by former vice president Leni Robredo. In 2025, she managed the successful senatorial bids of Bam Aquino and Kiko Pangilinan. Throughout her political career, Hontiveros has launched numerous investigations that have exposed anomalies and corruption in various sectors, including government, where high-ranking officials have successfully been arrested. Among the investigations she led included those that probed the POGO controversy, the KOJC scandal, the Pharmally scandal, and the Philippine drug war, among others.

== Early life and career ==
Ana Theresia Navarro Hontiveros was born on February 24, 1966, in Manila, to Ramon Pardo Hontiveros, a Panay Visayan lawyer, and Chit Navarro Hontiveros, a Caviteño-Mindoreño Tagalog executive secretary. Raised in Merville, Parañaque, she grew up in a household that encouraged outspoken yet respectful dialogue.

Hontiveros belongs to prominent Filipino families. Her paternal lineage includes Jose Hontiveros, a former senator and associate justice of the Supreme Court of the Philippines, while her aunts and uncles include National Artists Daisy Hontiveros Avellana and Lamberto V. Avellana, Jesuit priest and liturgical music pioneer Eduardo Hontiveros, and Philippine Animal Welfare Society founder Nita Hontiveros-Lichauco. Her siblings include journalists Pia Hontiveros and sustainability executive Ginggay Hontiveros-Malvar, while her extended family includes notable figures such as singer Leah Navarro, Cebu City vice mayor Dondon Hontiveros, and musician Barbie Almalbis.

She attended St. Scholastica's College, where she joined the glee club and participated in musical theater, including Repertory Philippines's production of the The Sound of Music. Encouraged by her mother, she became socially aware at a young age, participating in the 1978 noise barrage for democracy when she was 12 years old, and attending a Nuclear Free Philippines Coalition Symposium during her high school sophomore year, where she organized a campaign against the Bataan Nuclear Power Plant.

In college at the Ateneo de Manila University, Hontiveros became active in the student council, advocating for peace and justice for marginalized communities, and also becoming one of five Filipino students who were accepted for the 12th JAL scholarship program at the Sophia University in Japan. She was also credited as the original recording artist of the song Tanging Yaman, which was composed by her classmate Fr. Manoling Francisco, SJ, in 1986. While studying at Ateneo, she worked as a journalist and became pen pals with Philippine Military Academy cadet Francisco Baraquel Jr., who later became her husband. Hontiveros graduated cum laude with a Bachelor of Arts degree in social sciences in 1987.

After graduation, Hontiveros pursued careers in journalism and teaching. She worked for networks IBC and GMA Network, co-anchoring programs including the Firing Line and Headline Trese, for which she was awarded the 1994 Kapisanan ng mga Brodkaster ng Pilipinas Golden Dove Awards for Best Female Newscaster. In the mid-nineties, she helped form the progressive political party Akbayan, and was asked to represent it in Congress, but she begged off the proposals twice due to family reasons. Hontiveros also served as the secretary-general of the Coalition for Peace, advocating for peace zones and leading discussions on socio-economic reforms in peace talks with the National Democratic Front. For her work, she received the Ten Outstanding Young Men (TOYM) Award for Peace and Advocacy in 2001 and was nominated for the Nobel Peace Prize in 2005. Before the 2004 elections, her peers again convinced Hontiveros to represent Akbayan, which she accepted.

== House of Representatives (2004–2010) ==
Hontiveros first entered politics as the third nominee of the Akbayan party-list in the 2004 national elections. She was one of the prominent opposition figures during the Gloria Macapagal Arroyo administration, especially throughout the height of the Hello Garci controversy, where Arroyo allegedly rigged the recent presidential election to her favor, as recorded in a phone call. Arroyo tasked the police and military forces to undertake activities described by international groups as abuse of authority. In October 2005, Hontiveros filed a case with the aim of ending the series of police brutalities conducted by Arroyo's government.

During International Women's Day in 2006, she was arrested and brought to Camp Karingal in Quezon City without a warrant by civilian-clothed government agents of President Gloria Arroyo. Various lawmakers, including Senator Miriam Defensor-Santiago, have called the arrest illegal. Hontiveros was later released after public outrage and criticisms against the Arroyo administration. Hontiveros afterwards returned to work as an opposition figure and House lawmaker and filed criminal raps, stating that the arrest was "veritable proof [that] the President is bent on violating civil liberties to silence those who simply wish to have the truth exposed."

In 2007, Hontiveros urged the Ombudsman to inhibit during the NBN–ZTE deal corruption scandal case. The case exposed an overpriced contract signed by the Arroyo government with China's ZTE Corporation, amounting to at least $130 million in kickbacks. Arroyo's husband, Jose Miguel Arroyo, and Commission on Elections chair Benjamin Abalos were also found to have been involved in bribery. Hontiveros, as House deputy minority leader, criticized the government and called for the controversial deal to be cancelled. Because of the revelations, Arroyo later scrapped the deal. On the same year, Hontiveros called on the House leadership to launch an investigation on the alleged distribution of 'cash gifts' given by the Arroyo government to congressmen. The public funds were reportedly used as Arroyo's bargain to block impeachment.

In 2008, Hontiveros exposed that under the Arroyo government's 18 "agribusiness" deals with China in 2007, at least one million hectares of Philippine forest land territories would be leased to China for 50 years, an unprecedented violation of the Constitution and the country's national integrity. Hontiveros also criticized President Arroyo's Joint Marine Seismic Undertaking (JMSU) agreement, wherein 148,886 square kilometers of Philippine maritime territory would be interfered and exploited by China. Due to the revelations, the Chinese "agribusiness" deals were later cancelled while the JMSU was not renewed by the government, and later declared as void and unconstitutional by the Supreme Court of the Philippines.

As Akbayan representative in the House, Hontiveros has authored numerous laws, including the Right to Labor Self-Organization Law which expanded the rights of Filipino workers to self-organize, the Cheaper and Quality Medicines Law which drastically lowered the cost of medicines in the country, and the Comprehensive Agrarian Reform Program Extension with Reforms (CARPER) Law which gave thousands of poor Filipino farmers their own agricultural lands, among many others. She also participated in the early pride marches calling for the passage of the anti-discrimination bill (later called the SOGIE Equality Bill). In June 2009, Hontiveros marched with the LGBTQ community to denounce the Commission on Election's decision to not accredit Ladlad, the world's first LGBT partylist.

In November 2009, the Maguindanao massacre occurred, where 58 people (including 34 journalists) were killed in Ampatuan, Maguindanao del Sur. Hontiveros called for justice for the victims, calling the massacre 'an indictment of Arroyo's coddling of impunity for her allies'. Hontiveros also criticized the prime suspect, former governor Andal Ampatuan Jr., who petitioned to post bail. Five suspects were convicted ten years later, with Hontiveros stating that although the masterminds were jailed, the quest for justice continues as several suspects remain at large and attacks on journalists continue to occur.

Hontiveros also began the first ever national House debates on the Reproductive Health Law (RH Law) which was primarily authored by her ally Edcel Lagman in the House of Representatives. Although the proposal did not pass into law due to conservative politicians, the debates ignited a national awareness on the need for such a law.

== Philippine Health Insurance Corporation (2014–2015) ==
In November 2014, Hontiveros was inducted as a trustee of the Philippine Health Insurance Corporation (PhilHealth) board, where she served until October 2015. As a trustee, she pushed for expanded medical benefits and coverage, especially for indigents and senior citizens. Later in 2018, when Hontiveros criticized President Duterte's regime and Chinese foreign policy, various fake news were circulated against Hontiveros about her alleged issues in PhilHealth. The allegations have since been fact-checked as false. Many of the bot accounts spreading the fake news were confirmed as originating from China. Duterte-allied vloggers also proliferated the fake news. Hontiveros was never mentioned in the Commission on Audit ruling mandating perpetrators to return unauthorized bonuses. Additionally, the bonuses in question were released before she was appointed in the PhilHealth board.

== Philippine Senate campaigns ==
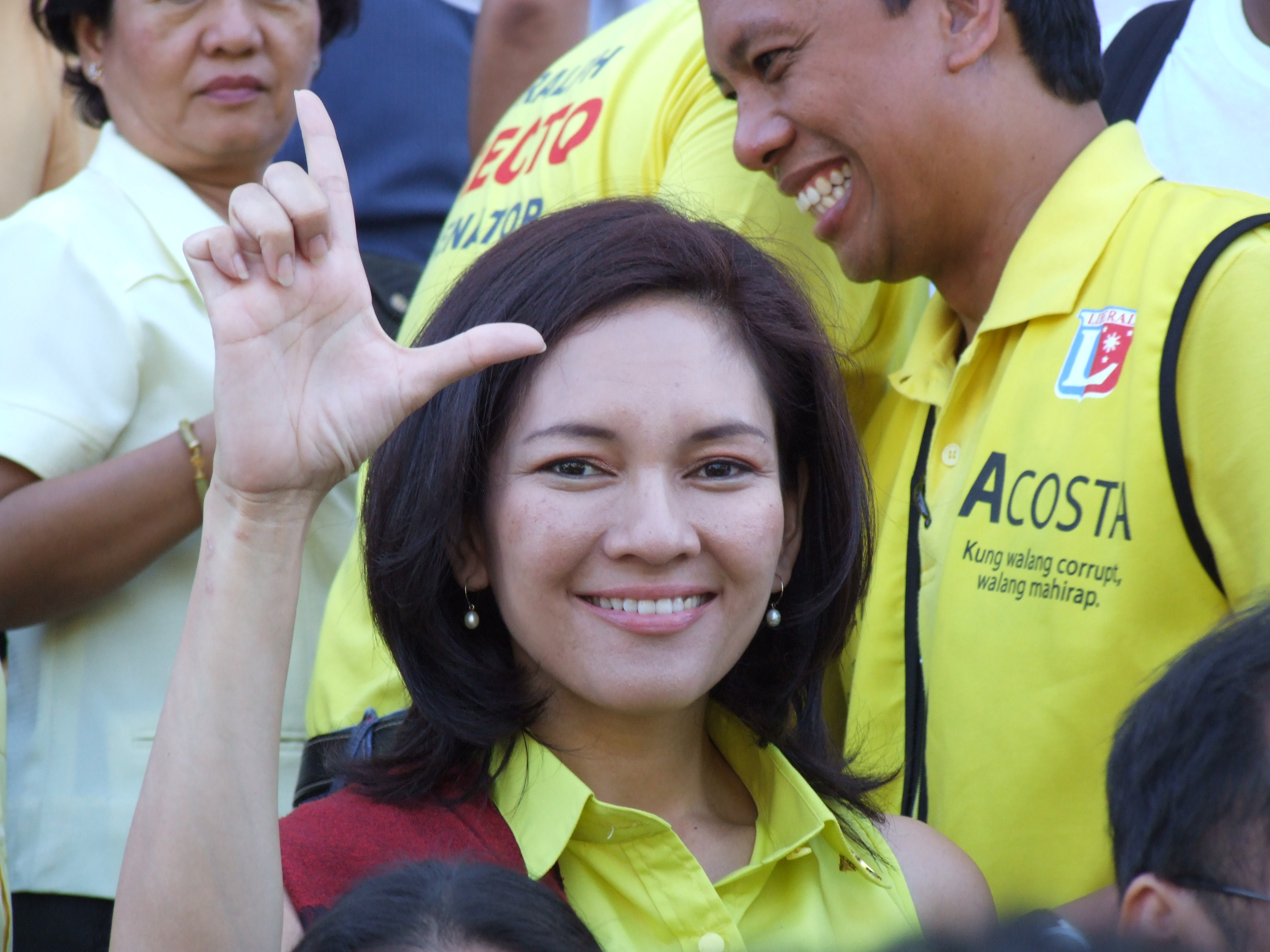
Hontiveros displays Corazon Aquino's laban (fight) hand symbol after joining the Liberal Party in their campaign in the 2010 elections.

=== 2010 ===
Running under the senatorial ticket of then-senator (later president) Benigno Aquino III, Hontiveros lost in the 2010 national elections, placing 13th overall, one place short to be elected. In 2012, Hontiveros called for the abolition of the pork barrel system, which was not necessarily corrupt if used appropriately but have been exploited by corrupt politicians. By the end of the year, the RH Law passed into law. The law mandated an age-appropriate sex education in the Philippines while providing maximum benefits to those with serious and life-threatening reproductive health conditions. Hontiveros has called on the government to fully implement the law amidst opposition from ultra-conservative factions.

=== 2013 ===
Running under President Aquino's Team PNoy ticket, Hontiveros ran again for a senate seat in the 2013 midterm election. However, she lost for the second time, placing 17th in the Senate race. Her campaign slogan was Paglalaban ka, aalagaan ka ("Will fight for you, will take care of you") which reflected the gains from enacting the RH Law and the continuing struggle for universal health care and good governance. In the aftermath, Hontiveros acknowledged Senator Serge Osmeña's observation that her mixed messages in the campaign may have been the reason for her loss. A few days before election day, Senator Miriam Defensor-Santiago endorsed Hontiveros, stating that she “has always respected Hontiveros for her convictions and her willingness to stand for principle.” She also referred to Hontiveros as “someone who has definite views for our country, and who is willing to undergo and make sacrifices, undergo the trials and tribulations of that conviction for our country.”

=== 2016 ===
On October 14, 2015, Hontiveros formally declared her candidacy for senator in the 2016 national elections after public surveys indicated she had a strong chance of winning. She ran under the administration ticket, Koalisyon ng Daang Matuwid. On the May 9, 2016, election, she won, placing ninth. The Commission on Elections proclaimed her victory on ten days later and she took her oath at the Cebu Provincial Capitol the same day.

=== 2022 ===
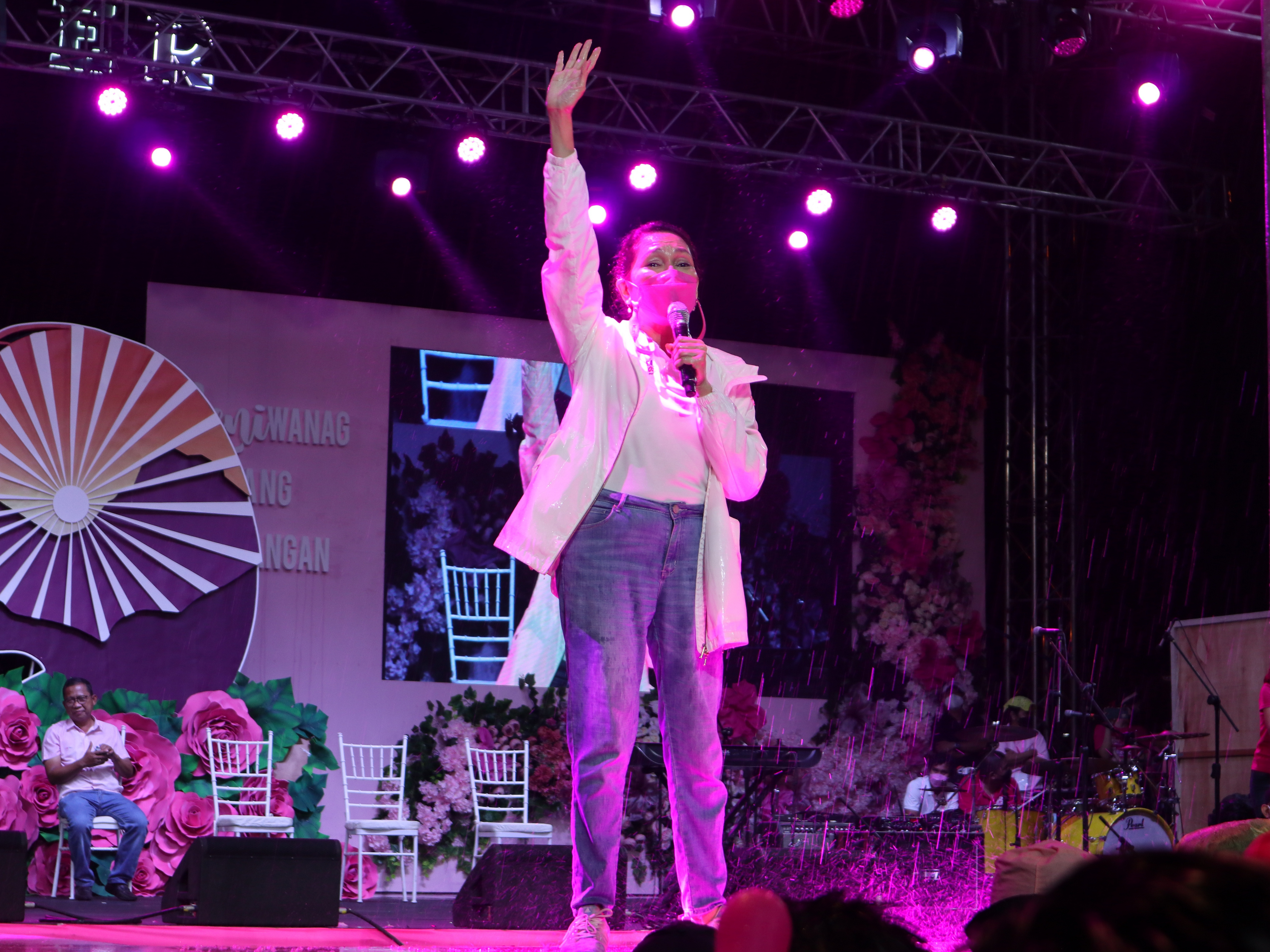
Hontiveros speaks at a Team Robredo–Pangilinan campaign rally in Antipolo in 2022.

Hontiveros sought re-election as a senator in the 2022 election under Team Robredo–Pangilinan, the main opposition ticket. She was also named as a guest candidate of the Labor and Ecology Advocates for Democracy senatorial slate of Leody de Guzman, another presidential candidate. She was successfully reelected for a second term, ranking 11th out of the 12 winning candidates with more than 15 million votes. She was projected to be the only opposition senator in the 19th Congress.

== Senate, first term (2016–2022) ==
=== 17th Congress (2016–2019) ===
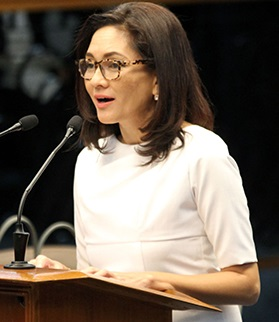
Hontiveros makes her first privilege speech before the Senate in 2016.

As a senator, Hontiveros spearheaded major legislative initiatives. In 2017, she authored the Mental Health Law, which integrates mental health services into the Philippine public health system, ensuring availability in hospitals nationwide. She strengthened the Anti-Hospital Deposit Law in 2017, increasing penalties for hospitals demanding deposits before administering emergency care. Additionally, she authored the Speech Pathology Law, regulating the profession and requiring board examinations.

Hontiveros consistently advocated for gender equality, anti-violence measures, and social protection laws. She filed legislation addressing gender-based violence, harassment, and support for marginalized sectors such as farmers, fisherfolk, indigenous peoples, and informal settlers. She also stood firm on national sovereignty issues, urging President Rodrigo Duterte to assert the Philippines' rights in the South China Sea following the favorable South China Sea Arbitration ruling.

A vocal critic of authoritarianism, Hontiveros opposed the burial of Ferdinand Marcos in the Libingan ng mga Bayani, describing it as a failure to uphold historical justice. She opposed the re-imposition of the death penalty and denounced the 2017 arrest of Senator Leila de Lima, calling it political persecution.

Following the murders of Kian delos Santos, Carl Arnaiz, and Reynaldo de Guzman, Hontiveros vocally opposed President Duterte's drug war. She initiated Senate investigations into the police personnel involved in Delos Santos' killing and provided legal custody for witnesses, shielding them from potential police retaliation. These investigations exposed widespread extrajudicial killings that targeted civilians, including children, with some victims allegedly tortured and intentionally displayed to instill fear in communities. Months later, reports estimated up to 30,000 deaths in Duterte's drug war. The investigations led by Hontiveros and her allies, as well as the reports conducted by veteran journalists, prompted the International Criminal Court to launch an investigation into the alleged crimes. Nine years later, Duterte would be arrested by the ICC and charged with crimes against humanity.

In September 2017, during Senate inquiries, Hontiveros exposed then-Justice Secretary Vitaliano Aguirre II for conspiring to fabricate charges against her. Media captured Aguirre texting instructions to 'expedite' cases through former representative Jacinto Paras, a tactic previously used to arrest Senator Leila de Lima. Despite public backlash and evidence presented in the Senate, Aguirre still pursued charges against her.

That same month, Duterte allies in the House of Representatives slashed the Commission on Human Rights budget to just ₱1,000 (approximately $20) following its criticism of the drug war. Hontiveros joined other senators in negotiating to restore the budget, which was reinstated after widespread public outcry and Senate appeals.

In December 2017, Hontiveros was among the inaugural recipients of the Ripple Awards by LoveYourself, a non-governmental organization recognizing individuals for their significant contributions to raising HIV/AIDS awareness, combating its spread, and reducing stigma in communities.

In 2018, Hontiveros criticized the Duterte administration's foreign policy, calling it a "complete disaster" and a threat to Philippine sovereignty. She cited incidents such as President Duterte's remark suggesting the Philippines could become a "province of China", unauthorized landings of Chinese military aircraft in Davao, the harassment of Filipino fishermen by the Chinese Coast Guard, and the administration's refusal to enforce the South China Sea Arbitration ruling. Her stance drew attacks from pro-Duterte bloggers and bots spreading fake news, prompting fact-checkers and news networks to denounce these tactics.

In April 2018, she filed a Senate resolution calling for a ban on Philippine Offshore Gaming Operators (POGOs) due to their alleged tax evasion and other illegal activities. Despite her efforts, a 2021 Duterte-backed law authored by Pia Cayetano regulated and expanded POGOs instead, effectively legalizing questionable POGO activities in the process.

Hontiveros co-authored the Bangsamoro Organic Law, which formally established the Bangsamoro Autonomous Region in Muslim Mindanao (BARMM) to promote peace in Mindanao. The law was ratified in July 2018. That same month, her proposed amendment to the Magna Carta for Persons with Disabilities, mandating PhilHealth coverage for all PWDs, was passed by the Senate.

In May 2018, Hontiveros condemned the removal of Chief Justice Maria Lourdes Sereno, describing it as a "stab to the Constitution's heart." In August, she filed a resolution to designate August 16 as a "National Day of Remembrance" for victims of extrajudicial killings under the government's war on drugs, marking the anniversary of Kian delos Santos' death.

In September 2018, Hontiveros, alongside opposition senators, called for a Senate probe into President Duterte's revocation of Senator Antonio Trillanes' amnesty, accusing the president of targeting Trillanes for his criticisms. She criticized Duterte as the "real destabilizer" after he accused progressive groups and opposition figures of plotting to oust him, claims that the Armed Forces of the Philippines and police later dismissed.

That same month, Hontiveros exposed a ₱2-billion "tara" (grease payment) system within the National Food Authority under its head, military general Jason Aquino. She also championed legislative efforts to protect public spaces, with the Senate approving her proposed Safe Streets and Public Spaces Act of 2017, which criminalized street harassment. Signed into law in 2019, it was a landmark measure against catcalling and harassment.

In December 2018, her First 1,000 Days Law, aimed at improving maternal and infant health, was enacted. She continued advocating for marginalized groups, receiving the Equality Champion Award in November 2018 for her work on the SOGIE Equality Bill and fight against discrimination.

In January 2019, she spearheaded the passage of the HIV and AIDS Policy Act of 2018, which expanded access to HIV services and testing, earning praise from the World Health Organization. She also filed a bill to legalize divorce in the Philippines, which garnered public support according to a Social Weather Stations survey.

Hontiveros has been a staunch advocate for social justice and progressive legislation. She opposed lowering the minimum age of criminal responsibility and, in 2019, received the Silver Rose Award from Solidar at the European Parliament for her work in promoting social justice and solidarity.

Several key laws she authored or sponsored were enacted in 2019. These include the Special Protection of Children in Situations of Armed Conflict Law, which protects children from recruitment by armed groups, and the Universal Health Care Act, which expands access to health services. She also sponsored the Expanded Maternity Leave Law, which increased benefits for working parents, and co-authored the Pantawid Pamilyang Pilipino Program (4Ps) Law, institutionalizing cash transfers to alleviate poverty.

=== 18th Congress (2019–2022) ===
In July 2019, charges including sedition and obstruction of justice were filed against Hontiveros and other opposition members by the Office of the Solicitor General and the Criminal Investigation and Detection Group. These charges were related to allegations of conspiracy. She was cleared of all charges by the Department of Justice in February 2020.

Hontiveros has also been a consistent supporter of the SOGIE Equality Bill and participated in the 2019 pride parade, which had over 70,000 attendees. Additionally, she advocated for the National Land Use Act to protect agricultural land and the environment, and called for the full implementation of the Reproductive Health Law to address health issues, including the increasing prevalence of HIV.

In December 2019, Hontiveros exposed that the National Grid Corporation of the Philippines (NGCP) did not only allow Chinese nationals to “exercise leadership and management roles” within its ranks but it also awarded 43 contracts to Chinese firms under Duterte. She also raised alarm after discovering that under Duterte, the NGCP is now 40-percent owned by the State Grid Corporation of China.

In February 2020, Hontiveros initiated a Senate investigation that exposed the "pastillas scam", a scheme within the Bureau of Immigration allowing Chinese nationals to enter the Philippines illegally in exchange for bribes. It was revealed that the masterminds amassed up to ₱40 billion through this operation. While President Duterte claimed to have fired those involved, media reports later uncovered that the officials were reinstated.

In 2020, she also highlighted other significant issues. Hontiveros pushed for investigations into illegal activities in Pampanga's Clark Freeport Zone, including Chinese-linked prostitution, and called for a probe into the murder of Anakpawis chairman Randall Echanis. She urged the Department of Health to reinstate the suspended special risk allowance for healthcare workers during the COVID-19 pandemic and advocated for legislation such as the "Magna Carta for Seafarers" and the establishment of medical schools in state universities.

Hontiveros consistently opposed China's territorial claims in the South China Sea, urging the government to act against Chinese aggression and sever ties with Chinese firms involved in military activities on Philippine territories. She also criticized President Duterte's absolute pardon of U.S. Marine Joseph Scott Pemberton, convicted of killing trans Filipina Jennifer Laude, calling it an insult to the Filipino people and the LGBTQ+ community.

In November 2020, Hontiveros sought a Senate probe into irregular deals surrounding the controversial 2019 SEA Games, especially the questionable P9.5 billion in taxpayer money used to construct the overpriced main sports venue inside New Clark City, which has been flagged previously, along with a cauldron worth P50 million, by independent media investigations. However, her proposed investigation was blocked by senator Pia Cayetano, sister of then Taguig representative Alan Peter Cayetano who spearheaded the SEA Games organizing committee. Later in 2026, the National Bureau of Investigation would launch an independent investigation about the alleged irregularities.

In 2021, Hontiveros sought a Senate investigation onto the trafficking of Filipino women in the Middle East and launched the Healthy Pinas Mobile Clinic network, which brought free medical services to underserved communities nationwide.

In February, she filed a bill which would provide free 144 dialysis sessions for senior citizens once passed by the Senate, and also sought for the passage of the teenage pregnancy bill amid a rise in teenage pregnancies during the pandemic. She also filed the Anti-Online Sexual Abuse and Exploitation of Children bill or Anti-OSAEC bill which sought to strengthen the protection of children against online sexual abuse and exploitation.

In April, Hontiveros criticized Duterte for being a coward and traitor amid issues concerning the West Philippine Sea. In May, she sought for the establishment of guidelines to protect delivery riders and freelance workers from unfair practices.

In June, she urged the DND to study restructuring the AFP with more maritime forces, while again pushing for the declaration of July 12 as West Philippine Sea victory day. In July, she sought a probe on the environmentally-destructive Dumaguete reclamation that was opposed by residents.

In August 2021, Senator Hontiveros, alongside Senator Dick Gordon, spearheaded a Senate investigation into the Pharmally scandal. The inquiry exposed anomalies in multi-billion peso contracts awarded to Pharmally Pharmaceutical Corporation for pandemic supplies, allegedly backed by President Rodrigo Duterte and his Chinese adviser Michael Yang. Despite resistance from the Duterte administration, which barred allies from cooperating and launched a counter-investigation, Hontiveros remained vocal about the corruption uncovered during the hearings.

In September, she echoed calls for the need for better emergency plans to address distance learning woes in the post-pandemic era. In December 2021, Hontiveros warned against allowing 100% foreign ownership of telecommunications companies, citing national security risks.

In January 2022, her Prohibition of Child Marriage Law was enacted, making child marriage illegal nationwide. In April 2022, the Marawi Siege Victims Compensation Act, which she co-sponsored, provided financial aid and recovery assistance for citizens affected by the Marawi siege.

Other landmark laws authored or co-authored by Hontiveros include the Foundling Recognition and Protection Act, passed in May 2022, granting rights to abandoned children, and the Expanded Solo Parents Welfare Act, which became law in June 2022, mandating government support for solo parents.

== Senate, second term (2022–present) ==
=== 19th Congress (2022–2025) ===
On June 27, Hontiveros became the de facto leader of the opposition after she took her oath of office before outgoing vice president Leni Robredo at the Quezon City Reception House. Robredo emphasized that opposition leadership had been transferred to Hontiveros, who is the highest-elected opposition figure.

During the 19th Congress, she became part of the two-member Senate minority bloc alongside Koko Pimentel, who was elected as Minority Floor Leader. On August 3, 2022, Pimentel named her as Senate Deputy Minority Leader. Hontiveros chairs the Senate Committee on Women, Children, Family Relations and Gender Equality. In this capacity, she successfully pushed for the passing of the Safe Streets and Public Spaces Act, which protects Filipinos (especially women) from catcalling, groping, persistent requests, and other forms of street harassment.

In January 2023, Hontiveros revealed that Filipinos were being trafficked to Cambodia for crypto scams by a Chinese mafia group aided by officials from the immigration bureau. A few months before, her Senate investigations also found that Chinese groups were trafficking Filipinos in Myanmar. The investigations have led to the rescue of multiple Filipino victims.

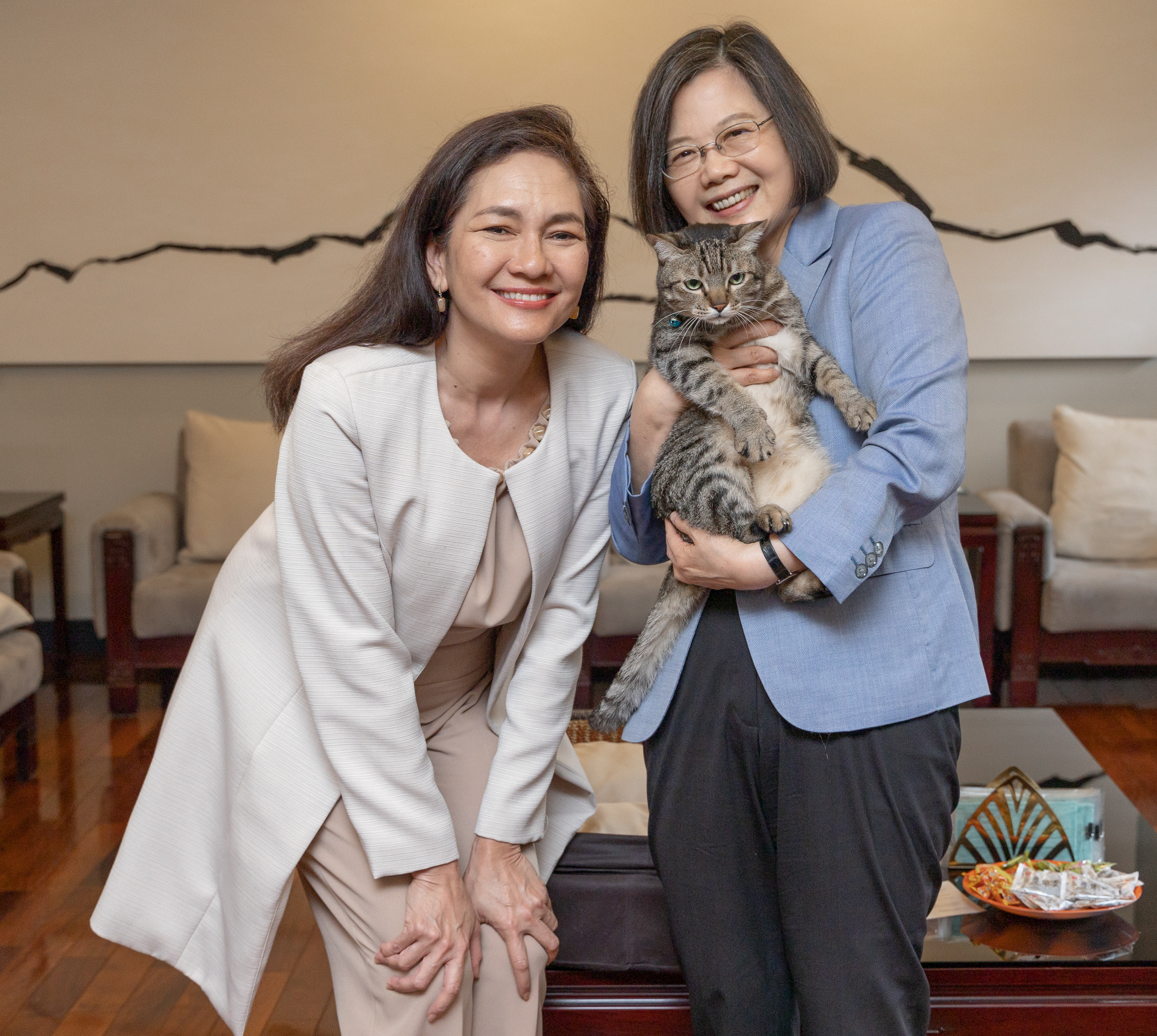
Hontiveros with Republic of China (Taiwan) president Tsai Ing-wen and her pet cat Think Think during a visit to Taipei in May 2023

In May 2023, Hontiveros visited Taipei, Taiwan, to meet with President Tsai Ing-wen and foreign minister Joseph Wu amid China's perceived aggression in the region. She became the first sitting Philippine government official to visit the country, with which the Philippines does not maintain official diplomatic relations due to its adherence to the One China policy, since transportation secretary Mar Roxas in 2011. Hontiveros also visited Overseas Filipinos in Taiwan whom she stated were potentially affected by Chinese Ambassador Huang Xilian's anti-Taiwan independence statements in the Philippines. Hontiveros stressed the importance of adopting a "peaceful approach" in resolving the South China Sea dispute and expressed her dedication to engaging in diplomatic, legal, and "respectful" negotiations with all relevant states "to advance peace and stability in the entire South China Sea." On the same month, Hontiveros voted against the Maharlika Investment Fund, stating that while she believed that the country needed a new form of public financing, proposing a sovereign wealth fund was premature and more suitable in the medium term once the Philippine economy has commodity-based surpluses or surpluses from external trade from state-owned enterprises.

In June 2023, she again rallied her allies during the 2023 pride march, calling for the passage of the SOGIE Equality Bill. The march was attended by over 110,000 participants, becoming the largest pride march in Southeast Asia. In July 2023, Hontiveros filed a resolution urging the government to declare July 12 as West Philippine Sea Victory Day, in commemoration of the Philippine victory in the South China Sea Arbitration case. In September 2023, during a budget hearing, Hontiveros grilled the ₱500 million (US$8.8 million) confidential fund sought by Vice President Sara Duterte for her office operations. On the same month, a separate investigation in the House found that Duterte spent ₱125 million ($2.2 million) in confidential funds from her previous budget in only 11 days. Hontiveros has criticized the vice president's spending spree which utilized millions of pesos in confidential funds. On November 7, after a series of Senate investigations led by Hontiveros exposed a religious cult in Socorro that physically, emotionally, and sexually abused locals, notably children, the government formally filed cases against the cult's leaders, saving multiple child victims in the process. On the same month, Hontiveros filed a resolution urging the government to cooperate with the drug war investigations of the International Criminal Court (ICC). In January 2024, following Chinese officials' response to Filipino officials congratulating Taiwan over its elections, Hontiveros voiced her support for the reviewal of the One China policy, stating that "China has done far worse things in our territories compared to a congratulatory message to Taiwan."

In March 2024, Hontiveros led a Senate investigation on Apollo Quiboloy, leader of religious cult Kingdom of Jesus Christ (KOJC) and a close ally of former president Rodrigo Duterte. The investigations concluded that Quiboloy, accused of sexual trafficking and sexual abuse, had abused numerous minors, including children, throughout his cult's operations, and has also committed money laundering. The cult leader is also wanted in the United States for illegal activities. Arrest warrants were afterwards issued by the Senate and the Department of Justice. Former president Duterte and his daughter, Vice President Sara Duterte, aided Quiboloy to avoid arrest, but failed after Quiboloy was arrested a month later.

In July 2024, Hontiveros appealed to the government again to fast-track the reparations for Filipino victims of sexual slavery during the Japanese occupation, also known as "comfort women". Many of the victims were just children, majority were girls while some were boys, when they were sexually enslaved and gang-raped on a daily basis by the Japanese Imperial Army, composed of male adults. Hontiveros filed a measure in the Senate regarding the matter in 2023, citing the recent 2023 ruling from the United Nations-CEDAW which favored the Filipino victims. Japan falsely claimed that the issue was resolved by the 1952 Treaty of San Francisco, which it "interprets" as settlement for all its war crimes. The treaty does not mention the "comfort women" system and many other atrocities that were publicized after the 1952 treaty signing. Many atrocities were intentionally covered-up by Japan after the war, including its human experimentations and live human vivisections against Filipinos and other Asian nationals, resulting to the non-mention of these crimes in the treaty. No Filipino "comfort woman" has ever been compensated through reparations. Additionally, it was impossible for the 1952 treaty to include "comfort women" and human experimentation victims as the treaty was signed 5 decades before the first Filipino "comfort woman" victim, Rosa Henson, came out to the public due to rampant victim-blaming in 1992, and more than 6 decades before Japan's human experimentation on Filipinos was confirmed by a Japanese veteran involved in the crimes who finally made an overdue confession in 2006.

In August 2024, Hontiveros urged the government to take China to international court after China's continued aggressive actions in the South China Sea. On the same month, Hontiveros sought to realign the "improper" ₱10 million (US$175,290) book fund request of Vice President Sara Duterte, after it was found that the personal book of Duterte would be published and distributed nationwide using public funds.

In October 2024, after the House Quadcom committee confirmed the existence of a reward system created by the previous Duterte government for extrajudicial killings, as well as the existence of a Duterte-sponsored death squad, the Senate launched its own investigations. Hontiveros was the lone senator who confronted former president Duterte in the hearing about his role in the death of young Filipinos such as Kian delos Santos, which later confirmed the remorseless brutalities and killings conducted by Duterte and his previous government. As the hearing progressed, Duterte, on record, accidentally admitted the existence of his death squad and revealed that all his previous police chiefs, including Senator Bato dela Rosa, were heads of his group. On the same month, Hontiveros amplified her push to pass the Magna Carta of Children bill, while also pushing the DFA to provide more humanitarian aid to enter Gaza and calling for the opening of more humanitarian corridors in Palestine, adding that “no human being deserves to suffer through this violence.”

In November 2024, the Philippine Maritime Zones Act and the Archipelagic Sea Lanes Act, authored by Hontiveros, were passed into law. The measures added codification on the country's exclusive economic zone and established the three official international sea lanes of the country, both adding protections to Philippine national territory and security. On the same month, Hontiveros expressed support for the redistribution of wealth during a Rolling Stone interview, stating that "it just makes economic sense." She tied such policies to building support amongst the poor for democracy.

In December, Hontiveros voted against the bill liberalizing the lease of private lands to foreigners, citing national security concerns and the rights of local farmers. She also sponsored for the passage of the Magna Carta of Children. In January 2025, Hontiveros called on electric corporation Meralco to refund ₱100 billion ($1.7 billion) in overcharges before franchise renewal. Due to pressure, Meralco refunded ₱19.9 billion ($340 billion), with Hontiveros welcoming the move while acknowledging that the giant corporation still needs to make a full refund for the millions of workers affected by their unjustifiable prices. Hontiveros also denounced the disinformation campaign targeting the proposed Prevention of Adolescent Pregnancy Act, which seeks to address and reduce the rising teenage pregnancies in the country. She also sought to enhance the Anti-Espionage Law, after a Chinese spy was caught by the government. In February, she sought to certify the wage hike bill for workers across the country.

In March, she welcomed the arrest of former president Duterte by the International Criminal Court for crimes against humanity, calling it "a step toward justice". Hontiveros also sought the help of national agencies to bring back Filipinos who were trafficked by Chinese syndicates in Myanmar. A few weeks later, hundreds of Filipino victims were rescued in Myanmar, where it was confirmed that they were tortured and enslaved by Chinese men. After speaking with the victims, Hontiveros called again for a global action against human trafficking.

Hontiveros managed the joint senatorial campaign of former senators Bam Aquino and Kiko Pangilinan for the 2025 midterm elections. Both were elected to the Senate, strengthening the opposition bloc in the 20th Congress. Akbayan, the party-list of which Hontiveros co-managed the campaign, topped the party-list elections, winning the maximum three seats in the House.

In June 2025, Senator Hontiveros criticized the months of delay in the impeachment proceedings against Vice President Duterte, calling the delay a 'betrayal of constitutional duty'. Both Hontiveros and Pimentel pushed for the opening of the impeachment trial, which led to the Senate impeachment court's convening on June 10. However, the articles of impeachment were returned by the Senate majority, led by then pro-Duterte senator Francis Escudero, to the House of Representatives, delaying the impeachment proceedings further.

==== POGO investigations ====
As early as April 2018, Senator Hontiveros already filed a Senate resolution calling for a ban on Philippine Offshore Gaming Operators (POGOs) due to alleged tax evasion and other illegal activities. However, her calls came unheeded after then President Duterte certified as urgent and signed the POGO Law of Senator Pia Cayetano in 2021, which effectively legalized POGO activities in the country instead.

In May 2024, Senator Hontiveros, along with Senator Win Gatchalian, led a Senate inquiry on Bamban mayor Alice Guo (or Guo Hua Ping) over the town executive's dubious Filipino citizenship status and links to POGOs in her town which was raided for involvement in suspected illicit activities. POGOs were previously regulated by the previous administration of President Rodrigo Duterte, who allowed POGOs to operate near Filipino military bases, likened by Filipino security experts as a "trojan horse". The series of investigation on Guo was highly publicized by the mainstream media and gave a limelight to the numerous illegal activities of Chinese-owned POGOs, which includes fake citizenships, murders, torture, illegal detentions, drug use, prostitution, slavery, and money laundering, among many others. It was also revealed that Michael Yang, the Chinese economic adviser of President Duterte involved in the Pharmally scandal, was part of the POGO criminal activities. Arrest warrants were issued against Guo and her associates. Guo afterwards escaped to Indonesia, but was later caught by local police and imprisoned back to the Philippines. Guo, who was initially suspected by Hontiveros as a spy, was later confirmed as a Chinese spy by She Zhijiang, a former Chinese spy now jailed in Thailand, who also confirmed that Chinese espionage work in the Philippines was intensified beginning in 2016 during the pro-China pivot of former president Duterte. Senator Hontiveros has called on President Marcos to formally ban POGOs in numerous occasions, a call which was later heeded.

In January 2025, Hontiveros called for an enhanced anti-espionage law. On the same month, she voted against a bill which provided Filipino citizenship to Chinese national Li Duan Wang, an incorporator of the biggest POGO provider. Despite her efforts, the bill was still passed by the Senate. Hontiveros called on President Marcos to veto it, where the president later relented and vetoed the bill.

In March 2025, she exposed that at least three "deported" POGO Chinese bosses known for illegal activities did not arrive in China, raising possible collusion between immigration officials. In June 2025, the court legally found that Guo is "undoubtedly" Chinese, and later voided her Philippine birth certificate by October. The NBI also filed 70 criminal cases against Guo and her kin.

The Anti-POGO Law, filed by Hontiveros, was also passed in the Senate and enacted into law. The landmark measure banned and declared illegal all offshore gaming operations in the Philippines (POGOs) and other related activities brought about by the said industry. Guo and her associates were later convicted of qualified human trafficking.

=== 20th Congress (2025–2028) ===
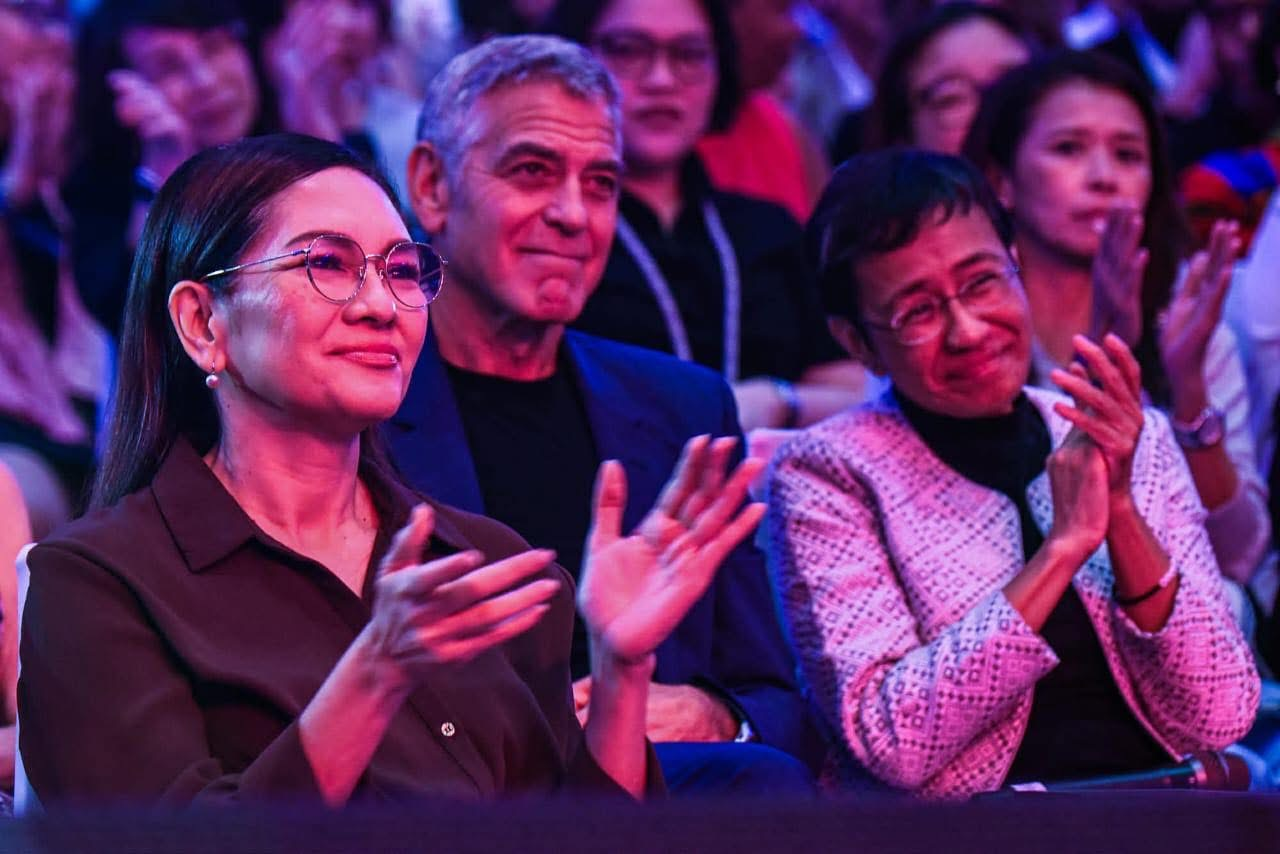
Hontiveros attends Rappler's Social Good Summit with George Clooney and Maria Ressa in Pasay in November 2025

Upon the opening of the 20th Congress in July 2025, Hontiveros remained in the Senate minority bloc and was reappointed as a deputy minority leader by Senator Tito Sotto, who was elected as the new Minority Floor Leader. On September 8, 2025, she voted to oust Escudero as Senate President, replacing him with Sotto. As a result, she became a member of the new Senate majority bloc. A day later, she was named as a deputy majority floor leader, alongside Senator JV Ejercito, and the new chaiperson of the Senate Committee on Health and Demography.

During the months-long flood control project controversy investigations which began in August 2025, Hontiveros questioned how select contractors were able to corner projects and escaped blacklisting, such as the case of the Discaya family's corporations. Hontiveros, while backing the order of President Marcos for lifestyle checks among officials, also echoed the call for the President to undergo a lifestyle check himself, and to reveal his statement of assets, liabilities, and net worth.

Hontiveros also exposed that only 2 of 254 flood control projects in Quezon City were approved because of the failures from the Department of Public Works and Highways (DPWH) to coordinate with the local government. She also exposed the existence of ghosts projects in Metro Manila where at least two projects amounted to more than 100 million pesos, while criticizing DPWH officials for tampering and destroying corruption evidences. During the Senate investigations, the Discayas accidentally revealed that their corrupt practices with the DPWH which got them billions of pesos began in 2016 during the administration of former president Rodrigo Duterte. The exposé was backed by documents presented in a separate House investigation. Hontiveros lauded the public for scrutinizing the corruption scandal and pushed for "zero tolerance". Amid the public outrage, and revelations where some senators and congressmen were involved in the corruption scandal, the Senate leadership shifted, and pro-Duterte senator Rodante Marcoleta was replaced by senator Panfilo Lacson to chair the Senate blue ribbon investigations. Marcoleta criticized Lacson as the investigations found corruption connections with the Duterte administration. Marcoleta also insisted on the declaration of the Discaya couple as "state witnesses" and be granted protection on the expense of the government, despite them not meeting the requirements.

Hontiveros welcomed an independent probe for the flood control project anomalies and other related corruption cases, while pushing for the re-alignment of corruption-prone DPWH funds into public healthcare. Due to the investigations, independent groups estimated that at least 1 trillion pesos were stolen by politicians and their allies through flood control projects, election campaign "donations", and other related means. In September 21, Hontiveros was among the few senators who rallied with more than 100,000 protestors during the Trillion Peso March, a nationwide protest in response to the flood control controversy.

In October, journalist Anthony Taberna falsely claimed that Hontiveros illegally inserted billions of pesos in the 2025 budget. His claim was afterwards utilized by Duterte trolls and vloggers to spread fake news against Hontiveros. Respected veteran journalists in the Philippines criticized Taberna's claims. Hontiveros has denied any bicameral insertions. Verified documents showed that Hontiveros was actually one of only two senators in the 19th Congress who voted "no" to the 2025 bicameral budget report, which was largely supported by pro-Duterte senators, refuting Taberna's claims. Taberna later recanted his claims, stating that he never said Hontiveros was corrupt, adding that Duterte supporters misrepresented his statements. Public investigations later revealed that Taberna was the first celebrity endorser of Stronghold Insurance Corp., where its director was the wife of pro-Duterte senator Rodante Marcoleta, and the insurance provider of the flood control project controversy-linked Discaya family.

In November, Hontiveros filed the Anti-Political Dynasty Bill. She also applauded the conviction of Chinese spy and POGO-backer Alice Guo for qualified human trafficking, stating that "justice has been served". In December, she welcomed the Supreme Court's ruling which affirmed justice for drug war victim Kian delos Santos.

In January 2026, Hontiveros was elected as the new chairperson of the Senate Committee on Electoral Reforms and People's Participation, with the goal of finally passing an Anti-Political Dynasty Bill, as well as the Independent People's Commission (IPC) bill and amending the Party-list System Act. She led several on-the-ground anti-political dynasty bill consultation forums in key cities and provinces across the Philippines, which further galvanized the bill's approval in the Senate committee-level. On the same month, she again condemned the overseas unilateral military strikes of the US, calling it grave violations of international law.

After the Chinese embassy criticized and sent waves of coordinated attacks against Filipino defense officials, Hontiveros denounced the Chinese officials involved, and called for a Senate resolution against the Chinese embassy, citing Article 41 of the Vienna Convention on Diplomatic Relations. The resolution was later adopted by the Senate and criticized by the Chinese embassy in February. Hontiveros fought back, along with multiple senators, and defended the resolution, stating that they will not be silenced by foreign actors. She also renewed her call for the passage of the West Philippine Sea Education bill. Hontiveros afterwards visited Pag-asa Island in the Kalayaan Group of Islands (KIG), reaffirming support for the country's territorial integrity, delivering necessary aid to the island residents, and vowing livelihood and medical assistance. On the same month, the Philippine Geriatric Center (PGC) Act was passed. The law, authored and sponsored by Hontiveros, establishes the PGC, a specialized tertiary hospital aimed at strengthening health services for senior citizens and the country's growing aging population.

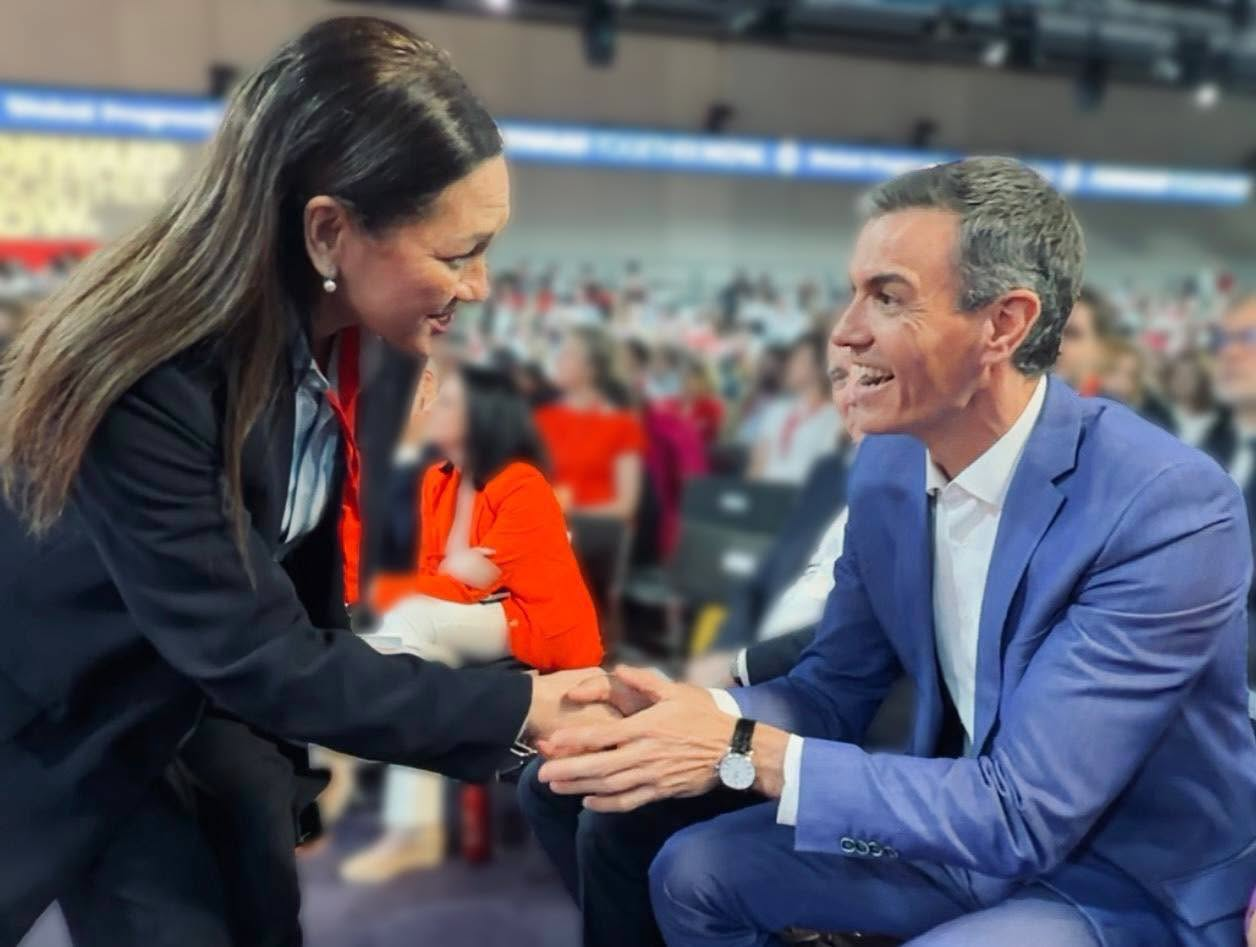
Hontiveros meets Spanish prime minister Pedro Sánchez in Barcelona in April 2026

In March, Hontiveros was one of only four senators, later seven, who signed the Senate Blue Ribbon Committee report on flood control scandal, which recommended investigations into individuals, including three former senators, linked to alleged anomalous flood control projects. Nine signatures were needed for the report to come into effect. Pro-Duterte senators chose not to sign as some of their allies were involved in the scandal. On the same month, Hontiveros also filed a resolution to probe the country's contingency measures for Overseas Filipino Workers affected by recent Middle East conflicts, while calling again for immediate ceasefires, de-escalation, and a return to the negotiating table among the involved parties to resolve the root causes of the crisis. She has also backed calls to allow Palestinian refugees to enter the Philippines. Additionally, the Autism Care and Inclusion Act, sponsored by Hontiveros, which establishes a national plan to improve care, services, and inclusion for persons with autism spectrum disorder, was passed in the Senate. The DOH Hospital Bed Capacity and Service Capability Rationalization Act, authored and sponsored by Hontiveros, which allows the faster expansion of government hospital capacity, was also passed. Additionally, she opposed the adoption of the Senate resolution for extrajudicial rendition which she said ignores the cry for justice from thousands of victims of the bloody drug war.

In April 2026, Hontiveros spoke at the Global Progressive Mobilisation meeting in Barcelona, Spain, where progressive leaders from various countries gathered. Hontiveros shared common calls with Spanish prime minister Pedro Sánchez, Brazilian president Luiz Inácio Lula da Silva, and former Palestinian prime minister Mohammad Shtayyeh. In her speech, she emphasized the importance of defending democracy and strengthening public institutions, stating that democracy must be felt in the daily lives of ordinary citizens. Later that month, Hontiveros, one of only two senators, vocally backed the impartial probe of the Commission on Human Rights regarding the Toboso encounter in Negros Occidental.

On May 11, 2026, after the House of Representatives voted to impeach Vice President Sara Duterte for the second time, the pro-Duterte senators in the Senate staged an ouster against Senate president Tito Sotto and elected Alan Peter Cayetano as the new Senate president, allegedly to control the upcoming impeachment trial's narrative. Hontiveros became part of the new minority bloc after voting for the unseated Senate president Sotto. As a result, she relinquished her position as Deputy Majority Floor Leader and committee chairmanships which were declared vacant due to the reorganization. Under pressure due to a slim majority, the second impeachment of Sara Duterte was convened by the new Senate leadership. Following days of impasse, including Cayetano's refusal to go to work and an allegedly staged shooting incident organized by the Cayetano-led majority to help Senator Ronald dela Rosa escape a warrant of arrest from the International Criminal Court, the minority led by Senator Sherwin Gatchalian successfully ousted Cayetano through the Avelino v. Cuenco ruling and other precedence on June 3, leading to Gatchalian's election as Senate president pro tempore and later as Senate president. In the aftermath, Hontiveros, a vocal critic of the Cayetano bloc, regained the health and women's committee chairmanships and gained the economic affairs committee chairmanship as part of their group's comeback.

On July 1, 2026, Hontiveros launched a Senate investigation into the Tacloban school shooting, where two minors were allegedly influenced by the international online terrorist organization 764, known for its nihilistic violent extremism (NVE). Prior to the investigation, fake news circulated on social media claiming that Hontiveros called for a total ban on online games such as GoreBox, leading to false criticisms. Records showed that the temporary ban on GoreBox was first suggested by Interior Secretary Jonvic Remulla and was mandated by the Cybercrime Investigation and Coordinating Center instead, not Hontiveros. During the Senate investigation, intelligence agencies across the government and international organizations confirmed Hontiveros's suspicions that 764 was involved in the case. The investigations found that the group groomed and radicalized children internationally, and their presence in the Philippines was confirmed, and that they had likely been operating locally. The shooting incident has also been viewed by cyber security experts as the group's first ever "completed attack" anywhere in the world, making the Philippines their testing ground. The Philippine National Police also revealed that a total of 24 Filipino minors had been rescued from the influence of the online extremist group.

On July 6, Hontiveros was among the 21 senators present during the commencement of the impeachment trial of Sara Duterte, which is expected to last for months. On the same month, the Agricultural Cooperatives Act, authored by Hontiveros and institutionalizes the formation of agricultural and fisheries cooperatives and the creation of a dedicated bureau, was passed in the Senate. After the Senate committee reorganizations officially concluded which handed the electoral reforms committee to detained senator Jinggoy Estrada, Hontiveros continued to push the Senate to resume debates for the passage of the anti-political dynasty bill.

In August 2026, Hontiveros sought a Senate investigation about Pax Silica, while magnifying the rights of the indigenous Aeta people of Tarlac to their ancestral lands. On the same month, the Extended Anti-Hospital Detention Bill, principally sponsored by Hontiveros, was passed in the Senate. The measure prohibits medical facilities from detaining patients and human remains because of unpaid hospital bills. In September 2026, the Safeguarding Against Grooming, Inducement and Predation, and Building Accountability for Technology-Facilitated Abuse or Exploitation (SAGIP BATA) Act, principally-authored and sponsored by Hontiveros, was passed in the Senate. The measure protects minors from all forms of sexual violence, abuse, and exploitation, whether committed online, offline, or a combination of both, including online sexual abuse and exploitation of children (OSAEC), child sexual abuse or exploitation materials (CSAEM), and nihilistic violent extremism (NVE). Additionally, Sandy's Act, principally-authored and sponsored by Hontiveros and establishes protection mechanisms for children within the country's tourism industry, was passed in the Senate. Later that month, four hospital bills of Hontiveros were passed in the Senate, establishing the Subic General Hospital and Zamboanga Sibugay Medical Center, and upgrading Bukidnon General Hospital and Kalinga Provincial Hospital (Northern Cordillera Regional Medical Center).

== Political positions ==
A progressive and socialist, who has also been characterized as a social democrat, and referred by political analysts as the “Iron Lady of the Progressive Movement” noted for conviction politics, progressive leadership, and pragmatic coalition building, Hontiveros advocates for policies such as progressive taxation which would reduce tax burdens for the poor and the masses and increase tax for billionaires, improving labor rights, a comprehensive education and support for students and teachers, an independent foreign policy, as well as progressive social policies, including strengthening LGBTQ rights, the rights of farmers, fisherfolks, children and the youth, women, indigenous peoples, informal settlers, senior citizens, the urban poor, and the working masses. She has pushed for the increase of national wages, the legalization of anti-political dynasty measures and legalizing divorce, better anti-espionage laws, and a review on policies that would help the public in lowering water and electricity bills, as well as medical bills. She advocates for fiscal cohesion, expanded government support for cooperatives and micro-enterprises, the saturation of renewable energies, and a national reduction of value-added taxes (VAT), combined with specific tax exemptions and excise tax suspensions, as well as the cutting of systems loss VAT. She opposes China's aggressive expansionism in the West Philippine Sea, the death penalty under a flawed system, contractualization, mining and other environmental destructions, Duterte's ineffective drug war, and charter change. She has also sought for the strengthening of regional ties with ASEAN, and global democratic-progressive leaders.

== Personal life ==
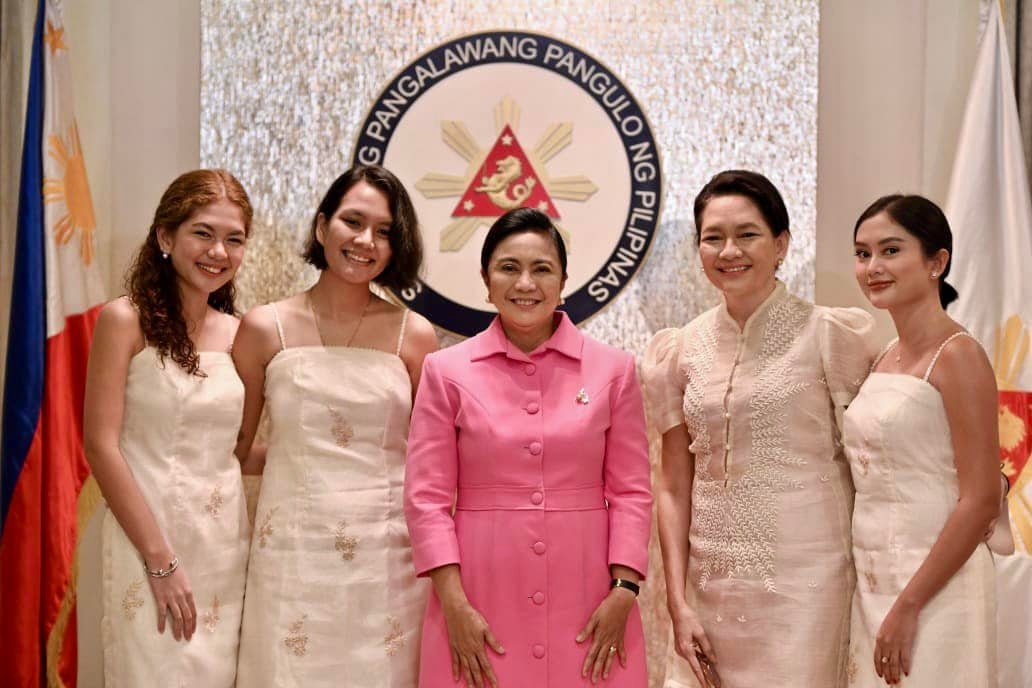
Hontiveros (second from the right) and her daughters meet with then-vice president Leni Robredo (center, in pink) in 2022.

Hontiveros married Francisco Baraquel Jr., a Bicolano captain in the Philippine Constabulary, military officer, and former editor-in-chief of The Corp at the Philippine Military Academy. Their relationship began through letters after Baraquel read Hontiveros' essay in her St. Scholastica yearbook. They became pen pals while Hontiveros was a working student at the Ateneo de Manila University and an activist, and Baraquel was a cadet at the Philippine Military Academy. They married in 1990 and had four children. Francisco died in 2005 of a heart attack caused by severe asthma, leaving Hontiveros to raise their children as a single parent.

Hontiveros, a licensed scuba diver and former teacher at Ateneo, is also an animal welfare advocate. She has adopted multiple stray dogs and cats, including an aspin from the Philippine Animal Welfare Society, the organization founded by her aunt, Nita Hontiveros-Lichauco.

== Family ==
Spouse

- Francisco Baraquel Jr. (1990 - May 2005) (his death, 4 children)

Children

- Issa Hontiveros Baraquel
- Sinta Hontiveros Baraquel
- Kiko Hontiveros Baraquel
- Ianna Hontiveros Baraquel

Parents

- Ramon Pardo Hontiveros
- Chit Navarro

Relatives

- Pia Hontiveros (Sibling)
- Luis Hontiveros (Nephew)
- Vicenta Ruiz Pardo (Grandparent)
- Ma-an Hontiveros (Cousin)
- Jose Mari Avellana (Cousin)
- Jose Hontiveros (Grandparent)
- Barbie Almalbis (Niece)
- Ginggay Hontiveros (Sibling)
- Leah Navarro (Cousin)
- David Hontiveros (Cousin)
- Dondon Hontiveros (Cousin)
- Leon Pedrosa Miraflor (Great Grandparent)
- Leon 'Lenny' Pardo Hontiveros (Uncle)
- Nita Hontiveros-Lichauco (Aunt)
- David Hontiveros (Sibling)
- Ana Hontiveros (Sibling)
- Mon Hontiveros (Sibling)
- Lamberto H. Avellana Jr. (Cousin)
- Eduardo Hontiveros (Uncle)
- Daisy Avellana (Aunt)

== Electoral history ==
Electoral history of Risa Hontiveros
Year	Office	Party	Votes received				Result
Year	Office	Party	Total	%	P.	Swing	Result
2004	Representative (Party-list)	Akbayan	852,473	6.70%	3rd	—N/a	Won
2007	Representative (Party-list)	Akbayan	466,448	2.91%	7th	-3.79	Won
2010	Senator of the Philippines	Liberal	9,106,112	23.87%	13th	—N/a	Lost
2013	Senator of the Philippines	Akbayan	10,944,843	27.26%	17th	+3.39	Lost
2016	Senator of the Philippines	Akbayan	15,915,213	35.38%	9th	+8.12	Won
2022	Senator of the Philippines	Akbayan	15,420,807	27.76%	11th	-7.62	Won

== Awards and recognition ==
- 1994 Kapisanan ng mga Brodkaster ng Pilipinas Golden Dove Awards for Best Female Newscaster
- 2001 Ten Outstanding Young Men (TOYM) Award for Peace and Advocacy
- 2005 Nobel Peace Prize nomination
- 2007 Bayi Citation for Exemplary Leadership in Politics and Governance
- 2017 Love Gala Ripple Award for HIV-AIDS awareness
- 2018 Lagablab Network Equality Champion Award
- 2019 Solidar Silver Rose Award for social justice
- 2022 APCOM Shivananda Khan Award for Extraordinary Achievement
- 2022 PeopleAsia's Women of Style and Substance
- 2023 Red Whistle Ally for Change Award
- 2023 National Bahaghari Champion Award
- 2023 Ateneo Government Service Award for exemplary public service
- 2024 PFIP's Ally of the Year
- 2025 PeopleAsia's People of The Year
- 2025 PDI Women of Power Award
- 2025 Hans T. Sy Award for Autism Inclusion and Welfare
- 2026 St. Scholastica PAX Award

Political offices
House of Representatives of the Philippines
New title	Member of the House of Representatives from Akbayan; 2004–2010; Served alongside: Etta Rosales & Mario Aguja (2004–2007), Walden Bello (2007–2010)	Succeeded by Walden Bello
