= Anti-Political Dynasty Bill =

Proposed law in the Philippines

The Anti-Political Dynasty Bill is a proposed legislation in the Philippines regulating the eligibility of elected politicians to mitigate the prevalence of political families or "political dynasties" at a national level.

== Background ==
=== Basis ===
The 1987 Constitution provides a provision "banning political dynasties". However, there is no enabling law and hence political families remain prominent in Philippines politics. The members of the Constitutional Commission who framed the constitution included this provision due to political dominance of the Marcos family and local clans during the Marcos dictatorship under President Ferdinand Marcos Sr..

Efforts to pass an Anti-Political Dynasty Bill has been in place since the 8th Congress which began in 1987. Seven administrations of presidents later, no anti-dynasty bill has yet to be passed.

In 2026, the Supreme Court of the Philippines unanimously ruled that Congress (the Senate and the House) has a mandatory constitutional duty to enact an anti-political dynasty law, declaring that a 39-year failure to pass the legislation constitutes grave abuse of discretion. The Supreme Court also stated that the proposed ban on political dynasties must be extended to up to the fourth civil degree of familial and spousal relations.

=== Scope ===
An has been proposed to prohibit family members of incumbent officials from seeking public office at least up to the second degree of consanguinity or affinity. But there has been proposals as extensive as up to the fourth degree.

There was concerns on how the bill would apply if incumbent politicians encourages their mistresses or relatives of their unwed partners to run for office.

The constitutional ban on political dynasties is usually proposed through dedicated bill in the Congress; both at the House of the Representatives and Senate level. There is at least one attempt to implement it as part of another proposed measure – Omnibus Election Code of 1993 or Senate Bill No. 1427 of Senator Raul Roco which had the relevant anti-dynasty proposal included as a rider.

Nevertheless, the provision is partly implemented however with the Republic Act 10742 or the Sangguniang Kabataan (SK) Reform Law already barring candidates with up to second civil degree of consanguinity to an incumbent official from contesting for an election in the Sangguniang Kabataan or youth councils. The Bangsamoro Election Code also prohibits political dynasties in the Bangsamoro autonomous region.

== Reception ==
=== General ===
The prevalence of political families in the Congress is seen as an obstacle in the passage of an Anti-Political Dynasty Bill. In December 2025, a national survey showed that 54% of Filipino supports the anti-political dynasty bill. 27% were undecided, and 18% were against it. Metro Manila leaned the most towards the measure, with 69% backing the bill, 20% undecided, and 11% against. In the rest of Luzon, the figure stands at 59% support, 26% undecided, and 15% against, while in the Visayas, support is at 59%, undecided is 23% and against is 18%. Lastly, Mindanao garnered 38% undecided, 34% support, and 27% against. The data showed a majority of support in the national population, and even in regions where support is lacking, majority are not necessarily against the measure.

=== Presidents ===
President Corazon Aquino has discouraged relatives to run in the 1988 Philippine local elections. She said she would not veto an anti-political dynasty bill, signaling her support for anti-political dynasty measures. She raised however that it would be unfair that such bill would disqualify the candidacy of political rival Danding Cojuangco merely due to her within the fourth degree of consanguinity.

President Fidel Ramos backed anti-political dynasty proposals during his administration, but no law was enacted due to strong opposition from political dynasties which formed a majority in Congress. In contrast, President Joseph Estrada vocally defended dynasties and established his own. President Gloria Macapagal Arroyo leaned in favor of dynasties, stating that since there is no law against political dynasties yet, dynasties in effect are legal despite the Constitution being against it.

President Noynoy Aquino was keen on enacting anti-political dynasty measures during his term, tagging the measures as priority legislation. However, strong opposition from politicians originating from political dynasties, who were the majority in Congress, blocked the advancement of a national anti-political dynasty bill. Despite this, the Aquino administration was able to enact one of its anti-dynasty priority legislations, namely the Sangguniang Kabataan (SK) Reform Act (RA 10742) in 2016, the first law in Philippine history to have provisions banning political dynasties. The law prohibited relatives of incumbent officials from running for SK posts.

President Rodrigo Duterte initially claimed that he supported a ban on political dynasty but is skeptical if an anti-dynasty law will get passed in Congress. He claims the Duterte family was "forced" to govern Davao City saying that political dynasties flourish because the public desires so. However, Duterte and his family's actions largely contradict his previous anti-political dynasty statements. By 2019, in the height of his administration, 80% of the governors, 67% of congressmen, and 53% of mayors who won office and backed by his government belonged to “fat dynasties”. Analysts have called the phenomenon as unmatched anywhere in the world. Additionally, Duterte continued to back the widening of his own family's influence, later supporting his daughter's 2022 run for the vice presidency, as well as his grandchildren's 2025 electoral ambitions in various local positions, expanding further his own “fat dynasty”.

President Bongbong Marcos, who was initially not keen on backing the anti-political dynasty bill, later supported it in 2025. The controversial House version which allows simultaneously political members to run in office was authored by House Speaker Bojie Dy and Sandro Marcos was passed on final reading. It's been branded as a "fake anti-dynasty bill". In the Senate, the bill moved forward only after the Senate Committee on Electoral Reforms and People's Participation was chaired by Senator Risa Hontiveros in January 2026. As chair, Hontiveros led several on-the-ground anti-political dynasty bill consultation forums in key cities and provinces across the Philippines, the first time a nationwide consultation campaign was launched for the anti-political dynasty bill, which led to the bills passage in the Senate committee-level in February 2026. Although the full-blown anti-political dynasty bill that Hontiveros was strongly pushing was not accepted by her colleagues, her committee's "workable" version was still met positively as it bans successions and bars multiple political members from running in office. According to De La Salle University Tañada-Diokno School of Law Dean Julio C. Teehankee, numerous senators were trying to block even the Senate committee bill version by putting their names for interpolation, and later not attending the session, thus preventing the bill's passage. This blockade escalated after the Senate shake-up led by senators Alan Peter Cayetano, Pia Cayetano, Imee Marcos, and their pro-Duterte faction in May 2026, which ousted senator Hontiveros as chair. The Cayetanos were later ousted themselves, but no new chair has been elected yet in the Senate committee on electoral reforms as of June 2026. After the committee reorganizations officially concluded, Jinggoy Estrada was elected as the new chair in the Senate committee on electoral reforms in July 2026 even though Estrada was already detained in prison due to plunder charges. Despite the setback, Hontiveros continued to push the Senate to resume debates for the passage of the anti-political dynasty bill.
