= Knights of Rizal =

Order of Chivalry from the Philippines

Knights of Rizal Orden de Caballeros de Rizál Mga Maginoo ni Rizal
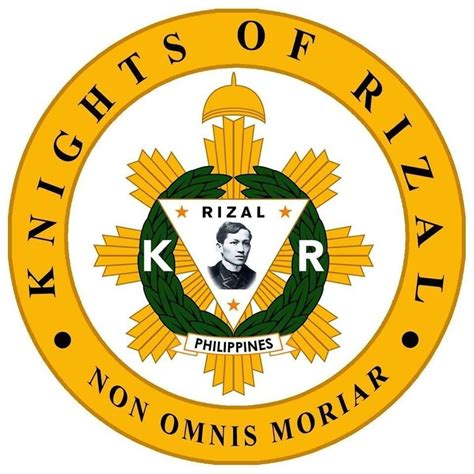
- Badge of the Knights of Rizal with the name of the Order and the motto circumscribed

Awarded by The Supreme Council of the Knights of Rizal
- Type: Order of chivalry
- Established: 1911; 115 years ago; chartered by Congress in 1951; 75 years ago
- Country: Philippines
- Seat: Port Area, Manila
- Motto: Non Omnis Moriar
- Eligibility: Men of legal age with good moral character and reputation, irrespective of nationality, race, social status, or religion
- Awarded for: Outstanding services to the Order or the Philippines, or a demonstrated commitment to the Rizalian ideals of education, service, internationalism, and social justice
- Status: Currently constituted with legislative charter
- Founder: Colonel Antonio C. Torres (1911); President Elpidio Quirino (1951 charter)
- Supreme Commander: Sir Emmanuel Franco Calairo, KGCR
- Grades: Knight Grand Cross of Rizal (KGCR); Knight Grand Officer of Rizal (KGOR); Knight Commander of Rizal (KCR); Knight Officer of Rizal (KOR); Knight of Rizal (KR)
- Website: knights-of-rizal.ph

Statistics
- Total inductees: 25,000+ knights in approximately 200 chapters around the world

Precedence
- Next (higher): Awards and decorations of the Armed Forces of the Philippines and Presidential Medal of Merit
- Next (lower): Decorations of the Reserves and Auxiliaries of the Armed Forces of the Philippines, Philippine National Police, and Coast Guard
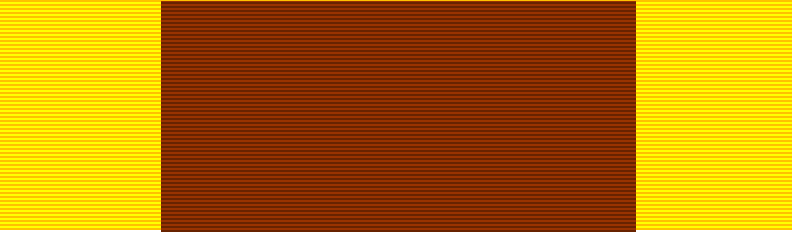
- Ribbon bar

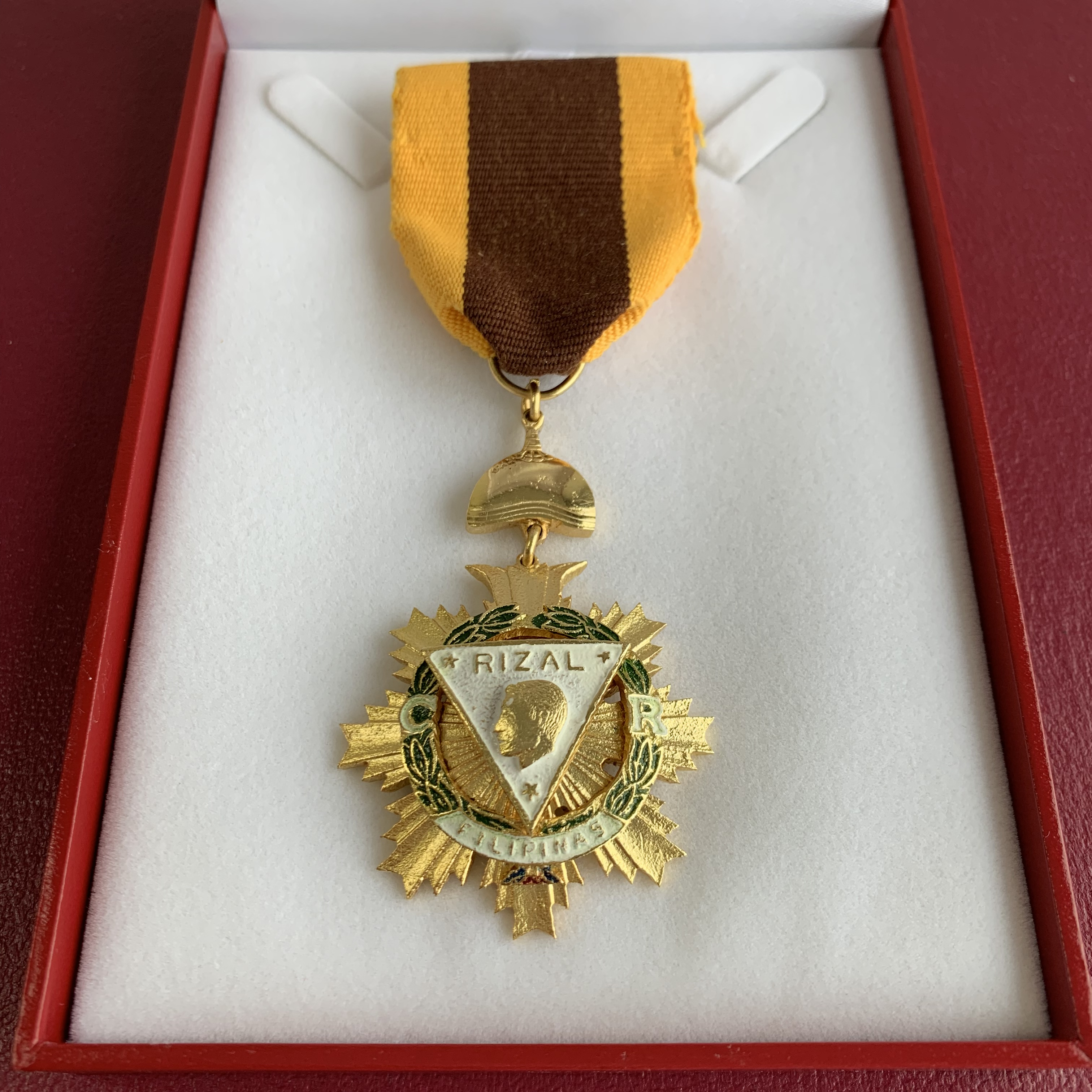
Knight (KR) Insignia

The Knights of Rizal (Spanish: Orden de Caballeros de Rizál; Filipino: Mga Maginoo ni Rizal; sometimes abbreviated as KOR) is an order of chivalry of the Philippines, created to honor and uphold the ideals of the de facto Philippine national hero José Rizal. Knighthood confers a personal title (Sir) and its status, as well as any professional affiliation to the Order, is protected by law against impersonation or fraud. The insignia of the Knights of Rizal is ranked seventh in the Order of Wear pursuant to the Implementing Rules and Regulations of the Honors Code of the Philippines, and is often worn by members of the Philippine government and diplomatic corps.

The Order was established in 1911 by Colonel Antonio C. Torres, who later served as the first Filipino chief of police of Manila. The Order was granted a legislative charter by President Elpidio Quirino as a non-sectarian, non-partisan, civic, patriotic, and cultural organization under Republic Act 646 on June 14, 1951. Although not a state order, it is the one order of knighthood in the Philippines officially recognized and endorsed by an official act of the national government, and its awards and titles are recognized by the Honors Code of the Philippines as official awards of the Republic.

Since its founding, the Order has grown to more than 25,000 members belonging to 131 active chapters in the Philippines and 61 active chapters around the world. Its international headquarters is located on Bonifacio Drive in Port Area, Manila.

== History ==
The Order of the Knights of Rizal was first organized out of a group of nine men by Manila Police Chief Colonel Antonio C. Torres on Rizal Day, December 30, 1911, to commemorate the martyrdom of José Rizal against the Spanish Empire. This group of founding members included Sir Martin P. de Veyra (a pensionado who graduated from the Massachusetts Institute of Technology and worked for the Philippine Assembly), Sir Jose A. del Barrio (a Bureau of Internal Revenue employee), and Sir Jose S. Galvez (a lawyer, stage actor, and the President of Talca, a dramatic guild).

A year later, on December 30, 1912, a state funeral was held to transfer Rizal's remains from his family's house in Binondo, Manila for a wake in the Ayuntamiento and finally a burial in Luneta. The Knights of Rizal kept vigil during the wake and acted as honor guards during the subsequent burial. Asunción López Bantug, Rizal's sister's granddaughter, recounts how the event took place in her biography of Rizal published in 1982:

On December 29, 1912, the urn containing the remains was borne in solemn procession from the family's house to the Ayuntamiento, that fine Marble Hall that had been a symbol of Spanish sovereignty in the Philippines. In the salon of the Ayuntamiento, the urn was enshrined on a magnificent catafalque surrounded by innumerable floral wreaths, offerings of the nation. Throughout that night, the Knights of Rizal and other patriotic groups as well as the public kept vigil round the catafalque. Next morning, December 30, 1912 -- sixteenth anniversary of the martyrdom -- the urn was borne to the Luneta on an artillery caisson drawn by six horses. Thousands joined the procession and thousands more lined the streets.

Since then, the Order has led commemorations of Rizal's birth anniversary and has played a prominent role during Rizal Day ceremonies commemorating his death anniversary. On the 100th anniversary of the state funeral, the Order joined the President of the Philippines, Sir Benigno Aquino III, and the National Historical Commission of the Philippines, in leading the country through the reenactment of the 1912 funeral march. The knights wore a replica of their 1912 uniform and marched alongside a motorized caisson. Around 7,000 students, soldiers, policemen, government employees, and descendants of Rizal joined the commemoration.

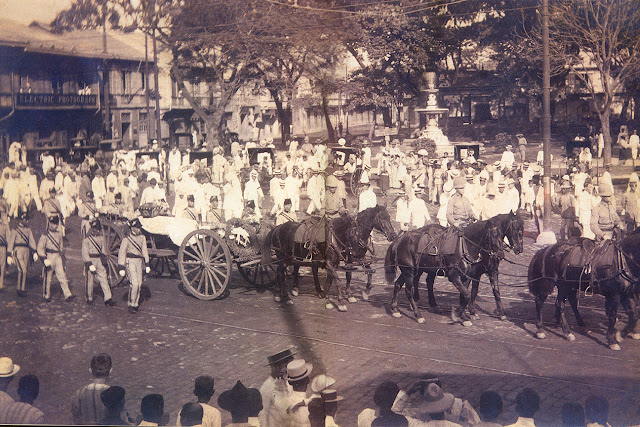
December 30, 1912: The catafalque carrying the urn that contains Jose Rizal's remains is marched through Manila to Luneta with the Knights of Rizal as honor guards and the Freemasons of the Grand Lodge of the Philippines marching in step.

In 1916, Col. Torres formally organized the Order as a private non-stock corporation. In 1951, the Supreme Council of the Order created a Committee on Legislation for the purpose of studying the feasibility of filing a bill in the Congress of the Philippines to be enacted into law to enable the Order to secure a legislative charter. Justice Roman Ozaeta was the Chairman of the Committee with Sir Carlos Hilado and Sir Pedro Sabido as members.

The bill seeking to give the Order of the Knights of Rizal a legislative charter was docketed as Senate Bill No. 251. Senators Enrique Magalona, Lorenzo Sumulong, Esteban Abada, Emiliano Tria Tirona, Camilo Osías, Geronima Pécson, José Avelino and Ramon Torres sponsored the bill in the Senate while Congressman Manuel Zola of Cebu was the principal sponsor in the House of Representatives. Attached to the bill was an explanatory note that read:

The bill if enacted into law will also serve as a historical monument to Rizal; it will constitute an official recognition by the Republic of the Philippines of the inestimable value to the nation of his teachings an examples and the wisdom and necessity of inculcating them into the minds and hearts of our people so they may strive to follow and practice them. The authors and proponents of this bill believe that if the purposes thereof are faithfully and effectively carried out, social discipline, civic virtues, and love of justice will be fostered, promoted, and enhanced in this country, and that the Knights of Rizal as a chartered entity is the most convenient instrumentality by which this desirable ends can be attained. Let Rizal's life and martyrdom influence and guide the destiny of the nation. Let this and future generations live the Rizal way.

The bill was passed by Congress on May 15, 1951. It was signed into law by President Elpidio Quirino on June 14, 1951 as Republic Act 646. The new law shortened the English name to "Knights of Rizal" while keeping its original form in Spanish as "Orden de Caballeros de Rizál."

== Structure and Governance ==
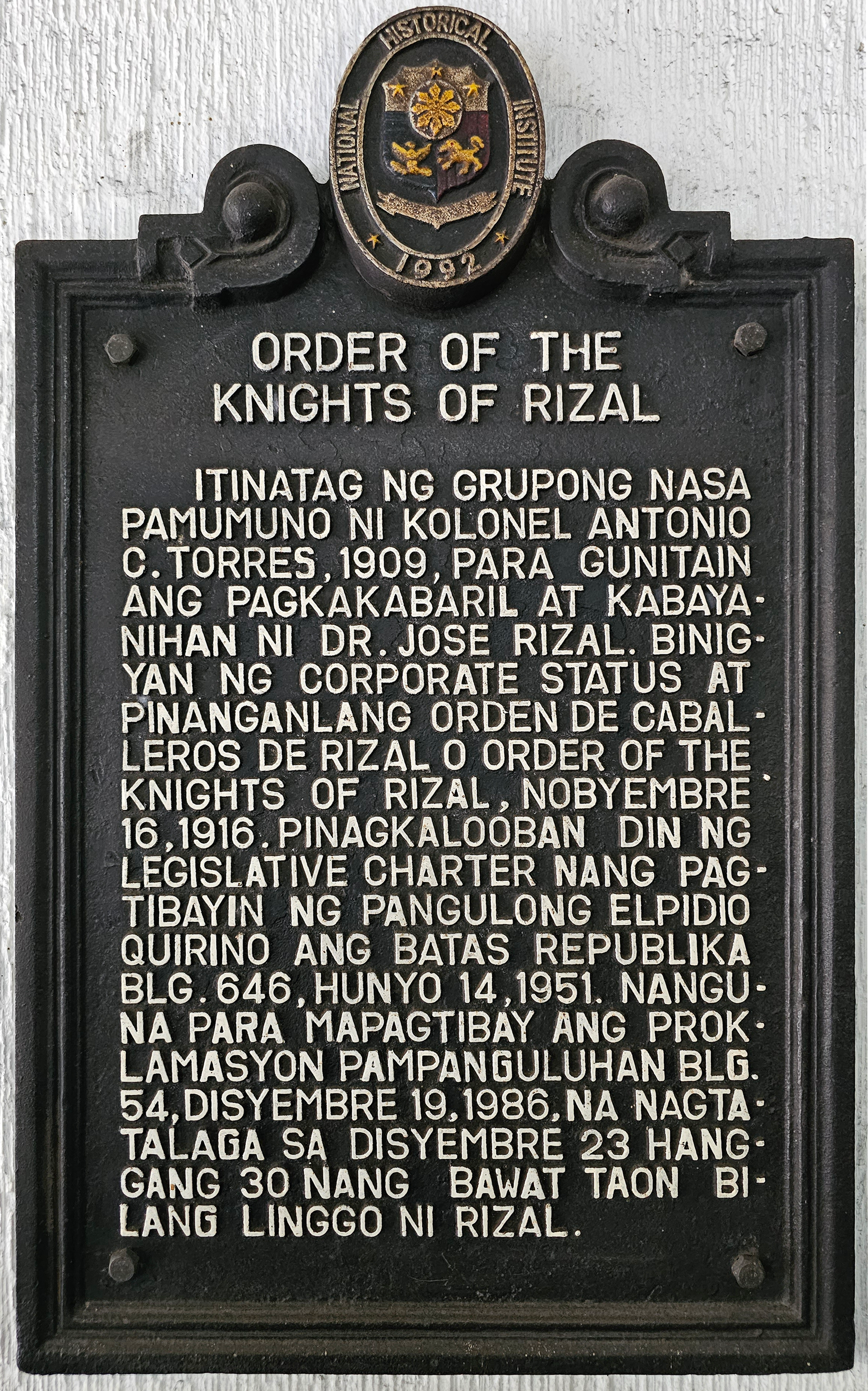
Historical marker at the headquarters of the Order in Manila

As set forth by Philippine Republic Act 646, the general administration and direction of the affairs of the Order is in the hands of a Supreme Council of nine members including the Supreme Commander, Deputy Supreme Commander, Supreme Chancellor, Supreme Pursuivant, Supreme Exchequer, Supreme Archivist, Supreme Auditor, Deputy Supreme Pursuivant and Deputy Supreme Exchequer. The Supreme Council Trustees serve the Supreme Council for two (2) years, with maximum of two (2) re-elections as stated in the Amended By-Laws.

The present Supreme Council of the Order consist of the following knights who were elected on November 30, 2025:

- Supreme Commander: Sir Emmanuel F. Calairo, KGCR (former Chairperson, National Historical Commission of the Philippines);
- Deputy Supreme Commander: Sir Joel V. Tuplano, KGOR (Municipal Agriculturist-Veterinarian, Municipality of Angono, Rizal);
- Supreme Chancellor: Sir Mauricio L. Sardido, KGOR;
- Supreme Pursuivant: Sir Jose Vicente B. Salazar, KGOR (Senior Partner, SEDA Law and former Undersecretary, Department of Justice);
- Supreme Exchequer: Sir Robert Theodore S. Romero, KGOR;
- Supreme Auditor: Sir Arnold Villafuerte, KGCR;
- Supreme Archivist and Overseas Representative: Sir Alexander Onia, KGOR;
- Deputy Supreme Pursuivant: Sir Joselito Jay C. Cayabyab, KGOR; and
- Deputy Supreme Exchequer: Sir Rene Elias C. Lopez., KGOR (former City Councilor, Davao City).

== Activities ==
The Knights of Rizal is an active order with many social, cultural, and charitable projects all around the world.

Knights lead or take an active role in official and diplomatic ceremonies commemorating important dates in José Rizal's life and the Philippine Independence Day. In the Philippines, the Order is a staple at most national events held at Luneta with the President of the Philippines in attendance. In various cities overseas, the Order sponsors and marches as honor guards in the Philippine Independence Day Parade and other events in the Filipino community.

The Order also focuses on Filipino youth across the world through programs such as the annual National Rizal Youth Leadership Institute Conference and the annual Search for Jose Rizal Model Students of the Philippines (JRMSP) held every December in the Philippines.

Globally, chapters sponsor charitable projects for the betterment of their local or international communities year-round. Projects include construction of various schoolhouses for children, support for families in times of disaster, sponsorship and scholarship programs for students, among others.

Various fundraisers, balls, and galas are held throughout the year by chapters across the world to raise money in support of the Order’s mission and to exhibit Filipino culture and cuisine. These events usually feature Rigodon de Honor dancing, Filipiniana fashion shows, and music by Filipino artists.

The Knights of Rizal, in keeping with Rizal's advocacy of wellness, has joined hands with the Children's First 1000 Days Coalition (CFDC), an alliance of various government, private, and non-government sectors of Filipino society in its fight against malnutrition during the first 1000 days of a child's life through various health programs, policy reforms, and advocacy efforts.

== Eligibility and Membership ==
The Order respects all races, faiths, and social status, and does not take into account one’s nationality or citizenship. Membership does not only convey privilege but requires continuous participation in the work of the Order.

Membership is by invitation only with the endorsement of two active knights and the approval of the Supreme Council. Postulants may be approached by knights of the Order directly or they may petition for membership. A postulant must be a man of legal age who is of impeccable character and has a demonstrated commitment to the values epitomized by Rizal. Postulants who are successfully admitted into the Order may enjoy all the privileges of knights of the Order whether or not they are citizens of the Philippines. All knighthoods are substantive and never simply honorary as they are not only a recognition of past service and charitable deeds but also an expectation of future active work and growth within the Order.

All postulants are privately investigated before any formal proceedings take place. Upon successful vetting, the local chapter files a formal recommendation to the appropriate prefectural tribunal for approval, after which the recommendation goes before the eyes of the Supreme Council acting as Lower Prefectural Tribunal, who votes on conferring knighthood. This also applies to rank promotions until the third degree rank and awards up to the Distinguished Service Cross (DSC).

The honor of knighthood and all subsequent promotions and awards are conferred by the local chapter through a diploma signed by the Supreme Commander and Supreme Pursuivant under the authority of the Supreme Council vested in it by Republic Act 646. The postulant is knighted or promoted in a solemn ceremony steeped in tradition that is presided usually by the Supreme Commander or members of the Supreme Council present. In their absence, the Supreme Commander gives authority the Regional or Area Commander in performing such ceremonies.

It is tradition that all new rank insignia or decoration presented to the knight being dubbed, promoted or awarded are done with a loved one or a sponsoring senior knight taking an active part in affixing the new rank or decoration onto the knight’s uniform for the first time, similar to a military pinning ceremony.

== Privileges, titles, and precedence ==
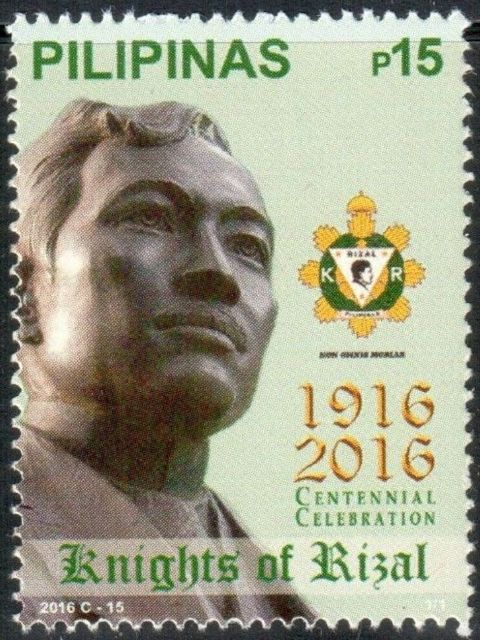
Stamp released by PHLPost to celebrate the centennial of the Order's initial formation in 1916, featuring a profile of Rizal.

As the only state-recognized order of chivalry in the Philippines, the honor of membership is held in high regard. It is a crime for any person to misrepresent themselves to be a knight or agent of the Order and anyone found guilty of doing so may be fined or imprisoned for up to six months, or both.

Knights have the right to wear the insignia and vestments of the Order at all appropriate occasions in accordance to the Order's Amended By-Laws and to the Order of Wear of the Philippines. The Order's ranks and insignia are formally recognized by Executive Order No. 236, more commonly known as the Honors Code of the Philippines, making the Order seventh in precedence.

=== Titles ===
Knights of all degrees, and their wives, are entitled to specific titles that apply to both spoken and written forms of address.

==== Knights ====
Knights of the Order prefix Sir before their names and may use the appropriate post-nominal letters of their rank after their names.

- Knight Grand Cross of Rizal recipients use the post-nominals KGCR;
- Knight Grand Officers, KGOR;
- Knight Commanders, KCR;
- Knight Officers, KOR; and
- Knights, KR.

For example, a Juan de la Cruz of the rank Knight Grand Cross may be styled as Sir Juan de la Cruz, KGCR. The dignity of knighthood is only held for life and cannot be inherited nor passed down.

==== Wives of knights ====
A wife of a knight prefixes Lady to her first name regardless of whether she uses her own surname or her husband's surname. For example, a Christine Reyes, wife of Sir Juan de la Cruz, may be styled as:

- Lady Christine Reyes, or
- Lady Christine

Note that this differs from Western convention, specifically that of the British system used in the United Kingdom and the Commonwealth realms (e.g. Order of the British Empire) where wives of knights prefix Lady to their surname instead and only if they use their husband's surname.

== Degrees and Decorations ==
All of the Order's medals and awards are considered awards given by the Republic of the Philippines.

=== Degrees and Insignia ===
There are five degrees of knighthood, each with their own post-nominals and insignia.

Degrees
1st	2nd	3rd	4th	5th
Knight	Knight Officer	Knight Commander	Knight Grand Officer	Knight Grand Cross
Insignia
Regalia of a KR is a ribbon of the Order	Regalia of a KOR is a ribbon with a golden anahaw rosette	Regalia of a KCR is a neck ribbon of the Order	Regalia of a KGOR includes a silver breast star and sash of the Order	Regalia of a KGCR includes a gold breast star and sash of the Order
Ribbon	Ribbon with a golden anahaw rosette	Neck ribbon	Silver breast star and sash	Gold breast star with sash

=== Other Awards and Decorations ===
These commendations may be awarded to any knight or person on the merit of their achievements for the Order or the Philippines.

- Medal of Recognition
- Distinguished Service Medal
- Distinguished Service Star
- Distinguished Service Cross
- Rizal Pro Patria Award

=== For Women and Ladies Auxiliary ===
In addition to the above, these awards are specifically reserved for women who have distinguished themselves within or outside the Order.

- Teodora Alonzo Award
- Rizal Women of Malolos Award

== Prominent recipients ==
=== Presidents of the Philippines ===
Most Philippine presidents since the country first declared independence from colonial powers in 1898 have received the honor of knighthood or an award from the Order by virtue of their office and/or services they have given to the Filipino people.

Presidential Term	Photo	Name	Known for	Notes
1899-1901		Sir Emilio Aguinaldo y Famy QSC CCLH PMM KGCR	First president of the Philippines; First president of an Asian constitutional republic; General of the Philippine Revolution against the Spanish Empire (1896-1899); General of the Philippine armed forces against the United States of America (1899-1901) in the Philippine-American War	
1935-1944		Sir Manuel Luis Quezon y Molina GCGH KGCR	President of the Commonwealth of the Philippines; Recipient of a posthumous Wallenberg Medal for his efforts with US High Commissioner Paul V. McNutt in facilitating the entry of 1,200 Jewish refugees fleeing Nazi Germany when most countries closed their doors to them ahead of WWII.; First Filipino to lead a government that represented the entirety of the Philippines; Known as "The Father of the National Language"	
1943-1945		Sir José Paciano Laurel y Garcia CCLH KGCR	President of the Second Philippine Republic during the Japanese occupation of WWII; Associate Justice of the Philippine Supreme Court who authored several landmark cases that defined the parameters of the branches of government as well as their powers; Chairman of the Senate Committee on Education and sponsor of a 1955 bill that made José Rizal's two novels, Noli Me Tángere and El filibusterismo, compulsory readings in all universities and colleges	
1957-1961		Sir Carlos Polestico Garcia KR	Eighth president of the Philippines; Chairman of the eight-nation Southeast Asian Security Conference held in Manila in September 1954, which led to the development of the Southeast Asia Treaty Organization (SEATO); First layman to lie in state in Manila Cathedral—a privilege once reserved for the Archbishops of Manila—and the first president to be buried at the Libingan ng mga Bayani	
1961-1965	Diosdado Macapagal photo	Sir Diosdado Pangan Macapagal, Sr. GCrM, KGCR	Ninth president of the Philippines; Shifted Philippine Independence Day celebrations from July 4 to June 12, the day President Aguinaldo declared independence from the Spanish Empire; Convened Maphilindo—a proposed confederation of Malaysia, Indonesia and the Philippines—a realization of José Rizal's dream of bringing together the Malay peoples, seen as artificially divided by colonial frontiers	
1965-1986		Sir Ferdinand Emmanuel Edralin Marcos, Sr. CCLH KGCR	Tenth president of the Philippines, ruling the country as a dictator under martial law from 1972 to 1981, and with vastly expanded powers under the 1973 Constitution until he was overthrown by the 1986 EDSA People Power Revolution.; He presided over a Philippine economy that grew in the beginning of his 20-year rule but would end in human rights abuses and extreme poverty, together with a crushing debt crisis.; One of the most controversial figures in Filipino history, Marcos's regime is infamous for its corruption, extravagance, and brutality. Marcos and his wife, Imelda, were jointly credited in 1989 by Guinness World Records with the largest-ever theft from a government (an estimated 5 billion to 10 billion US dollars), a record they still hold today.	
1992-1998		Sir Fidel Valdez Ramos CCLH GCS KGCR	12th president of the Philippines and the only career military officer who has held the office (five-star general); During the 1986 EDSA People Power Revolution, Ramos was hailed as a hero by many Filipinos for his decision to break away from the administration of Marcos, and pledge allegiance and loyalty to the newly established government of President Corazon C. Aquino; Credited for revitalizing and renewing international confidence in the Philippine economy during his six years in office	
1998-2001		Sir Joseph Ejercito Estrada KGCR	13th president of the Philippines until his removal by the Second EDSA People Power Revolution due to corruption, whose trial was the first televised impeachment trial of a sitting Philippine president; he is the first chief executive in Asia to be impeached; Under his presidency, he declared an "all-out-war" against the Moro Islamic Liberation Front and captured its headquarters and other camps.	
2001-2010		Excelentísima Señora Gloria Macapagal-Arroyo DoYC	14th president of the Philippines, and only the second female after President Corazon C. Aquino, after emerging as winner in the controversial 2004 presidential election; First female vice president of the Philippines (during the term of President Joseph Estrada); First president to succeed the presidency as the child of a previous president (Diosdado Macapagal); Abolished capital punishment in 2006 after commuting the death sentences of over 1,200 prisoners	Conferred the Teodora Alonzo Award by the Order
2010-2016		Sir Benigno Simeon Aquino III KGCR	15th president of the Philippines and son of Sir Benigno Simeon Aquino, Jr. (martyr and chief cause of the 1986 EDSA People Power Revolution) and President Corazon C. Aquino; former student of President Gloria Macapagal-Arroyo; The Philippine economy grew at the highest rates in decades during his presidency, and the country was dubbed a "Rising Tiger" economy; His administration filed an arbitration case, Philippines v. China, before the Permanent Court of Arbitration in an attempt to invalidate China's claims in the South China Sea and assert the Philippines' claims in the area; this resulted in a landmark decision where the court ruled in favor of the Philippines and Philippine sovereignty over the disputed zone	
2016-2022		Sir Rodrigo Roa Duterte KGCR SMIJ	16th president of the Philippines and the first president from Mindanao as well as the oldest president to take office; As of 2025, he is under investigation by the International Criminal Court for crimes against humanity regarding extrajudicial killings executed during his administration's war on drugs.	

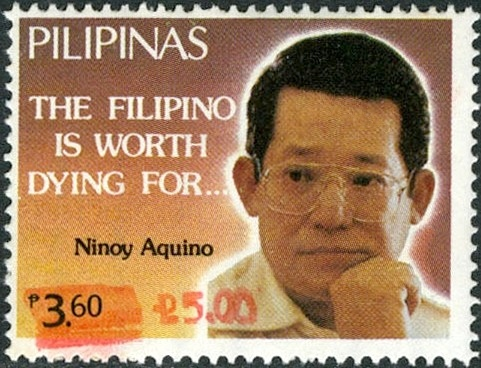
Senator Sir Benigno Aquino Jr. on a PHLPost stamp released in 2000

=== Members of Philippine Senate and House of Representatives ===
- Sir Benigno S. Aquino Jr.: Senator of the Philippines. Governor of Tarlac. Husband to President Corazon Aquino, the first female President of the Philippines, and father to President Sir Benigno Aquino III.
- Sir Jovito Salonga: First Chairman of the Presidential Commission on Good Government and President of the Senate of the Philippines.
- Sir Feliciano Belmonte Jr.: Speaker of the House of Representatives of the Philippines.
- Pia S. Cayetano: Senator of the Philippines: Conferred the Rizal Women of Malolos Award by the Order.

=== Cabinet Secretaries, Vice Presidents, and Ministers of the Philippines ===
- H.E. Sir Fernando Lopez: Vice President of the Philippines. Secretary of Agriculture, Senator, and Natural Resources and Chairman of ABS-CBN Corporation.
- H.E. Sir Salvador Laurel: Vice President of the Philippines. Prime Minister and Secretary of Foreign Affairs.
- H.E. Sir Cesar Virata: Prime Minister of the Philippines.
- Sir Jose D. Lina Jr.: Secretary of the Interior and Local Government, Governor of Laguna, Governor of Metro Manila, and Senator of the Philippines. Supreme Commander of the Order.
- Sir Delfin Lorenzana: Secretary of National Defense and Chairman of the National Task Force against COVID-19.

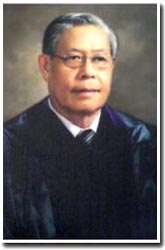
The Honorable Sir Hilario Davide Jr.

=== Chief Justices of the Philippines ===
- The Honorable Sir Hilario Davide Jr.: Chief Justice of the Philippines, Philippine Representative to the United Nations, author of the 1986 Constitution of the Philippines, and Supreme Commander of the Order.
- The Honorable Sir Claudio Teehankee: Chief Justice and Secretary of Justice of the Philippines. Supreme Commander of the Order.
- The Honorable Sir Reynato Puno: Chief Justice of the Philippines. Supreme Commander of the Order.

=== Artists of the Philippines ===
- Sir Juan F. Nakpil: National Artist of the Philippines. Supreme Commander of the Order.
- Sir Jhett Tolentino: Entertainment Producer and first Filipino to win both a Grammy Award and a Tony Award for his work in the entertainment industry.

=== Philippine Diplomatic Corps ===
- H.E. Sir Carlos P. Romulo: President of the United Nations General Assembly. President of the University of the Philippines, Philippine Ambassador to the United States, Secretary of Foreign Affairs, and Secretary of Education.
- H.E. Sir León María Guerrero III: Philippine Ambassador to the United Kingdom, India, Spain, Mexico, and Yugoslavia.
- H.E. Sir Jose L. Cuisia Jr.: Philippine Ambassador to the United States. Governor of the Central Bank of the Philippines.
- H.E. Sir Victor G. Garcia III: Philippine Ambassador to the Russian Federation, Austria, Croatia, Slovenia, Bosnia-Herzegovina, and Philippine Permanent Resident to international organizations in Vienna, Austria. Signatory for the UN Convention Against Transnational Organized Crime.
- H.E. Sir Jose S. Laurel III: Philippine Ambassador to Japan. Supreme Commander of the Order.
- H.E. Sir Eduardo de Vega, KGOR : Philippine Ambassador to Mexico, Belgium, Luxembourg, and the European Union.
- H.E. Sir Philippe Lhuillier: Philippine Ambassador to Italy, Albania, San Marino, and Spain.
- H.E. Sir Jesus S. Domingo: Philippine Ambassador to New Zealand, Cook Islands, Fiji, Samoa and Tonga.
- H.E. Sir J. Eduardo Malaya, KGOR: Philippine Ambassador to The Kingdom of the Netherlands.
- H.E. Sir Alfonso Ferdinand Ver, KGOR: Philippine Ambassador to The United Arab Emirates
- H.E. Sir Paul Raymund Pasion Cortes, KCR: Philippine Ambassador to Portugal

=== Other Prominent Members ===
- Sir Antonio C. Torres: First Filipino Chief of Manila Police Department (MPD), Founder of the Order.
- Sir Gabriel A. Daza: Charter member of the Boy Scouts of the Philippines (BSP). Supreme Exchequer and of the Order.
- Sir Hermenegildo Reyes: Co-Founder of the University of the East. Supreme Commander of the Order.

=== Foreign Recipients of the Order or its awards ===
Country	Photo	Name	Known for	Notes
Spain		HM King Juan Carlos I	King of Spain	
United States of America		Sir Henry Kissinger	Secretary of State of the United States of America	
United States of America		Sir Theodore Roosevelt III	Governor-General of the Commonwealth of the Philippines	Knighted by then-Senate President Sir Manuel L. Quezon at Luneta.
Malaysia		Sir Anwar Ibrahim	10th Prime Minister of Malaysia	
Croatia		Sir Stjepan Mesić, KGCR	President of Croatia (2000-2010)	
(Socialist Federal Republic of Yugoslavia) Yugoslavia		Sir Stjepan Mesić, KGCR	President of Yugoslavia (1991)	
Thailand	Itthiphol Kunplome Minister of Culture of Thailand	Sir Itthiphol Khunpluem	Thai Minister of Culture and Mayor of Pattaya	
Czech Republic		Sir Antonín Staněk, KGOR	16th Minister of Culture of the Czech Republic (2018-2019), former Member of Chamber of Deputies, Parliament of the Czech Republic (2017-2021), former Vice-chairman of Committee on Defence (2020-2021), 26th Mayor of the City of Olomouc (2014-2018)	
Australia		Sir Billy Chan KGOR	Ambassador for the Global Fair Pay Charter, UNITAR	
Australia		Sir Patrick Tsang, KCR	Chairman of the International Police Association, Section Australia, New South Wales Region	
Canada		Sir Tobias Enverga	Senator for Ontario	
France	Jean-Marc Ayrault - septembre 2011	Britgitte Ayrault	Wife of Prime Minister of France Jean-Marc Ayrault	Conferred the Rizal Women of Malolos Award for her charity work with Filipino children
United Kingdom		Sir Austin Coates	British civil servant and author	Wrote “Rizal: Philippine Nationalist and Martyr“ (1968)
United States of America		Sir John Ensign	United States Senator of the State of Nevada	
Japan		Sir Daisaku Ikeda	President of Soka Gakkai in Japan	
Japan		Sir Kiyoshi Sumiya	Japanese Ambassador to the Philippines	
Canada		Sir Anthony Housefather	Member of the Canadian Parliament and Mayor of Côte Saint-Luc	
United States of America		Sir Emanuel Jones, KCR	USA Georgia State Senator, Senate Committee on Economic Development and International Relations	
Australia		Sir Nicholas George Tam, KCR	Vice Chairman of the Royal Commonwealth Society Hong Kong Branch	
Rwanda	Yuhi_VI_of_Rwanda_(2017)	HM King Yuhi VI of Rwanda	Titular King of Rwanda	
United Kingdom		Sir Mark Clayton, KOR	Chairman of the British Chamber of Commerce South China	
