= Sa Aking Mga Kabata =

Poem often attributed to Jose Rizal

- by unknown
- Country: Philippines
- Language: Tagalog
- Subject: Language

"Sa Aking Mga Kabatà" (English: To My Fellow Youth) is a poem about the love of one's native language written in Tagalog. It is widely attributed to the Filipino national hero José Rizal, who supposedly wrote it in 1868 at the age of eight. There is not enough evidence, however, to support authorship by Rizal and several historians now believe it to be a hoax.

== Prominence ==
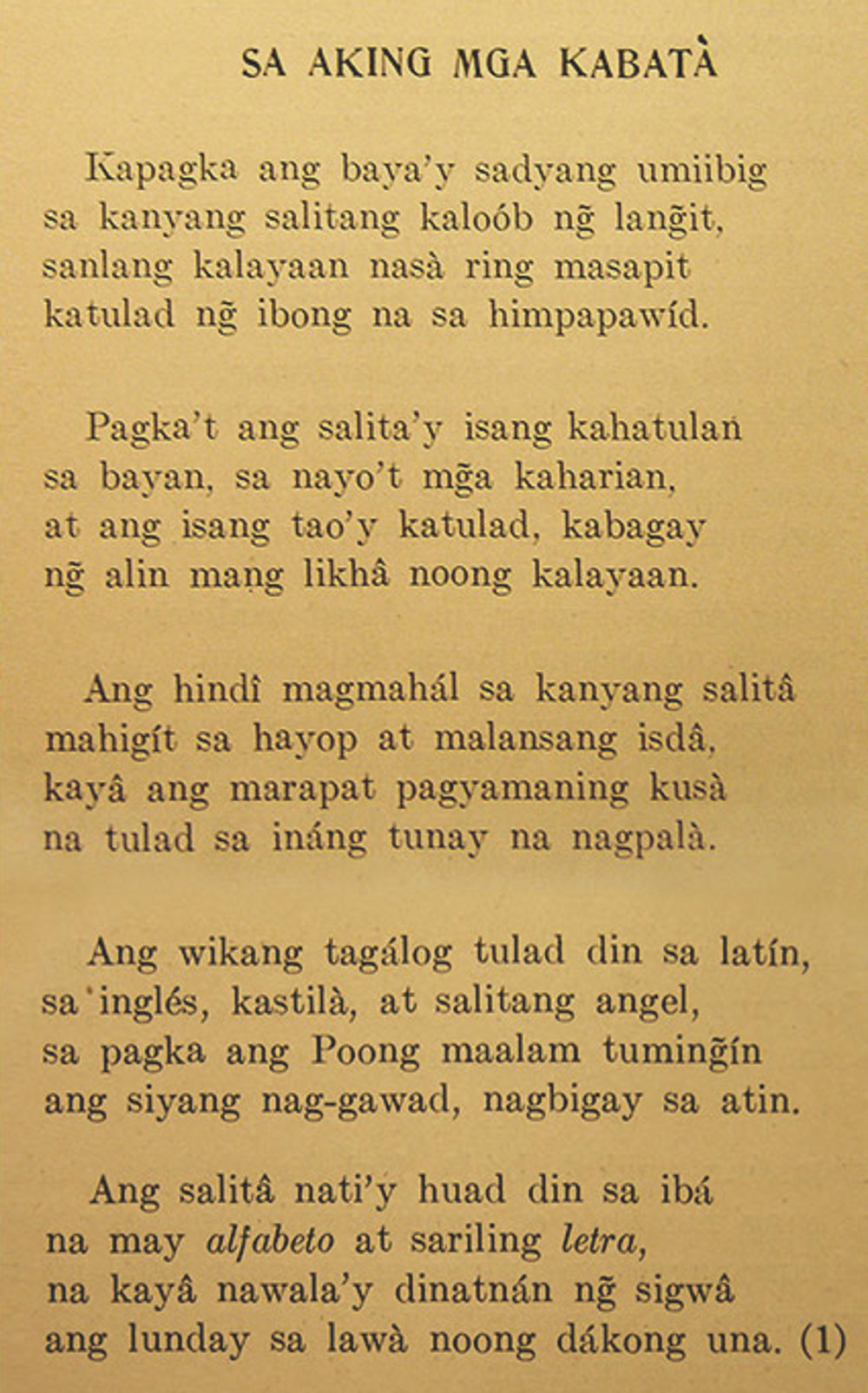
The oldest known copy of the poem appears in Kun sino ang kumathâ ng̃ "Florante": kasaysayan sa buhay ni Francisco Baltazar at pag-uulat nang kanyang karunung̃a't kadakilaan (1906) by Hermenegildo Cruz. Note that the poem uses the Philippine Commonwealth-era Tagalog spelling with a 'K'. If Rizal had indeed written it, it should have used the phonetically equivalent Spanish 'C'.

The poem was widely taught in Philippine schools to point out Rizal's precociousness and early development of his nationalistic ideals.

A passage of the poem often paraphrased as "Ang hindi marunong magmahal sa sariling wika, masahol pa sa hayop at malansang isda" (English: "He who knows not to love his own language, is worse than beasts and putrid fish") is widely quoted in order to justify pressuring Philippine citizens into using Tagalog; this ironically includes its majority of nonnative speakers. It is encountered most frequently during the Buwan ng Wika ('Language Month'), a commemoration of the establishment of the Filipino language as the national language of the Philippines.

== Publication history ==
No manuscript for "Sa Aking Mga Kabatà" in Rizal's handwriting exists. The poem was first published in 1906, a decade after his death, in a book by the poet Hermenegildo Cruz. Cruz claimed that he received the poem from another poet, Gabriel Beato Francisco, who in turn had received it in 1884 from an alleged close friend of Rizal, Saturnino Raselis. José Rizal, however, never mentioned anyone by the name of Saturnino Raselis. The poem may have actually been written by Cruz or Francisco.

Pascual H. Poblete published a different account in his introduction to the 1909 translation Noli Me Tangere; Novelang Wicang Castila Na Tinagalog Ni Pascual H. Poblete (note old Tagalog spelling), he claims that the poem was well known to Filipino poets during Rizal's childhood. This account was later repeated in Austin Coates' 1968 biography of Rizal, Rizal: Philippine Nationalist and Martyr, who further added that Juan Luna had a role in preserving the poem. This is not substantiated by any known evidence.

The earliest known poems of Rizal in the National Historical Institute's collection, Poesías Por José Rizal, also date six years after the alleged writing date of "Sa Aking Mga Kabatà". His own account of the earliest awakening of his nationalistic views, identifies it as the year 1872 – the year of the executions of the priests Mariano Gómez, José Apolonio Burgos, and Jacinto Zamora. The poem is never mentioned by Rizal himself in his writings, despite its apparent significance in terms of his future ideals.

== Authenticity ==
Historian Ambeth Ocampo, National Artist of the Philippines, writer Virgilio S. Almario, and others have debunked Rizal's traditional authorship of the poem based on the following:

The poem uses the Tagalog word kalayaan (liberty/freedom). However, the earliest Rizal might have first encountered the word was 1882, when he was 21 years old – 13 years after he supposedly wrote the poem. Rizal first came across kalayaan (or as it was spelled during the Spanish period, kalayahan), through a Tagalog translation by Marcelo H. del Pilar of Rizal's own essay "El Amor Patrio".

The fluency and sophistication of the Tagalog used in the poem also do not match Rizal's grasp of the language. Although Rizal's native tongue was Tagalog, his early education was all in Spanish. In the oft-quoted anecdote of the moth and the flame from Rizal's memoir, the children's book he and his mother were reading was entitled El Amigo de los Niños, and it was in Spanish. He would later lament his difficulties in expressing himself in Tagalog. In 1886, Rizal was in Leipzig working on a Tagalog translation of Friedrich Schiller's play William Tell, which he sent home to his brother Paciano. In the accompanying letter, Rizal speaks of his difficulty finding an appropriate Tagalog equivalent of Freiheit (freedom), settling on kalayahan. Rizal cited Del Pilar's translation of his own essay as his source for kalayahan. Rizal also attempted to write Makamisa (the intended sequel to El filibusterismo) in Tagalog, only to give up after only ten pages and start again in Spanish.

The eight-year old Rizal's apparent familiarity with Latin and English is also questionable. In his memoir as a student in Manila, a year after the poem's supposed writing date, he admitted only having 'a little' knowledge of Latin from lessons by a friend of his father. Rizal also did not study English until 1880, more than ten years after the poem was allegedly written. English was not a prominent language in the Philippines in 1869 and its presence in the poem is believed to betray later authorship during the American Commonwealth of the Philippines.

The poem also makes use of the letters 'K' and 'W', whereas during Rizal's childhood, Tagalog spelling was based on Spanish orthography in which neither letter was used. The letters 'C' and 'U' were used instead (i.e., the poem would have been spelled "Sa Aquing Mañga Cabata"). The shift in Tagalog and later Filipino orthography from 'C' to 'K' and 'U' to 'W' were proposed by Rizal himself as an adult, and was later made official in the early 20th century by the Philippine government as per grammarian Lope K. Santos's proposal.

== Translation ==
The abakada in Baybayin, a native script of the Tagalog language. This script is perhaps alluded to by the author in the last stanza of the poem.

Sa Aking Mga Kabatà

Kapagka ang baya'y sadyáng umiibig
Sa kanyáng salitáng kaloob ng langit,
Sanlang kalayaan nasa ring masapit
Katulad ng ibong nasa himpapawid.

Pagka't ang salita'y isang kahatulan
Sa bayan, sa nayo't mga kaharián,
At ang isáng tao'y katulad, kabagay
Ng alin mang likha noong kalayaán.

Ang hindi magmahal sa kanyang salitâ
Mahigit sa hayop at malansáng isdâ,
Kayâ ang marapat pagyamaning kusà
Na tulad sa ináng tunay na nagpalà.

Ang wikang Tagalog tulad din sa Latin
Sa Inglés, Kastilà at salitang anghel,
Sapagka't ang Poong maalam tumingín
Ang siyang naggawad, nagbigay sa atin.

Ang salita nati'y huwad din sa iba
Na may alfabeto at sariling letra,
Na kaya nawalá'y dinatnan ng sigwâ
Ang lunday sa lawà noóng dakong una.

Translation:

To My Fellow Youth

If a nation's people certainly love
The gift of their language bestowed by heaven,
So too will they regain their pawned freedom
Like a bird who takes to the sky.

For language is a measure of worth
Of cities, nations, and kingdoms,
And each person alike deserves it,
As does any creation born free.

One who does not treasure his own language
is worse than a beast or a putrid fish,
Thus it should be nurtured intently,
As a mother nurtures her child.

The Tagalog language is like Latin,
Like English, Spanish, and the language of angels
Because the Lord, in His wisdom
Bestowed it, He gave it to us.

Our language is like that of others,
With its own alphabet and its own characters,
But they vanished as if a sudden storm had come upon
A boat in a lake in an age long past.

== See also ==
- A la juventud filipina (Tagalog: Sa Kabataang Pilipino), a Spanish poem by Rizal with a similar title but with a very different view towards Spain
- Code of Kalantiaw, another widely taught hoax perpetuated through the Philippine education system
- Kundiman, a genre of traditional Filipino love songs
