= Vida y Escritos del Dr. José Rizal =

1907 biography of José Rizal by Wenceslao Emilio Retana y Gamboa

- Book cover of the first edition
- Author: Wenceslao Retana
- Language: Spanish
- Genre: Non-fiction
- Publisher: Librería General de Victoriano Suárez
- Publication date: 1907
- Publication place: Madrid
- Pages: 512
- OCLC: 7568641

Vida y Escritos del Dr. José Rizal, translated as "Life and Writings of Dr. José Rizal”, is a biography of Rizal written by Wenceslao Emilio Retana y Gamboa, a 19th-century Spanish civil servant, colonial administrator, writer, publisher, bibliophile, Filipiniana collector, and Philippine scholar. The 512-page book was published by Librería General de Victoriano Suárez of Madrid, Spain, in 1907. It contains works of Rizal such as poems and essays in "Spanish of literary merit"; some "translations and short papers" written in Tagalog, German, French, and English; and a complete listing of Rizal’s writings. The prologue for W.E. Retana’s book on Rizal was written by Javier Gómez de la Serna, while the epilogue was written by Miguel de Unamuno (1864–1936). Vida y Escritos del Dr. José Rizal is the first biographical account of the life of Rizal written by a non-Filipino author (the second is Rizal: Philippine Nationalist and Martyr by British author Austin Coates)..
