= Vademecum filipino o manual de conversación familiar español-tágalog =

The Vademecum filipino o manual de conversación familiar español-tágalog (Note: Full title: Vade-mecum filipino o manual de la conversación familiar español-tagálog. Seguido de un curioso Vocabulario de modismos Manileños. Obra de suma utilidad práctica a españoles e indios y en general a todo el que tenga necesidad de hacerse comprender en cualquiera de ambos idiomas ["Filipino vade mecum or manual of familiar Spanish-Tagalog conversation. Followed by a curious vocabulary of Manila idioms. A work of great practical use to Spaniards and Indians and in general to anyone who needs to make themselves understood in either of these languages."]) is a classic Spanish-language textbook for learning the Tagalog language by Venancio María de Abella, first published in 1868. It is one of the oldest works of this type. The contents reflect the terms and phrases of Manila's vernacular during the era of the textbook's publication.

== 14 editions between 1868 and 1876 ==
The work quickly gained considerable popularity, until 1876 there were as many as 14 of its editions. Valued for picking up a number of terms and expressions popular in Manila of that time, it also contains important information about the Philippine dialect of Spanish and the sociolinguistic situation in the Philippines in the second half of the 19th century. The material contained therein was widely used by later lexicographical studies, including Diccionario de filipinismos (1921) by Wenceslao Retana.
