= Florentino Torres =

The Honorable Florentino Torres
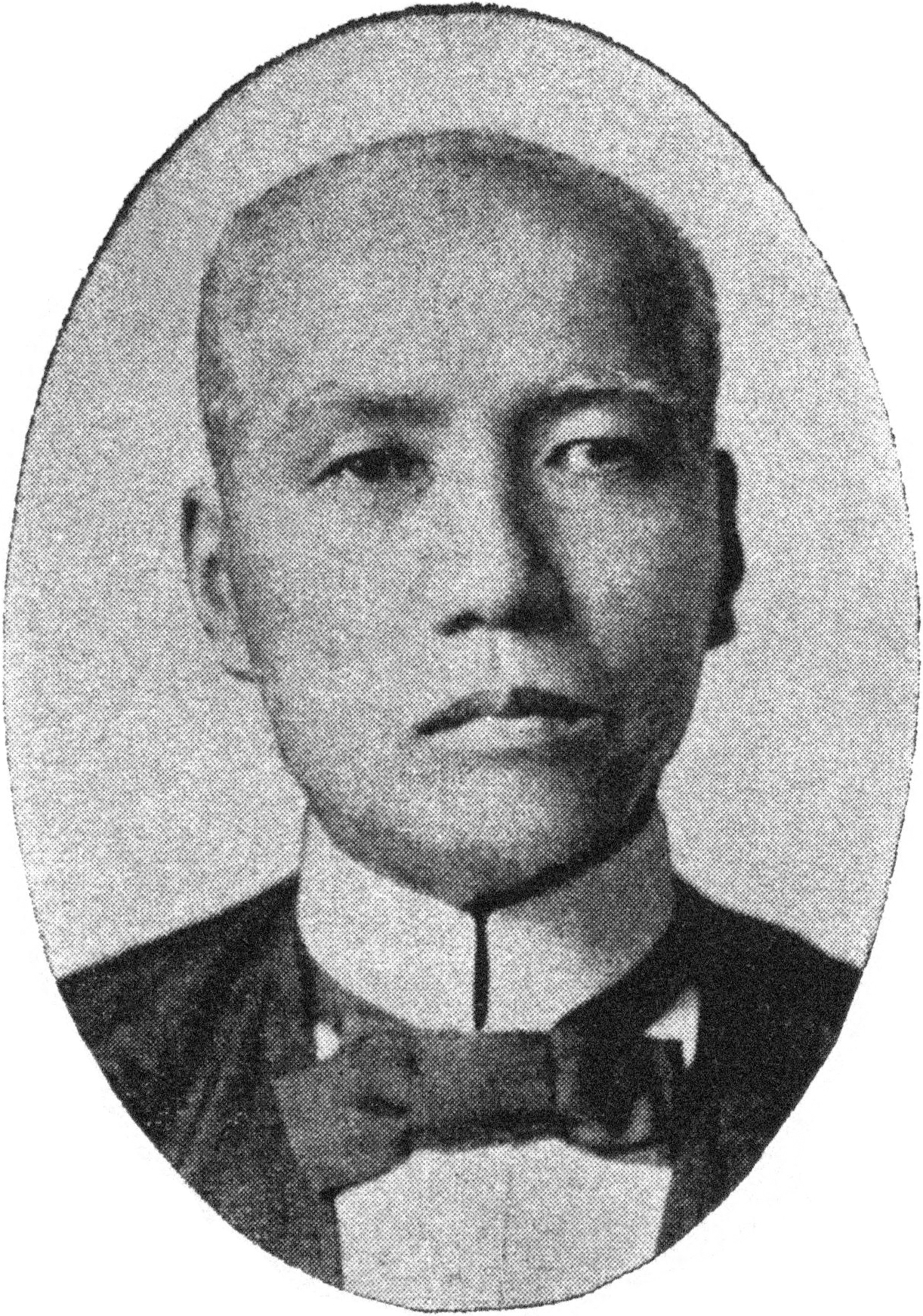
- Torres in 1908

3rd Associate Justice of the Philippine Supreme Court
- In office June 17, 1901 – April 20, 1920
- Appointed by: William McKinley
- Preceded by: Newly established
- Succeeded by: Ignacio Villamor

1st Attorney General of the Office of the Attorney of the Supreme Court
- In office May 29, 1899 – June 4, 1901
- Preceded by: Newly established
- Succeeded by: Position abolished

Personal details
- Born: Florentino de los Santos; 16 October 1844 Santa Cruz, Manila, Captaincy General of the Philippines
- Died: April 29, 1927 (aged 82) Manila, Philippine Islands

Florentino Torres Santos (born Florentino de los Santos; October 16, 1844 – April 29, 1927) was an Associate Justice of the Supreme Court of the Philippines. Prior to his appointment as an Associate Justice, he was the first Filipino to be appointed as attorney-general. He had also served as a prosecuting attorney, a prosecutor and as a judge.

== Early life ==
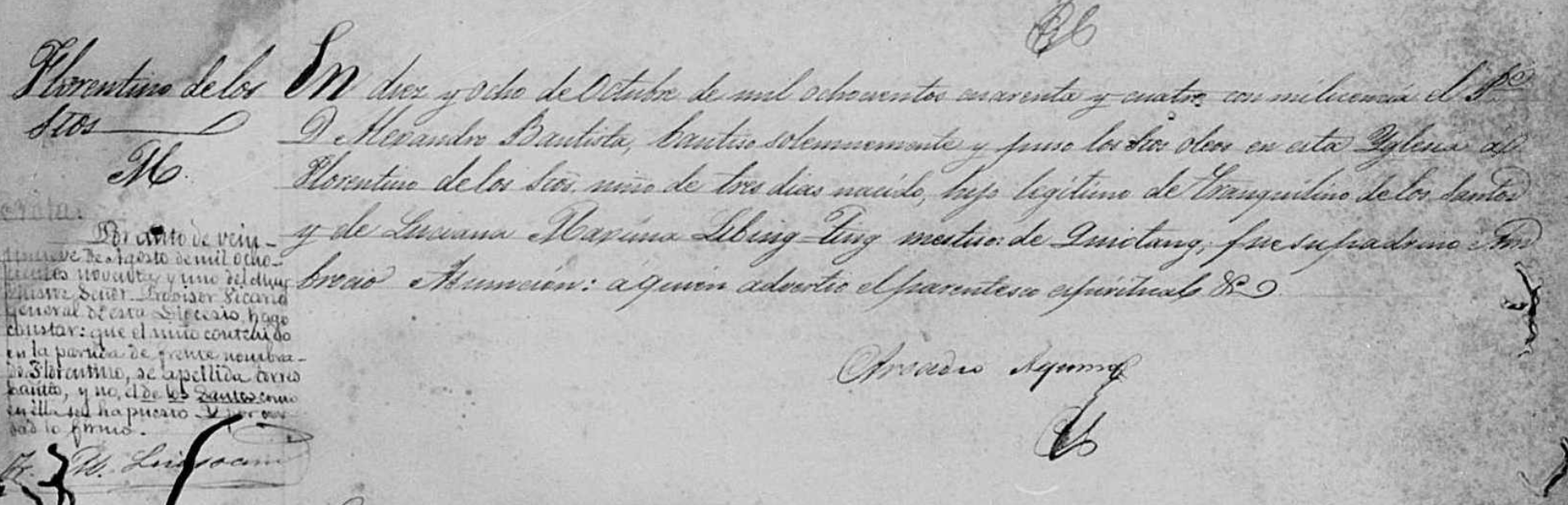
Baptismal record of Florentino Torres Santos, issued at the Minor Basilica of Our Lady of the Pillar on October 18, 1844.

Torres was born on October 16, 1844, to Tranquilino de los Santos and Luciana Livianting y Maxima in Santa Cruz, Manila, and was of Chinese mestizo descent. His father died in a ship mishap when he was still young; his mother died during the cholera epidemic of 1882.

=== Education and career ===
Torres obtained his Bachelor of Philosophy in Colegio de San Juan de Letran. He obtained his Bachelor of Canon Law and Bachelor of Civil Law at the University of Santo Tomas in 1866 and 1868, respectively.

=== Marriage ===
Torres married Sabina Vergara, a Spanish-Chinese mestiza, on April 29, 1866 in Quiapo. They had nine children: Manuel, a prominent lawyer; Luis, former Justice of the Supreme Court; Antonio, a councilor and a former Chief of Police of Manila, Jose, Eduardo, Dolores, Pilar, Alejandra and Rosa.

== Career ==
He was admitted to the bar in 1871 and was immediately appointed as the prosecuting fiscal of the Court of First Instance in the judicial district of Binondo, Manila. He had also served concurrently as the fiscal and the Secretary of the Relator de La Audiencia de Manila in the same judicial district from 1873 to 1879.

He was named as fiscal of the province of Matanzas, Cuba, though he decided to decline this position. He was appointed judge of the Court of First Instance of Ilocos Sur in 1888; and was later transferred to Pampanga in 1890. In 1892, he served as Teniente Fiscal de la Audiencia Territorial de Cebu and later as magistrate of the Audiencia de la Criminal de Cebu.

Torres was a sympathizer of the American civil government. Due to this, he was appointed as Attorney-General, the first Filipino to occupy such office. On June 17, 1901, he was appointed as an associate justice of the newly established Supreme Court of the Philippines by U.S. President William McKinley. He held such position until his resignation on April 22, 1920. He resigned believing that he was bypassed, being the most senior, after Mapa succeeded Arellano as Chief Justice.

== Political career ==
During the Philippine–American War, Emilio Aguinaldo designated Torres to negotiate a peace agreement with American authorities. Although the meeting did not achieve tangible results, he was able to influence the Aguinaldo government from making more hostile acts against the American occupation. Torres joined the Pacificos, a group who believed that independence could not be achieve through force. Later, he became a member of a new political party called Partido Federal which aimed at the annexation of the Philippines as an American state.

== Death ==
Torres died of paralysis in Manila on April 29, 1927. His remains were interred at Manila North Cemetery.

== Legacy ==
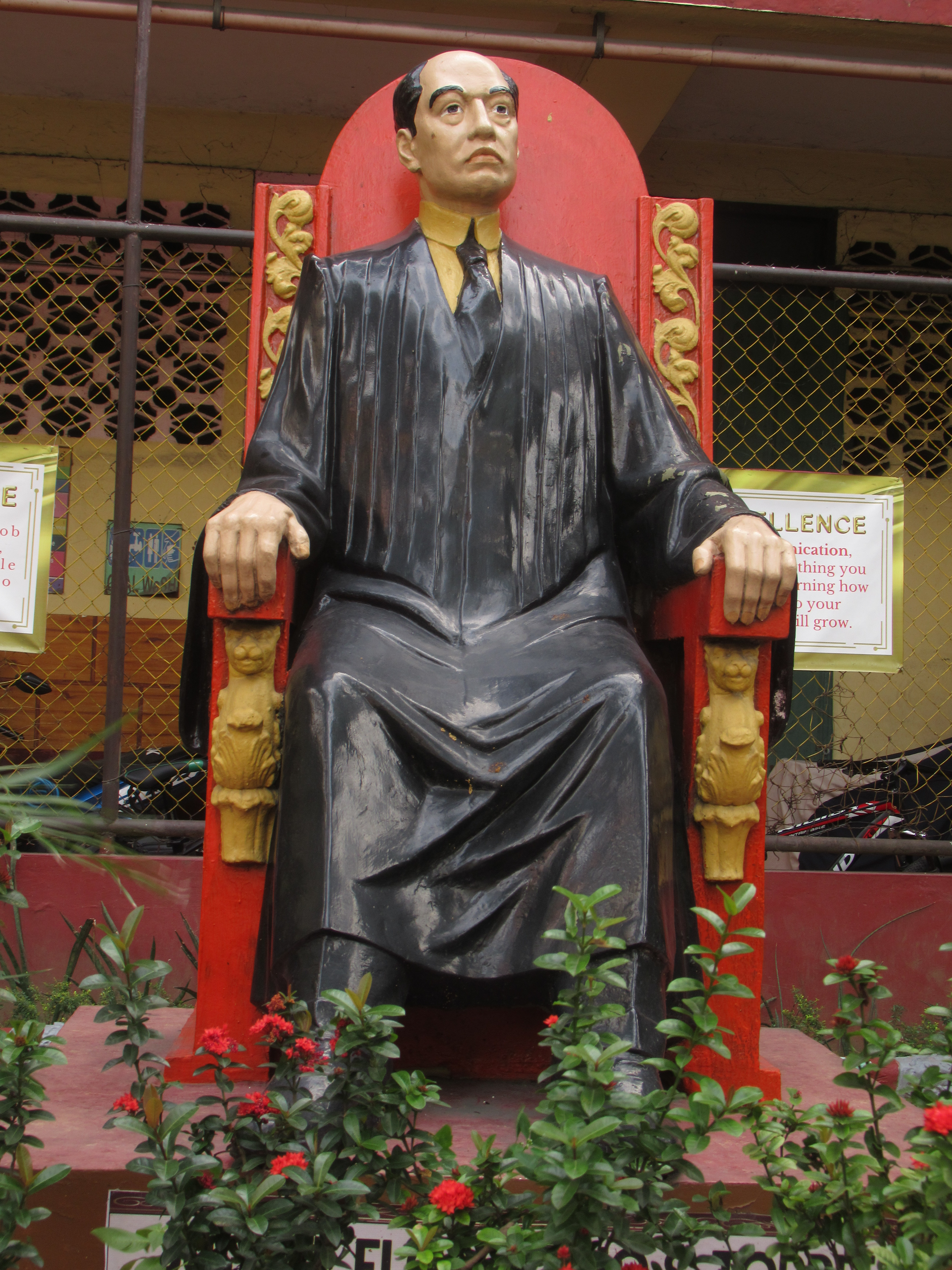
Florentino Torres High School

In 1927, Calle Almanza in Binondo, Manila was renamed to Florentino Torres Street.

Florentino Torres High School in Tondo, Manila was renamed after Torres in 1930.
