= Mi último adiós =

Poem written by Jose Rizal

- by José Rizal
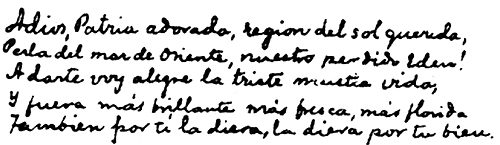
- The autographed first stanza of "Mi último adiós"
- Written: 1896
- Country: Philippines
- Language: Spanish

"Mi último adiós" (transl. "My Last Goodbye") is a poem written by Philippine national hero Dr. José Rizal before his execution by firing squad on December 30, 1896. The piece was one of the last notes he wrote before his death. Another that he had written was found in his shoe, but because the text was illegible, its contents remain a mystery.

Rizal did not ascribe a title to his poem. Mariano Ponce, his friend and fellow reformist, titled it "Mi último pensamiento" (transl. "My Last Thought") in the copies he distributed, but this did not catch on. The "coconut oil lamp" containing the poem was not delivered to Rizal's family until after the execution, as it was required to light the cell.

== Background ==
"On the afternoon of Dec. 29, 1896, a day before his execution, Dr. José Rizal was visited by his mother, Teodora Alonzo; sisters Lucia, Josefa, Trinidád, Maria and Narcisa; and two nephews. When they took their leave, Rizal told Trinidád in English that there was something in the small alcohol stove (cocinilla), as opposed to saying coconut oil lamp (lamparilla), which was intended to provide cover for the transportation of the text. The stove was given to Narcisa by the guard when the party was about to board their carriage in the courtyard. At home, the Rizal ladies recovered a folded paper from the stove. On it was written an unsigned, untitled and undated poem of 14 five-line stanzas. The Rizals reproduced copies of the poem and sent them to Rizal's friends in the country and abroad. In 1897, Mariano Ponce in Hong Kong had the poem printed with the title "Mí último pensamiento". Fr. Mariano Dacanay, who received a copy of the poem while a prisoner in Bilibid (jail), published it in the first issue of La Independencia on September 25, 1898 with the title 'Ultimo Adios'."

== Political impact ==
After it was annexed by the United States as a result of the Spanish–American War, the Philippines was perceived as a community of "barbarians" incapable of self-government. U.S. Representative Henry A. Cooper, lobbying for the management of Philippine affairs, recited the poem before the United States Congress. Realising the nobility of the piece's author, his fellow congressmen enacted the Philippine Bill of 1902, enabling self-government, later known as the Philippine Organic Act of 1902, even though the 1882 Chinese Exclusion Act was still in effect and African Americans had yet to be granted equal rights as U.S. citizens.

It created the Philippine Assembly, appointed two Filipino delegates to the American Congress, extended the US Bill of Rights to Filipinos, and laid the foundation for an autonomous government. The colony was on its way to independence. Full autonomy was granted on July 4, 1946, under the Treaty of Manila.

=== Indonesian nationalism ===
The poem was translated into Indonesian by Rosihan Anwar and was recited by Indonesian soldiers before going into battle during their struggle for independence.

Anwar recalled the circumstances of the translation:

"The situation was favorable to promote nationalism. [On 7 September 1944, Prime Minister Koiso of Japan declared that the 'East Indies' would become independent soon, an announcement that was received enthusiastically throughout the islands, and got ecstatic treatment in Asia Raja the following day.] In that context, I thought it would be good that I could disseminate this story about Jose Rizal among our younger people at that time. It was quite natural; I thought it would be good to tell the story of Jose Rizal, this rebel against the Spanish. And of course the climax, when he was already sentenced to death and then hauled off to face firing squad, and he wrote that [poem] ….”

"I translated it from the English. Because I do not know Spanish. I know French, I know German, but not Spanish. Then, according to the custom at that time, everything you want to say over the radio station or anything you wanted to publish in a newspaper … everything must go first to the censorship. I sent it to [the] censor, no objection, it's okay. Okay. Then I made an arrangement, with my friend, [an] Indonesian friend, who worked at the radio station, where everything was supposed to be supervised by the Japanese. He gave me a chance to read it, which I did …"

He read "Mi último adiós" over the radio in Jakarta on Saturday, December 30, 1944–the 48th anniversary of Rizal's death. That same day, the paper Asia Raja devoted almost half of its back page to a feature and poem on Rizal written by Anwar, accompanied by Anwar's translation.

== Poem ==
Spanish

"Mi último adiós"
original version by José Rizal

Adiós, Patria adorada, región del sol querida,
Perla del mar de oriente, nuestro perdido Edén!
A darte voy alegre la triste mustia vida,
Y fuera más brillante, más fresca, más florida,
También por ti la diera, la diera por tu bien.

En campos de batalla, luchando con delirio,
Otros te dan sus vidas sin dudas, sin pesar;
El sitio nada importa, ciprés, laurel o lirio,
Cadalso o campo abierto, combate o cruel martirio,
Lo mismo es si lo piden la patria y el hogar.

Yo muero cuando veo que el cielo se colora
Y al fin anuncia el día tras lóbrego capuz;
si grana necesitas para teñir tu aurora,
Vierte la sangre mía, derrámala en buen hora
Y dórela un reflejo de su naciente luz.

Mis sueños cuando apenas muchacho adolescente,
Mis sueños cuando joven ya lleno de vigor,
Fueron el verte un día, joya del mar de oriente,
Secos los negros ojos, alta la tersa frente,
Sin ceño, sin arrugas, sin manchas de rubor.

Ensueño de mi vida, mi ardiente vivo anhelo,
¡Salud te grita el alma que pronto va a partir!
¡Salud! Ah, que es hermoso caer por darte vuelo,
Morir por darte vida, morir bajo tu cielo,
Y en tu encantada tierra la eternidad dormir.

Si sobre mi sepulcro vieres brotar un día
Entre la espesa yerba sencilla, humilde flor,
Acércala a tus labios y besa al alma mía,
Y sienta yo en mi frente bajo la tumba fría,
De tu ternura el soplo, de tu hálito el calor.

Deja a la luna verme con luz tranquila y suave,
Deja que el alba envíe su resplandor fugaz,
Deja gemir al viento con su murmullo grave,
Y si desciende y posa sobre mi cruz un ave,
Deja que el ave entone su cántico de paz.

Deja que el sol, ardiendo, las lluvias evapore
Y al cielo tornen puras, con mi clamor en pos;
Deja que un ser amigo mi fin temprano llore
Y en las serenas tardes cuando por mí alguien ore,
¡Ora también, oh Patria, por mi descanso a Dios!

Ora por todos cuantos murieron sin ventura,
Por cuantos padecieron tormentos sin igual,
Por nuestras pobres madres que gimen su amargura;
Por huérfanos y viudas, por presos en tortura
Y ora por ti que veas tu redención final.

Y cuando en noche oscura se envuelva el cementerio
Y solos sólo muertos queden velando allí,
No turbes su reposo, no turbes el misterio,
Tal vez accordes oigas de cítara o salterio,
Soy yo, querida Patria, yo que te canto a ti.

Y cuando ya mi tumba de todos olvidada
No tenga cruz ni piedra que marquen su lugar,
Deja que la are el hombre, la esparza con la azada,
Y mis cenizas, antes que vuelvan a la nada,
El polvo de tu alfombra que vayan a formar.

Entonces nada importa me pongas en olvido.
Tu atmósfera, tu espacio, tus valles cruzaré.
Vibrante y limpia nota seré para tu oído,
Aroma, luz, colores, rumor, canto, gemido,
Constante repitiendo la esencia de mi fe.

Mi patria idolatrada, dolor de mis dolores,
Querida Filipinas, oye el postrer adiós.
Ahí te dejo todo, mis padres, mis amores.
Voy donde no hay esclavos, verdugos ni opresores,
Donde la fe no mata, donde el que reina es Dios.

Adiós, padres y hermanos, trozos del alma mía,
Amigos de la infancia en el perdido hogar,
Dar gracias que descanso del fatigoso día;
Adiós, dulce extranjera, mi amiga, mi alegría,
Adiós, queridos seres, morir es descansar.

English

"My Last Farewell"
translation by Encarnacion Alzona & Isidro Escare Abeto

Farewell, my adored Land, region of the sun caressed,
Pearl of the Orient Sea, our Eden lost,
With gladness I give you my life, sad and repressed;
And were it more brilliant, more fresh and at its best,
I would still give it to you for your welfare at most.

On the fields of battle, in the fury of fight,
Others give you their lives without pain or hesitancy,
The place does not matter: cypress, laurel, lily white;
Scaffold, open field, conflict or martyrdom's site,
It is the same if asked by the home and country.

I die as I see tints on the sky b'gin to show
And at last announce the day, after a gloomy night;
If you need a hue to dye your matutinal glow,
Pour my blood and at the right moment spread it so,
And gild it with a reflection of your nascent light.

My dreams, when scarcely a lad adolescent,
My dreams when already a youth, full of vigor to attain,
Were to see you, Gem of the Sea of the Orient,
Your dark eyes dry, smooth brow held to a high plane,
Without frown, without wrinkles and of shame without stain.

My life's fancy, my ardent, passionate desire,
Hail! Cries out the soul to you, that will soon part from thee;
Hail! How sweet 'tis to fall that fullness you may acquire;
To die to give you life, 'neath your skies to expire,
And in thy mystic land to sleep through eternity!

If over my tomb some day, you would see blow,
A simple humble flow'r amidst thick grasses,
Bring it up to your lips and kiss my soul so,
And under the cold tomb, I may feel on my brow,
Warmth of your breath, a whiff of thy tenderness.

Let the moon with soft, gentle light me descry,
Let the dawn send forth its fleeting, brilliant light,
In murmurs grave allow the wind to sigh,
And should a bird descend on my cross and alight,
Let the bird intone a song of peace o'er my site.

Let the burning sun the raindrops vaporize
And with my clamor behind return pure to the sky;
Let a friend shed tears over my early demise;
And on quiet afternoons when one prays for me on high,
Pray too, oh, my Motherland, that in God may rest I.

Pray thee for all the hapless who have died,
For all those who unequalled torments have undergone;
For our poor mothers who in bitterness have cried;
For orphans, widows and captives to tortures were shied,
And pray too that you may see your own redemption.

And when the dark night wraps the cemet'ry
And only the dead to vigil there are left alone,
Don't disturb their repose, disturb not the mystery:
If thou hear the sounds of cithern or psaltery,
It is I, dear Country, who, a song t'you intone.

And when my grave by all is no more remembered,
With neither cross nor stone to mark its place,
Let it be plowed by man, with spade let it be scattered
And my ashes ere to nothingness are restored,
Let them turn to dust to cover thy earthly space.

Then it doesn't matter that you should forget me:
Your atmosphere, your skies, your vales I'll sweep;
Vibrant and clear note to your ears I shall be:
Aroma, light, hues, murmur, song, moanings deep,
Constantly repeating the essence of the faith I keep.

My idolized Country, for whom I most gravely pine,
Dear Philippines, to my last goodbye, oh, harken
There I leave all: my parents, loves of mine,
I'll go where there are no slaves, tyrants or hangmen
Where faith does not kill and where God alone does reign.

Farewell, parents, brothers, beloved by me,
Friends of my childhood, in the home distressed;
Give thanks that now I rest from the wearisome day;
Farewell, sweet foreigner, my friend, who brightened my way;
Farewell to all I love; to die is to rest.

Tagalog

"Pahimakas ni Dr. José Rizal"
translation by Andrés Bonifacio

Pinipintuho kong Bayan ay paalam,
lupang iniirog ñg sikat ñg araw,
mutiang mahalaga sa dagat Silañgan,
kalualhatiang sa ami'y pumanaw.

Masayang sa iyo'y aking idudulot
ang lanta kong buhay na lubhang malungkot;
maging mariñgal man at labis alindog
sa kagaliñgan mo ay akin ding handog.

Sa pakikidigma at pamimiyapis
ang alay ñg iba'y ang buhay na kipkip,
walang agam-agam, maluag sa dibdib,
matamis sa puso at di ikahapis.

Saan man mautas ay di kailañgan,
cípres ó laurel, lirio ma'y patuñgan
pakikipaghamok, at ang bibitayan,
yaon ay gayon din kung hiling ñg Bayan.

Ako'y mamatay, ñgayong namamalas
na sa silañganan ay namamanaag
yaong maligayang araw na sisikat
sa likod ñg luksang nagtabing na ulap.

Ang kulay na pula kung kinakailañgan
na maitim sa iyong liway-way,
dugo ko'y isabog at siyang ikinang
ñg kislap ñg iyong maningning na ilaw.

Ang aking adhika sapul magkaisip
ñg kasalukuyang bata pang maliit,
ay ang tanghaling ka at minsan masilip
sa dagat Silañgan hiyas na marikit.

Natuyo ang luhang sa mata'y nunukal,
taas na ang noo't walang kapootan,
walang bakás kunot ñg kapighatian
gabahid man duñgis niyong kahihiyan.

Sa kabuhayang ko ang laging gunita
maniñgas na aking ninanasa-nasa
ay guminhawa ka ang hiyaw ñg diwa
pag hiñgang papanaw ñgayong biglang-bigla.

Ikaw'y guminhawa laking kagandahang
ako'y malugmok, at ikaw ay matanghal,
hiniñga'y malagot, mabuhay ka lamang
bangkay ko'y masilong sa iyong Kalañgitan.

Kung sa libiñgang ko'y tumubong mamalas
sa malagong damo mahinhing bulaklak,
sa mañga labi mo'y mangyaring ílapat,
sa kaluluwa ko halik ay igawad.

At sa aking noo nawa'y iparamdam,
sa lamig ñg lupa ñg aking libiñgan,
ang init ñg iyong pag hiñgang dalisay
at simoy ñg iyong pag giliw na tunay.

Bayaang ang buwan sa aki'y ititig
ang liwanag niyang lamlám at tahimik,
liwayway bayaang sa aki'y ihatid
magalaw na sinag at hañging hagibis.

Kung sakasakaling bumabang humantong
sa cruz ko'y dumapo kahi't isang ibon
doon ay bayan humuning hinahon
at dalitin niya payapang panahon.

Bayaan ang niñgas ñg sikat ñg araw
ula'y pasiñgawin noong kainitan,
magbalik sa lañgit ñg boong dalisay
kalakip ñg aking pagdaing na hiyaw.

Bayaang sino man sa katotong giliw
tañgisang maagang sa buhay pagkitil:
kung tungkol sa akin ay may manalañgin
idalañgin Báyan yaring pagka himbing.

Idalañging lahat yaong nañgamatay,
nañgagtiis hirap na walang kapantay;
m̃ga iná naming walang kapalaran
na inahihibik ay kapighatian.

Ang m̃ga bao't pinapañgulila,
ang m̃ga bilangong nagsisipag dusa:
dalañginin namang kanilang mákita
ang kalayaan mong, ikagiginhawa.

At kung ang madilim na gabing mapanglaw
ay lumaganap na doon sa libiñgan't,
tañging m̃ga patay ang nañgag lalamay,
huwag bagabagin ang katahimikan.

Ang kanyang hiwaga'y huwag gambalain:
kaipala'y mariñgig doon ang taginting,
tunog ñg gitara't salterio'y mag saliw,
ako. Báyan, yao't, kita'y aawitin.

Kung ang libiñgan ko'y limót na ñg lahat
at wala ñg kruz at batóng mábakas,
bayang lina~gin ñg taong masipag,
lupa'y asarolin at kanyang ikalat.

At m̃ga buto ko ay bago matunaw
máowi sa wala at kusang maparam,
alabók ñg iyong latag ay bayaang
siya ang babalang doo'y makipisan.

Kung magka gayon na'y aalintanahin
na ako sa limot iyong ihabilin
pagka't himpapawid at ang pañganorin
m̃ga lansañgan mo'y aking lilibutin.

Matining na tunóg ako sa diñgig mo,
ilaw, m̃ga kulay, masamyong pabañgó,
ang úgong at awit, pag hibik sa iyo,
pag asang dalisay ñg pananalig ko.

Báyang iniirog, sákit niyaring hirap,
Katagalugang kong pinakaliliyag,
dingin mo ang aking pagpapahimakas:
diya'y iiwan ko sa iyo ang lahat.

Ako'y patutuñgo sa walang busabos,
walang umiinis at verdugong hayop:
pananalig doo'y di nakasasalot,
si Bathala lamang doo'y haring lubos.

Paalam, magulang at m̃ga kapatid
kapilas ñg aking kaluluwa't dibdib
m̃ga kaibigan bata pang maliit
sa aking tahanan di na masisilip.

Pag pasalamatan at napahiñga rin,
paalam estrañgerang kasuyo ko't aliw.
paalam sa inyo m̃ga ginigiliw:
¡mamatay ay siyang pagkagupiler

== Translations ==
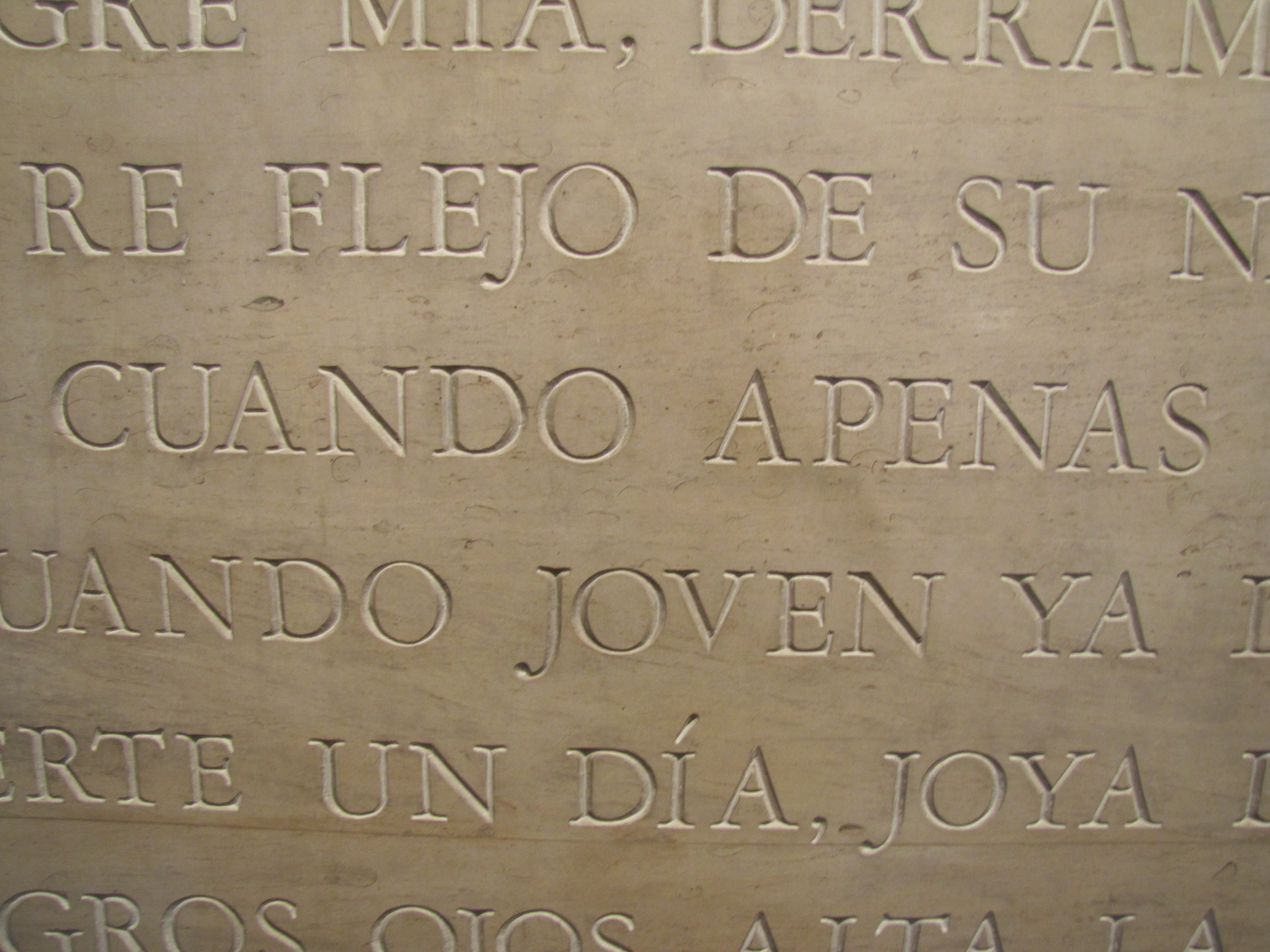
"Mi último adiós" engraved at the Rizal Shrine, Intramuros

"Mi último adiós" is interpreted into 46 Philippine languages, including Filipino Sign Language. As of 2005, at least 35 English translations known and published in print. The first translation of the poem to be published was in the Kapampangan language by Sexmoan native writer Monico R. Mercado which was being worked on in 1897. It was later published in the La Republica Filipina newspaper by Don Pedro Paterno.

Andres Bonifacio created a Tagalog translation of the poem, which was posthumously published in the Kalendariong Tagalog ni Jose Rizal in 1905. The most popular English iteration is the 1911 translation of Charles Derbyshire, inscribed on bronze. Also on bronze at the Rizal Park in Manila, but less known, is the 1944 one of novelist Nick Joaquin.

A translation to Czech was made by former Czech ambassador to the Republic of the Philippines, Jaroslav Ludva, and addressed at the session of the Senát. In 1927, Luis G. Dato translated the poem from Spanish to English in rhymes. Dato called it "Mí último pensamiento". Dato was the first Filipino to translate the poem into English.

== See also ==
- Death poem
- "Sa Aking Mga Kabata"

== Resources ==
- Full Text in Spanish (Mi último adiós)
- Full Text in Tagalog (Huling paalam)
- Full Text in English (My last farewell)
- Spanish to English Comparison by Luis G. Dato
