= A la juventud filipina =

1879 poem written by José Rizal

- by José Rizal
- Country: Philippines
- Language: Spanish
- Publisher: Manila Lyceum of Art and Literature
- Publication date: 1879
- Media type: Print

A la juventud filipina (English Translation: To The Philippine Youth) is a poem written in Spanish by Filipino writer and patriot José Rizal, first presented in 1879 in Manila, while he was studying at the University of Santo Tomas.

"A la juventud filipina" was written by Rizal when he was only eighteen years old, and was dedicated to the Filipino youth which he describes as "the fair hope of my Motherland."

== Summary ==
The poem address the Filipino youth as the one who can bring about change and progress to the nation. It encourages them that they have the potential to achieve great things, "Come now, thou [Youth] genius grand, And bring down inspiration." In this poem, it is the Filipino youth who are the protagonists, whose "prodigious genius" making use of that education to build the future, was the "bella esperanza de la patria mía" (beautiful hope of the motherland). Spain, with "pious and wise hand" offered a "crown's resplendent band, offers to the sons of this Indian land."

== Influences ==
Some literary terms characteristic of the works of José de Espronceda can be observed throughout the poem, such as “tersa frente” or "amante anhelo" that appeared originally in the "Canto II a Teresa" of Espronceda.

== Awards ==
The poem was presented in 1879 in Manila at a literary contest held in the Liceo Artistico Literario de Manila (Manila Lyceum of Art and Literature), a society of literary men and artists, where he won the first prize, composed of a feather-shaped silver pen and a diploma.

== Translations ==
The poem has been translated to Tagalog by several authors. Early in the 20th century, the American translator Charles Derbyshire (whose English translation of Rizal's "Mi Ultimo Adios" is the most popular and most often recited version) translated the poem, but the translation contained flaws, as can be seen for example in the fifth line, where he translates "bella esperanza de la patria mia!" as “fair hope of my fatherland!” Alfredo S. Veloso made a translation of the poem into English. Philippine National Artist Nick Joaquin also translated the poem.

== See also ==
- Sa Aking Mga Kabata, a poem with a similar title purportedly written by Rizal when he was eight years old, but is now considered to be a hoax.
