= Antonio C. Torres =

Filipino police officer and politician (1885-1951)

Sir Antonio C. Torres KGCR
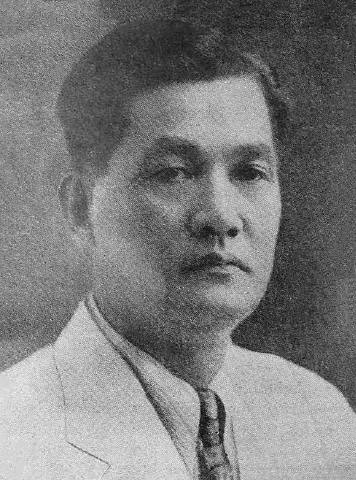
- Torres in 1939

Chief of Manila Police Department
- In office 1936–1945
- Preceded by: Columbus E. Piatt
- Succeeded by: Marcus E. Jones

Personal details
- Born: Antonio C. Torres y Vergara; September 1, 1885 Manila, Captaincy General of the Philippines
- Died: June 1, 1951 (aged 65) Philippines
- Spouse: Corazón Veloso
- Education: Ateneo de Manila
- Known for: First Chief of Manila Police Department; Founder of the Knights of Rizal

Military service
- Branch/service: Philippine National Guard
- Years of service: 1917-1921
- Rank: Koronel (Colonel)

Sir Antonio C. Torres, KGCR, (born Antonio Torres y Vergara; September 1, 1885 – June 1, 1951) founder and first Supreme Commander of the Order of the Knights of Rizal and first Filipino Chief of Police of the Manila Police Department in 1936.

== Early life ==
Torres was born on September 1, 1885, to the Hon. Florentino Torres and Doña Sabina Vergara, in Manila. His father was the first Filipino Attorney-General and one of the first Associate-Justices on the Supreme Court of the Philippines. His mother was from a wealthy Vergara family of Vergara Street Manila.

== Education ==
In 1901, Torres graduated with a Bachelor of Arts from Ateneo de Manila.

In 1902, Torres moved to the United States where he studied law and military science at Cornell University, in New York. In 1903, Torres transferred from Cornell to the National University School of Law, Washington, D.C. There he studied with Secretary Filemon Perez and Vicente Albert. He graduated with a Bachelor of Laws in 1905. At 20 years old he was one of the youngest of the graduating class. He returned to the Philippines the same year and was turned away from the bar examinations for being too young.

== Career ==
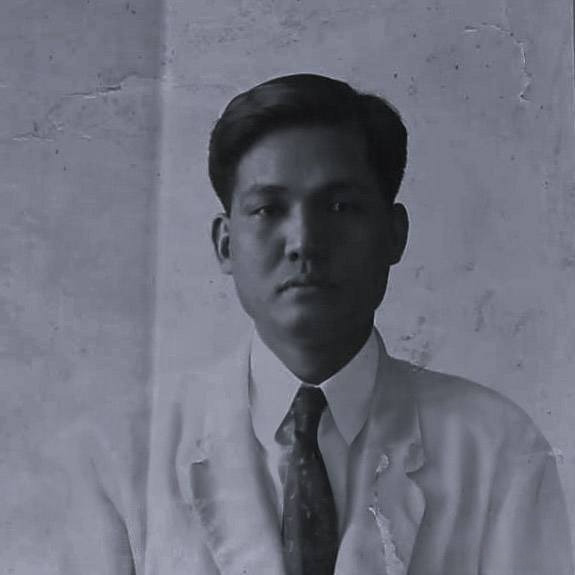
Torres on his U.S. passport application in 1919

Returning from the United States in 1905, Torres was appointed to the statistical division of the Bureau of Customs. There he became acting confidential investigator under Insular Collector McCoy.

In 1906, he organized the first cadet battalions in Manila high schools, with focus in Liceo de Manila and Ateneo de Manila from 1906 to 1908. Battalion cadet commanders under him at the time included future Brigadier-General Guillermo B. Francisco, Justice Mariano Albert, and Senator José Locsín.

In 1909, Torres was elected Sergeant-at-Arms of the First Philippine Assembly led by Speaker Sergio Osmeña. He was later made Social Secretary to the Speaker.

In 1914, Torres left for the United States and visited the Panama–California Exposition in San Francisco. While in the San Francisco he enlisted for field training at Fort Presidio, then under Lt. Gen. James Harbord the former chief of the Philippine Constabulary.

In 1917, Torres returned to the Philippines to join the newly formed Philippine National Guard and was commissioned as a Lieutenant Colonel by Governor-General of the Philippines Francis B. Harrison. In 1919, Speaker Osmeña made Torres his military aide for his tour of Japan, China, and Korea and was given official authority to study local police conditions during the tour. In 1929, Torres toured Europe and the U.S. with recommendations from former Acting Governor-General Eugene Allen Gilmore addressed ti heads of European and U.S. police organisations. These credentials permitted him to study the police systems in both regions.

Torres was a councillor in the Manila City Council before he became the first Filipino Chief of Police of the Manila Police Department on March 3, 1936. On the day of his nomination for Chief of Police, prior to the announcement, he told Harrison, who was then the political advisor of President Quezon and formerly Governor-General of the Philippines, that "My career is ended" to which Harrison replied "...it is just beginning." Vicente Lim, a Colonel at the time, frustrated at not getting the Chief of Police position described Torres to Harrison as "integrity unquestioned; has ideas, but is childish and can't write English, and is a coward."

Around 1940–1941, President Quezon was purging the government of corruption and had the Mayor of Manila Eulogio Rodriguez and Torres report the record of each member of the Manila Police Department. Special investigator, Assistant City Fiscal Francisco Albert, removed corrupt department members from police rookies to captains and majors. In 1941, President Quezon appointed Torres Member of the Traffic Commission.

In 1941, when war broke out Torres declared Manila as an open city.

When the American liberation forces arrived Col. Marcus E. Jones assumed the functions and office of Chief of Manila Police Department on orders from Gen. Douglas MacArthur, who received the request from President Osmeña. Torres shortly served as the Assistant Chief to Jones until he requested in a letter to Jones to be relieved of his duties on March 13, 1945. In his letter to Jones he addressed his continued service as Chief of Police during Japanese occupation:

...it was because the highest representative of the Commonwealth Government... present in Malacañang during the last days of 1941 instructed me and organization to remain in post for the interest of peace and order and protection of life and property of the residents of this city and not because we volunteered our services to the Japanese, and if we continued that service during the last three years it was because there was no other alternative, either we have to be incarcerated or executed.

Despite this, on March 18, 1945, Torres was taken into custody by the Counter Intelligence Corps of the United States Army to be prosecuted for treason in the People's Court for his actions during Japanese occupation. Torres was acquitted of his charges on January 16, 1948.

== Order of the Knights of Rizal ==
On December 30, 1911, Torres gathered nine men to commemorate the execution and martyrdom Jose Rizal. This commemoration continued annually until November 16, 1916, when Torres organized a private non-stock corporation named “Orden de Caballeros de Rizal’, Spanish for Order of the Knights of Rizal. Torres' fellow co-founders were Juan Flameño, Martin P. de Veyra, Jose A. del Barrio and Jose S. Calvez.

== Awards ==
The Philippines:

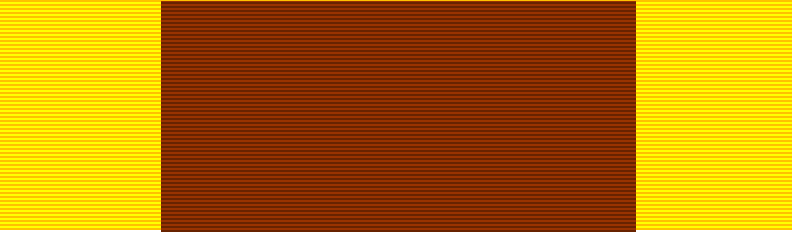
- Supreme Commander and Knight of the Order of the Knights of Rizal.
