= Rizal: Philippine Nationalist and Martyr =

- Book cover for Austin Coates’s Rizal Philippine Nationalist and Martyr .
- Author: Austin Coates
- Language: English
- Genre: Non-fiction
- Publisher: Oxford University Press
- Publication date: 1968
- Publication place: Hong Kong
- Pages: 378
- ISBN: 0-19-581519-X

Rizal: Philippine Nationalist and Martyr is a biography of José Rizal written by British author Austin Coates. The book was published by the Oxford University Press in Hong Kong in 1968.

== Description ==
Coates's Rizal Philippine Nationalist and Martyr is the second biographical account of the life and career of Rizal authored by a non-Filipino (the first was Vida y Escritos del Dr. José Rizal or "Life and Writings of Dr. José Rizal" written by W.E. Retana that was published in 1907, thus Coates's book on Rizal was the first European biography of Rizal since that year). The first-edition copies of the hardcover version of the book were bound in green color, only three of which has José Rizal's monogram stamped on the book cover. One is the file copy at the Oxford University Press. Another copy is owned by Coates himself. The third copy was given as a present to former Philippine President Ferdinand Marcos. Softcover reprints were also available.

Coates's book is considered as one of the "very best biographies" on the Filipino national hero. Coates emphatically explained that Rizal was the "very first exponent" of nationalism in Asia.

== Translation of Rizal’s "Mi Último Adiós" poem ==
In the book, Coates has a translation of Rizal's poem written in the Spanish-language retroactively titled "Mi Último Adiós", translated by scholars into the English as "My Last Farewell". Although not explored enough, it sheds light on Rizal's "final statement," "state of mind," and "intimate view" of the Philippine Revolution before his death by firing squad. Floro Quibuyen discussed and compared Coates's translation of the poem's second stanza to the translation into English made by Nick Joaquín and into the first Tagalog version made by Andrés Bonifacio, with emphasis on the phrase in the second line that says "sin dudas sin pesar". According to Quibuyen, the second stanza of the poem captured Rizal's connection between personal martyrdom and the Philippine Revolution.

The original Spanish is written by Rizal as:

En campos se batalla, lunchando con delirio
Otros te dan sus vidas sin dudas, sin pesar
El sitio nada importa, cipres, laurel o lirio,
Cadalso o campo abierto, combate o cruel martirio,
Lo mismo es si lo piden la Patria y el hogar.

Coates translated the stanza as:

Others are giving you their lives on fields of battle,
Fighting joyfully, without hesitation or thought for the consequence,
How it takes place is not important.
Cypress, laurel or lily,
Scaffold or battlefield, in combat or cruel martyrdom,
It is the same when what is asked of you is for your country and your home

Quibuyen Coates's translation of "sin dudas sin pesar" which says "without hesitation or thought for the consequence." Compared to Joaquin's translation that says "without doubts, without gloom", Quibuyen revealed and described that Coates's interpretation is not only misleading and less closer to Rizal's Spanish original but is a "twist in translation" and not an "innocent stylistic transcription" that enabled Coates to insert his personal estimation about Rizal's ambivalent position towards Philippine Revolution. According to Coates, the second stanza (based on a 1977 lecture by Coates about the poem during a celebration of Rizal Day) that "a war (...) is going on. [Rizal] is [involved] or [connected] to it. [Rizal] admires those who are fighting, but [Rizal] does not entirely agree with what" was being done. Compared to Bonifacio's Tagalog version, "sin dudas, sin pesar" became "walang agam-agam, maluwag sa dibdib" with the addition of the phrase "matamis sa puso at di-ikahapis" that is not available in the versions of Coates, Joaquin, and Rizal's original. In effect, Bonifacio's version of Rizal's poem became "more joyously affirmative". "Walang agam-agam" is equal to Joaquin's "without doubts". However, the phrase "maluwag sa dibdib" is beyond Joaquin's "without gloom" because it encompasses "whole-hearted acceptance" without qualms or worries.

Quibuyen also compared Coates's translation of the third, fourth, and fifth lines of the second stanza of Rizal's final poem to Joaquin's English version and Bonifacio's Tagalog version. Coates's translated El sitio nada importa, cipres, laurel o lirio, / Cadalso o campo abierto, combate o cruel martirio, / Lo mismo es si lo piden la Patria y el hogar as How it takes place is not important. / Cypress, laurel or lily, / Scaffold or battlefield, in combat or cruel martyrdom, / It is the same when what is asked of you is for your country and your home /.
