= Wenceslao Retana =

Spanish polymath (1862–1924)

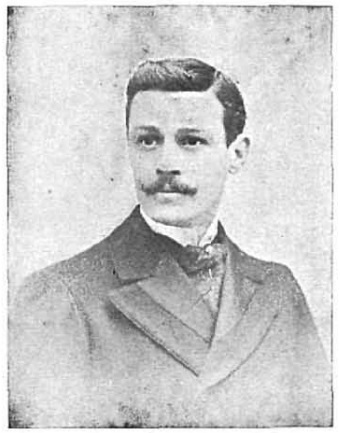
- Retana circa 1901
- Born: Wenceslao Emilio Retana y Gamboa; 28 September 1862; Boadilla del Monte, Spain
- Died: 21 January 1924 (aged 61); Madrid, Spain
- Occupation: Polymath

Academic background
- Education: Academy of Military Engineering of Guadalajara; Real Academia de la Historia

Wenceslao Emilio Retana y Gamboa (28 September 1862 – 21 January 1924), also known as W. E. Retana or Wenceslao E. Retana, was a 19th-century Spanish polymath.

A civil servant, colonial administrator, biographer, political commentator, publisher, bibliographer, and Filipinologist, Retana was a "onetime adversary" of Philippine national hero José Rizal who later became an admirer who wrote the first biographical account of the life of Rizal, entitled Vida y Escritos del Dr. José Rizal (The Life and Writings of Dr. José Rizal). Rosa M. Vallejo described Retana as the "foremost" non-Filipino filipinologist.
