= Austin Coates =

British writer (1922–1997)

Austin Francis Harrison Coates (16 April 1922 – 16 March 1997) was a British civil servant and writer. Coates was a RAF Intelligence officer in World War II, and his service in Burma, India, Singapore and Malaysia was his first time in the Far East. In 1949, he joined the Colonial Service and occupied civil positions in Hong Kong and Malaysia before retiring in 1962 to become a full-time writer. Coates wrote prolifically on Oriental studies and travel, especially on Hong Kong and Macau. His best-known book is Myself a Mandarin (1968), a memoir about his tenure in Hong Kong. In the Philippines, Coates is best known for Rizal: Philippine Nationalist and Martyr (1968), which is still considered one of the best biographies of the de facto national hero.

== Biography ==
=== 1922–1962: Early life and civil service ===
Austin Francis Harrison Coates was born on 16 April 1922 in London, the only child of Eric Coates, a noted composer, and Phyllis Black, an actress. Coates later said that his birth "wreck[ed]" his mother's acting career. He was a nuisance to his parents, especially to his father, who he said was averse to "the prospect of a squalling infant in the house whilst he was trying to write music". The family moved to Hampstead because they felt it would be more suitable for the child. His father's career meant that, except on holidays, Coates would only see him for half an hour every day. When he had the time, Eric taught him the basics of cartography and astronomy.

Coates' first aspirations were towards acting, much like his mother, and he spent two years training at the Royal Academy of Dramatic Art. Through his World War II service in RAF Intelligence, Coates went to Burma, India, Singapore and Malaysia. That was his first time in the Far East; when he visited Bombay (Mumbai), Coates said that he had felt at home from the moment he arrived. In 1949, Coates joined the Colonial Service and began his tenure as Assistant Colonial Secretary in Hong Kong. He disapproved of the double standard the colonial authorities imposed on its subjects. He requested a transfer to Sarawak, Malaysia, in 1957, partly to avoid the tribulations of his superior, K.M.A. Barnett, whose homophobic "hounding" of Coates caused a nervous breakdown. He served as the Chinese magistrate in Sarawak before becoming the governor's secretary and adviser on Chinese affairs. Coates was the First Secretary of the British High Commission, Kuala Lumpur and Penang from 1959 to 1962.

=== 1962–1997: Writings and travels ===
Coates, aged 40, left the Colonial Service in 1962 to become a full-time writer. He wrote extensively on topics related to the Asia-Pacific region, particularly Hong Kong and Macau. In 1965, he settled in Hong Kong and continued travelling and writing extensively.

Coates' best-known work is Myself a Mandarin, a memoir about his tenure in Hong Kong. In its final pages, he wrote, "For a Westerner - or for the West - to believe it is possible in any way to influence China is chimerical. When a Westerner comes to China, no matter how high his rank or how great his influence all that he can achieve - all that he will ever achieve - is to add a grain of salt to sea-water since China, like the sea, is adamantine and of unchanging substance."

In 1968, Oxford University Press published Rizal: Philippine Nationalist and Martyr, Coates' biography of José Rizal. It was the second written by a foreigner, and the ninth overall. Unlike the previous biographies, Coates aimed to show how Rizal's life would be of interest to non-Filipino readers. Casting Rizal as equal to Mahatma Gandhi, Rabindranath Tagore, and Sun Yat-sen, he emphasized the moral purpose which guided Rizal and his martyrdom. It was the work Coates put the most effort into. The book is still considered one of the best biographies of the Filipino national hero, but received little attention outside the Philippines. The Filipino writer F. Sionil José declared it the best, while the public historian Ambeth Ocampo wrote that it "is cited for its readability and insight into Rizal that eluded earlier biographers."

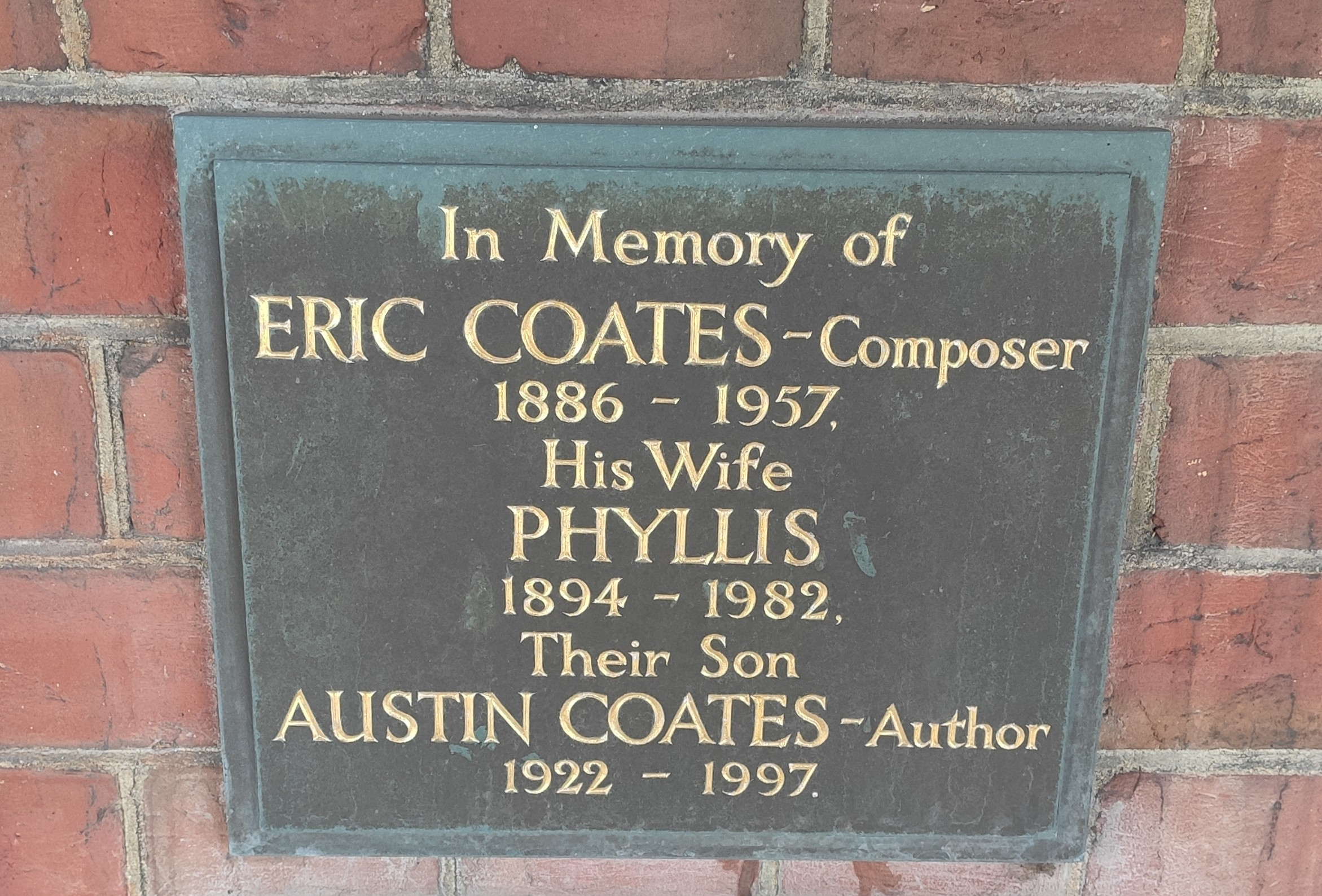
Plaque in memory of Coates and his parents at Golders Green Crematorium, where he was cremated.

Coates was the guest of many prominent Asians, among them the Tagore family, the Indian painter Jamini Roy and Mahatma Gandhi. After his visit with Gandhi, he decided that understanding between East and West was one of the most important goals in the world.

His book, City of Broken Promises was made into an extremely successful musical for the Hong Kong Art Festival in 1978. The show was also staged in San Jose in 1979, starring Teresa Carpio.

In 1993, Coates moved to a villa in Lisbon. He died there on the night of 16 March 1997 after a lengthy fight with cancer. He never married.

== Bibliography ==
=== Travel and history ===
- Invitation to an Eastern Feast, London: Hutchinson, 1953; New York: Harper & Row, 1972
- Personal and Oriental, London: Hutchinson, 1957
- Basutoland, London: H.M.S.O., 1966 (The Corona Library)
- Western Pacific Islands, London: H.M.S.O., 1970 (The Corona Library)
- Islands of the South, London: H.M.S.O., 1970 (The Corona Library); London: Heinemann Educational Books, 1974; New York: Pica Press, 1974

=== History ===
- Portuguese Roots in Africa, Johannesburg: Frier & Munro, 1965
- Prelude to Hong Kong, London: Routledge and Kegan Paul, 1966; second edition as Macao and the British, 1637–1842 Hong Kong: Oxford University Press, 1988 (Echoes: Classics of Hong Kong Culture and History), 234 pp.
- Rizal, Philippine Nationalist and Martyr, Hong Kong: Oxford University Press, 1968; Manila: Solidaridad Publishing House, 1993; Tagalog translation: Rizal, makabayan at martir, Diliman, Quezon City: University of the Philippines Press, 1995 - José Rizal is the national hero of the Philippines.
- China, India and the Ruins of Washington, New York: John Day, 1972 - discusses the longevity of the Chinese and Indian civilisations in contrast to the Western civilisation
- A Mountain of Light: The Story of the Hongkong Electric Company, London: Heinemann, 1977
- A Macao Narrative, Hong Kong: Heinemann Asia, 1978 (Asian Studies Series); Hong Kong: Oxford University Press, 1999, 146 pp., preface by Cesar Guillen-Nunez; Portuguese translation: Macau : calçadas da história, Lisbon: Gradiva and Lisbon: Instituto Cultural de Macau, 1991 (Conhecer o Oriente, 1)
- Whampoa: Ships on the Shore, Hong Kong: South China Morning Post Ltd., 1980, about the founding of the Hongkong & Whampoa Dock Company and the transformation of Hong Kong from a sleepy little village to the seventh biggest port of the world
- China Races, Oxford University Press (China), 1984 (Oxford in Asia Paperbacks) - a history of racing on the China Coast commissioned by the Royal Hong Kong Jockey Club.
- Quick Tidings of Hong Kong, Hong Kong: Oxford University Press, 1990 - a history of telecommunications in Hong Kong.
- The Commerce in Rubber: The First 250 Years, Singapore: Oxford University Press, 1987
- Eric Hamilton, Walter Schofield, S. H. Peplow, Paul Tsui, Austin Coates and James Hayes (John Strickland, ed.), Southern District Officer Reports: Islands and Villages in Rural Hong Kong, 1910-60, Hong Kong University Press, 2010, ISBN 9789888028382.

=== Other non-fiction ===
- Report on the Southern District, Hong Kong: the author, 195? - rural development, Village communities, Southern District New Territories
- Myself a Mandarin, London: Frederick Muller, 1968; Hong Kong: Heinemann Educational Books (Asia), 1975 (Writing in Asia Series) - describes the author's experience as a special magistrate in the New Territories
- Numerology, London: Frederick Muller, 1974; New York: Carol Publishing Group, 1991 - Coates explains his system of reading people's characters and predicting their fortunes based on their names and birth dates

=== Novels ===
- The Road, London: Hutchinson & Co., 1957; Hong Kong University Press, 2009 (Echoes: Classics of Hong Kong Culture and History) - a novel about Hong Kong's Lantau Island during 20th century.
- City of Broken Promises, Hong Kong: Oxford University Press, 1959; 2nd edition 1987; Hong Kong University Press, 2009 (Echoes), 314 pp. - a novel based on the life of Martha Merop, a Chinese orphan in Macao who rose to great success in business and on her liaison with Thomas Kuyck van Mierop, a principal of the British East India Company.

=== Lectures ===
- "The Ultimo Adios as Rizal's Autobiography", in: The Second Annual Jose P. Rizal Lectures, Manila: National Historical Commission, 1969
