= Mayor of Muntinlupa =

Local government head of Muntinlupa, Philippines

- Punong Lungsod ng Muntinlupa
- Seal of the City of Muntinlupa

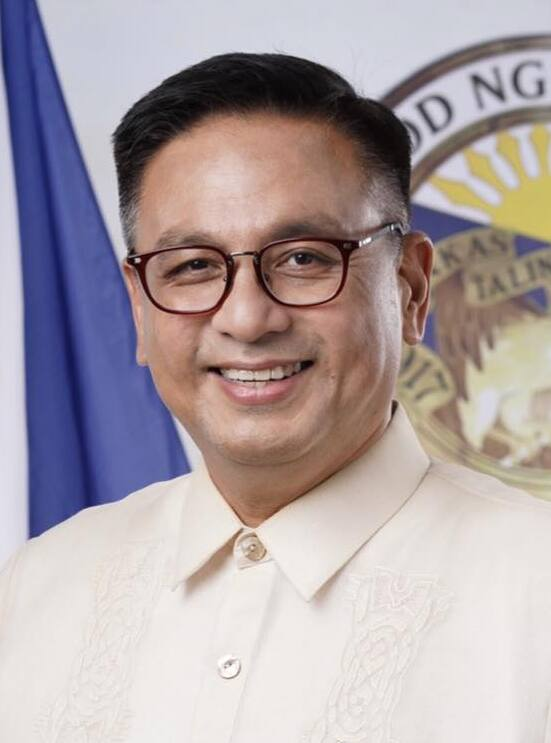
- Incumbent; Ruffy Biazon since June 30, 2022
- Style: The Honorable, Mayor
- Seat: Muntinlupa City Hall, Putatan
- Appointer: Elected via popular vote
- Term length: 3 years, not eligible for re-election immediately after three consecutive terms
- Inaugural holder: Vidal Joaquín
- Formation: 1918
- Website: Official website

The City Mayor of Muntinlupa (Filipino: Punong Lungsod ng Muntinlupa) is the chief executive of Muntinlupa, a highly urbanized city in Metro Manila, Philippines. The mayor oversees city governance, implements city ordinances, administers public services, and represents Muntinlupa at official events. Like all local government heads in the Philippines, the mayor is elected via popular vote, and may not be elected for a fourth consecutive term (although the former mayor may return to office after an interval of one term). In case of death, resignation, or incapacity, the vice mayor becomes the mayor. The city mayor is restricted to three consecutive terms, totaling nine years, and cannot be elected for a fourth consecutive term. However, a mayor can be elected again after an interval of one term. Ruffy Biazon of One Muntinlupa is the incumbent since 2022.

== History ==
Muntinlupa was originally part of the Province of Manila and later Rizal during the Spanish and American colonial eras. It became an independent municipality on January 1, 1918, by virtue of Executive Order No. 108, signed in 1917. It was converted into a highly urbanized city on March 1, 1995, under Republic Act No. 7926.

Following the 1986 EDSA Revolution, Ignacio Bunye was appointed officer-in-charge in June 1986 and later elected in the 1988 municipal elections. Bunye became a founding figure in the city's modern political evolution, serving until the municipality became a city.

Since cityhood, mayoral leadership has alternated among prominent local families, notably the Bunyes, Fresnedis, and Biazons. In May 2025, Ruffy Biazon was re-elected mayor unopposed, with Phanie Teves succeeding as vice mayor.

== List ==
#	Image	Mayor	Years in office	Notes
1		Vidal Joaquín	1918–1919	
2		Primo Ticman	1919–1922	
3		Melencio Espeleta	1922–1924	
4		Pedro Díaz	1925–1930	
5		Tomás Molina	1931–1933	
6		Marciano Arciaga	1934–1936	
7		León Mendiola	1937–1939	
8		Francisco Gilbuena	1945–1945	
*		Baldomero Viñalon	1945–1946	
9		Bonifacio Ticman	1946–1951	
10		Baldomero Viñalon	1952–1959	
11		Francisco de Mesa	1960–1964	Died in office
*		Demetrio Loresca	1964–1964	Acting mayor
12		Maximino Argana	1964–1966	
13		Demetrio Loresca	1966–1971	
*		Maximino Argana	1972–1985	
14		Santiago Carlos	1985–1986	
*		Ignacio Bunye	1986–1987	Acting mayor
*		Victor Aguinaldo	1987–1988	Acting mayor
15		Ignacio Bunye	1988–1998	First city mayor; elected in 1988; re-elected in 1992 and 1995
16		Jaime Fresnedi	1998–2007	Re-elected in 2001 and 2004
17		Aldrin San Pedro	2007–2013	Re-elected in 2010
*		Jaime Fresnedi	2013–2022	Re-elected in 2016 and 2019
18		Ruffy Biazon	2022–present	Re-elected in 2025

== Vice Mayor ==
The Vice Mayor of Muntinlupa presides over the Muntinlupa City Council and assumes executive duties when the mayor is incapacitated or vacant.

=== List ===
#	Vice Mayor	Dates in office	Notes
1	Jaime Fresnedi	June 13, 1986 – December 1, 1987	
–	Antonio Misa Jr.	December 5, 1987 – February 2, 1988	Acting vice mayor
(1)	Jaime Fresnedi	February 2, 1988 – March 21, 1998	Elected in 1988; re-elected in 1992 and 1995
2	Vicente Chua	March 21, 1998 – June 30, 2001	
3	Jojay Alcaraz	June 30, 2001 – June 30, 2004	
4	Aldrin San Pedro	June 30, 2004 – June 30, 2007	
5	Artemio Simundac	June 30, 2007 – June 30, 2016	Re-elected in 2010 and 2013
6	Celso Dioko	June 30, 2016 – June 30, 2019	
(5)	Artemio Simundac	June 30, 2019 – June 30, 2025	Re-elected in 2022
7	Phanie Teves	June 30, 2025–present	First female vice mayor
