= 2025 Muntinlupa local elections =

Local elections in the Philippines

- May 12, 2025
- Mayoral election
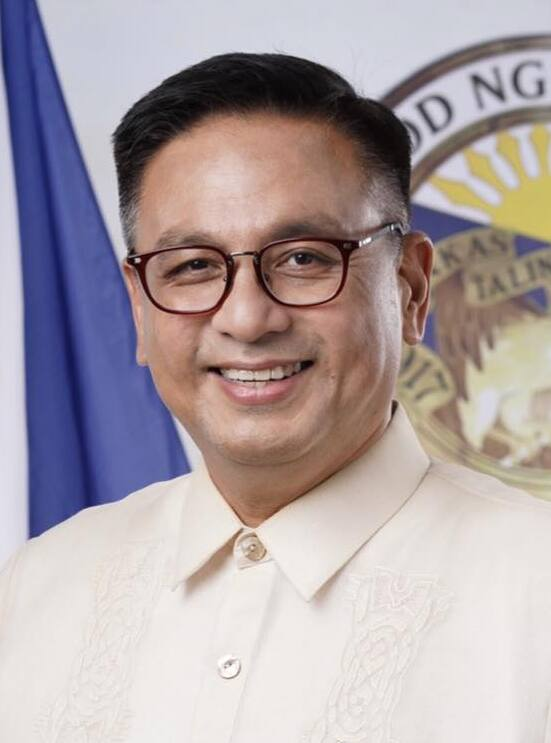
Candidate	Ruffy Biazon
Party	1Munti
Running mate	Allen Ampaya
Popular vote	209,498
Percentage	100.0%
Mayor before election
Ruffy Biazon
1Munti
Elected Mayor
Ruffy Biazon
1Munti
- Vice mayoral election
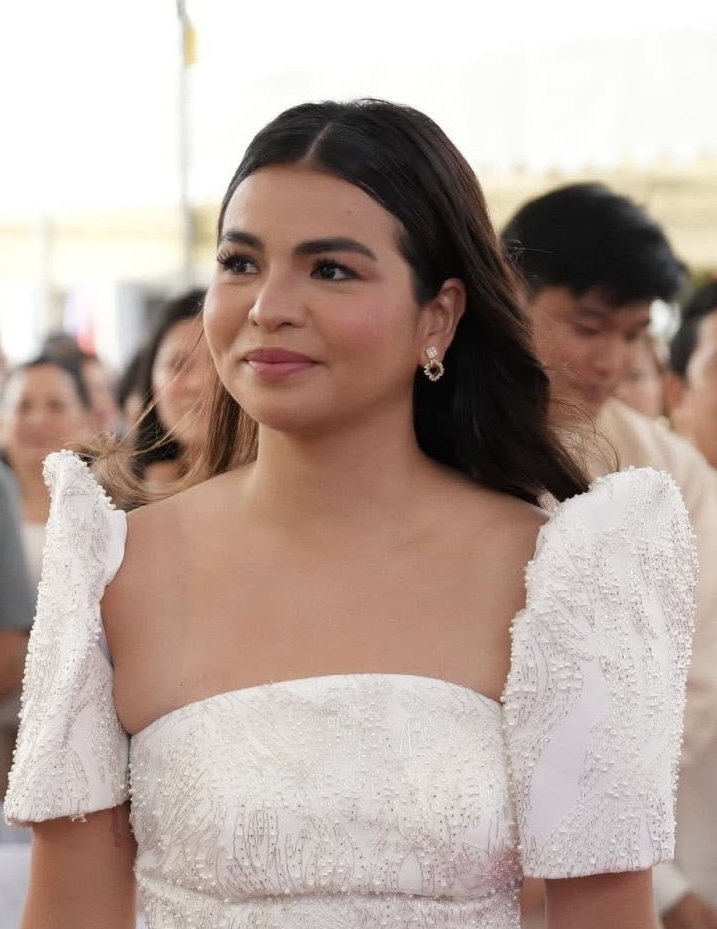
Candidate	Phanie Teves	Allen Ampaya	Temy Simundac
Party	Independent	1Munti	PFP
Popular vote	127,079	88,435	25,003
Percentage	52.84%	36.76%	10.40%
Vice Mayor before election
Temy Simundac
PFP
Elected Vice Mayor
Phanie Teves
Independent
- City Council election

16 of 18 seats in the Muntinlupa City Council 10 seats needed for a majority
	First party	Second party
Party	1Munti	PFP
Last election	16 seats, 75.76%	Did not contest
Seats won	16	0
Seat change	Steady	Steady
Popular vote	1,270,345	162,521
Percentage	80.12%	10.25%

Local elections were held in Muntinlupa on May 12, 2025, as part of the 2025 Philippine general election. The electorate will elect a mayor, a vice mayor, 16 members of the city council, and a district representative to the House of Representatives of the Philippines. The officials elected in the election will assume their respective offices on June 30, 2025, for a three-year-long term.

== Background ==
Muntinlupa's local politics has long been dominated by a few political families, among them the Fresnedis and the Biazons. Incumbent representative Jaime Fresnedi has served as the city's mayor for nearly two decades in total, becoming one of Muntinlupa's longest-serving leaders. His nephew, Jedi Presnedi, is a 1st district councilor seeking re-election in 2025. Fresnedi's wife, Loreta Obong-Fresnedi, had run for mayor in 2007 but lost to then-vice mayor Aldrin San Pedro. The Biazon family has also been prominent in the city's political landscape; incumbent mayor Ruffy Biazon is a son of the late senator Rodolfo Biazon, who represented Muntinlupa in Congress from 2010 to 2016. Ruffy Biazon himself served five terms as the city's lone district representative and even briefly headed the Bureau of Customs before returning to Congress.

Ahead of the 2022 elections, these two political clans forged an alliance under a new local party called One Muntinlupa (1Munti). Fresnedi was then term-limited as mayor and opted to run for Muntinlupa's congressional seat while backing Ruffy Biazon for mayor and their ally Artemio Simundac for vice mayor. Running on a joint One Muntinlupa slate, the Biazon–Fresnedi swept the 2022 local elections: Biazon was elected mayor, Fresnedi won as congressman, and Simundac was re-elected as vice mayor, with their party winning all city council seats in a landslide. This outcome marked a united front in Muntinlupa's leadership, as the newly minted One Muntinlupa party took full control of city hall.

By 2025, however, the composition of the ruling alliance had shifted. Mayor Biazon announced he would seek a second term with a new running mate, Poblacion barangay captain Allen Ampaya. Ampaya, who is a member of the Fresnedi family, served as the president of Muntinlupa's Association of Barangay Captains, and his addition to Biazon's ticket further solidified the partnership between the city's two dominant political families. The One Muntinlupa party formally endorsed Biazon for mayor, Representative Jaime Fresnedi for another term in Congress, and Allen Ampaya for vice mayor in the 2025 elections.

The 2025 Biazon–Fresnedi alliance emerged after incumbent Vice Mayor Artemio Simundac chose to part ways with the local administration. While Simundac was a key figure in 2022, he opted to leave the party for an independent path. This departure was solidified when Simundac filed his candidacy for re-election under President Bongbong Marcos’s Partido Federal ng Pilipinas (PFP) banner, putting him in direct competition with Biazon's new running mate for the vice-mayoral post. In effect, Mayor Biazon's 2025 slate, backed by the One Muntinlupa party, challenged his own incumbent vice mayor—a development that underscored the shifting political dynamics in Muntinlupa since the 2022 polls.

Another prominent political clan in Muntinlupa, the Teves family, has also positioned itself against the Biazon–Fresnedi alliance. Former city councilor Stephanie "Phanie" Teves filed her candidacy for vice mayor in 2025 as an independent, adding a three-cornered fight for that post. In the city council race, Annalie "Thata" Teves ran for a 1st district councilor seat under PFP, joining Simundac's opposition lineup. The Teves clan—which includes former councilors Melchor Teves and Ringo Teves, as well as long-time Putatan barangay captain Danilo "Danny" Teves—has been actively contesting the ruling group's dominance since 2019, often fielding candidates against One Muntinlupa in successive elections.

== Candidates ==
Candidates in italics indicate incumbents seeking re-election.

=== Administration coalition ===
One Muntinlupa
Position	#	Candidate	Party
Mayor	1.	Ruffy Biazon	1Munti
Vice mayor	1.	Allen Ampaya	1Munti
Representative	1.	Jaime Fresnedi	Liberal
Councilor (1st district)	2.	Rachel Arciaga	1Munti
Councilor (1st district)	3.	Walter Arcilla	1Munti
Councilor (1st district)	4.	Paty Katy Boncayao	1Munti
Councilor (1st district)	6.	Amanda Camilon	1Munti
Councilor (1st district)	8.	Raul Corro	1Munti
Councilor (1st district)	11.	Alexson Diaz	1Munti
Councilor (1st district)	15.	Ting Niefes	1Munti
Councilor (1st district)	16.	Jedi Presnedi	1Munti
Councilor (2nd district)	3.	Sha Sha Baes	1Munti
Councilor (2nd district)	4.	Ryan Bagatsing	1Munti
Councilor (2nd district)	6.	Arlene Hilapo	1Munti
Councilor (2nd district)	7.	Reggie Landrito	1Munti
Councilor (2nd district)	11.	Cornelio Martinez	1Munti
Councilor (2nd district)	12.	Dado Moldez	1Munti
Councilor (2nd district)	15.	Kaye Anne Rongavilla	1Munti
Councilor (2nd district)	17.	Jun Metong Sevilla	1Munti

=== Primary opposition coalition ===
Team Simundac
Position	#	Candidate	Party
Vice mayor	2.	Temy Simundac	PFP
Representative	2.	Biyong Garing	PDP
Councilor (1st district)	5.	Rafael Burgos	PFP
Councilor (1st district)	7.	Ed Castalone	PFP
Councilor (1st district)	10.	Ian dela Cruz	PFP
Councilor (1st district)	12.	Emmy Escriba	PFP
Councilor (1st district)	19.	Oby Tensuan	PFP
Councilor (1st district)	20.	Thata Teves	PFP
Councilor (1st district)	22.	Eduardo Villarin	PFP
Councilor (1st district)	23.	Bongbong Virtudazo	PFP
Councilor (2nd district)	1.	Nene Amy Aquino	PFP
Councilor (2nd district)	5.	Elmer Espeleta	PFP
Councilor (2nd district)	8.	Bert Lizardo	PFP
Councilor (2nd district)	10.	Kenneth Macaylas	PFP
Councilor (2nd district)	14.	Lolito Pantaleon	PFP
Councilor (2nd district)	16.	Francia Samson	PFP

=== Other candidates ===
Candidates not in tickets
Position	#	Candidate	Party
Vice mayor	3.	Phanie Teves	Independent
Councilor (1st district)	1.	Eli Anaya	Makabayan
Councilor (1st district)	9.	Myrna dela Concepcion	Makabayan
Councilor (1st district)	13.	Rolly Estupin	Independent
Councilor (1st district)	14.	Santi Mariñas	Independent
Councilor (1st district)	17.	Renato Santos	Independent
Councilor (1st district)	18.	Girome Silpao	Independent
Councilor (1st district)	21.	Rene Valencia	Independent
Councilor (2nd district)	2.	Dhes Arevalo	Independent
Councilor (2nd district)	9.	Tony Mabini	Independent
Councilor (2nd district)	13.	Suma Pacoma	Independent

== Mayoral election ==
Incumbent Ruffy Biazon (One Muntinlupa) ran for a second term unopposed. He was elected with 74.26% of the vote in 2022.

Candidate	Party	Votes	%
Ruffy Biazon (incumbent)	One Muntinlupa	209,498	100.00
Total		209,498	100.00
Source: Commission on Elections

== Vice-mayoral election ==
Incumbent Temy Simundac (Partido Federal ng Pilipinas) ran for a third term. He was re-elected under One Muntinlupa with 57.48% of the vote in 2022.

Simundac ran against Muntinlupa Liga ng mga Barangay president Allen Ampaya (One Muntinlupa) and former Muntinlupa councilor Phanie Teves (Independent).

Candidate	Party	Votes	%
Phanie Teves	Independent	127,079	52.84
Allen Ampaya	One Muntinlupa	88,435	36.77
Artemio Simundac (incumbent)	Partido Federal ng Pilipinas	25,003	10.40
Total		240,517	100.00
Source: Commission on Elections

=== Per Barangay ===
Barangay	Teves		Ampaya		Simundac	
Barangay	Votes	%	Votes	%	Votes	%
Alabang	16,043	53.88	10,440	35.06	3,294	11.06
Ayala Alabang	1,360	24.19	3,338	59.37	924	16.44
Bayanan	12,040	56.68	7,460	35.16	1,733	8.16
Buli	2,947	54.90	2,089	38.92	332	6.18
Cupang	12,787	51.66	8,329	33.65	3,637	14.69
Poblacion	26,298	50.70	21,002	40.49	4,574	8.82
Putatan	27,451	58.76	14,615	31.28	4,655	9.96
Sucat	11,966	50.26	9,116	38.29	2,725	11.45
Tunasan	16,187	51.63	12,038	38.39	3,129	9.98
Total	127,079	52.84	88,435	36.77	25,003	10.40

== House of Representatives election ==
Incumbent Jaime Fresnedi (Liberal Party) ran for a second term. He was elected in 2022 with 77.71% of the vote. One Muntinlupa has endorsed Fresnedi as their representative.

Fresnedi ran against lawyer Silverio "Biyong" Garing (Partido Demokratiko Pilipino), who is the Deputy Secretary-General for the National Capital Region Committee of Partido Demokratiko Pilipino.

Candidate	Party	Votes	%
Jaime Fresnedi (incumbent)	Liberal Party	177,504	75.79
Biyong Garing	Partido Demokratiko Pilipino	56,710	24.21
Total		234,214	100.00
Source: Commission on Elections

== City Council election ==
The Muntinlupa City Council is composed of 18 councilors, 16 of whom are elected.

Party	Votes	%	Seats
One Muntinlupa	1,270,345	80.12	16
Partido Federal ng Pilipinas	162,521	10.25	0
Makabayan	14,861	0.94	0
Independent	137,846	8.69	0
Ex officio seats			2
Total	1,585,573	100.00	18

=== 1st district ===
Muntinlupa's 1st councilor district consists of the barangays of Bayanan, Poblacion, Putatan, and Tunasan. Eight councilors were elected from this councilor district.

A total of 23 candidates were included in the ballot, 6 of whom were incumbents seeking re-election.

Candidate	Party	Votes	%
Alexson Diaz (incumbent)	One Muntinlupa	119,086	75.76
Raul Corro (incumbent)	One Muntinlupa	117,219	74.57
Rachel Arciaga (incumbent)	One Muntinlupa	115,378	73.40
Paty Katy Boncayao (incumbent)	One Muntinlupa	111,329	70.83
Jedi Presnedi (incumbent)	One Muntinlupa	95,235	60.59
Walter Arcilla	One Muntinlupa	89,305	56.81
Ting Niefes (incumbent)	One Muntinlupa	89,000	56.62
Amanda Camilon	One Muntinlupa	81,406	51.79
Thata Teves	Partido Federal ng Pilipinas	72,116	45.88
Santi Mariñas	Independent	45,863	29.18
Rolly Estupin	Independent	18,130	11.53
Eli Anaya	Makabayan	8,934	5.68
Oby Tensuan	Partido Federal ng Pilipinas	7,180	4.57
Myrna dela Concepcion	Makabayan	5,927	3.77
Rafael Burgos	Partido Federal ng Pilipinas	5,466	3.48
Eduardo Villarin	Partido Federal ng Pilipinas	5,316	3.38
Renato Santos	Independent	4,795	3.05
Ian dela Cruz	Partido Federal ng Pilipinas	4,757	3.03
Bongbong Virtudazo	Partido Federal ng Pilipinas	4,542	2.89
Ed Castalone	Partido Federal ng Pilipinas	4,223	2.69
Rene Valencia	Independent	4,225	2.69
Emmy Escriba	Partido Federal ng Pilipinas	4,143	2.64
Girome Silpao	Independent	2,889	1.84
Total		1,016,464	100.00
Source: Commission on Elections

=== 2nd district ===
Muntinlupa's 2nd councilor district consists of the barangays of Alabang, Ayala Alabang, Buli, Cupang, and Sucat. Eight councilors were elected from this councilor district.

A total of 17 candidates were included in the ballot, 5 of whom were incumbents seeking re-election.

Candidate	Party	Votes	%
Reggie Landrito	One Muntinlupa	61,464	65.75
Jun Metong Sevilla (incumbent)	One Muntinlupa	60,105	64.29
Kaye Anne Rongavilla	One Muntinlupa	57,343	61.34
Ryan Bagatsing (incumbent)	One Muntinlupa	56,451	60.39
Arlene Hilapo (incumbent)	One Muntinlupa	55,917	59.81
Sha Sha Baes	One Muntinlupa	55,826	59.72
Dado Moldez (incumbent)	One Muntinlupa	53,912	57.67
Cornelio Martinez (incumbent)	One Muntinlupa	51,369	54.95
Dhes Arevalo	Independent	50,784	54.32
Elmer Espeleta	Partido Federal ng Pilipinas	25,086	26.83
Bert Lizardo	Partido Federal ng Pilipinas	7,926	8.48
Nene Amy Aquino	Partido Federal ng Pilipinas	7,550	8.08
Tony Mabini	Independent	6,290	6.73
Francia Samson	Partido Federal ng Pilipinas	5,196	5.56
Kenneth Macaylas	Partido Federal ng Pilipinas	4,953	5.30
Suma Pacoma	Independent	4,870	5.21
Lolito Pantaleon	Partido Federal ng Pilipinas	4,067	4.35
Total		569,109	100.00
Source: Commission on Elections

== See also ==
- 2025 Philippine local elections in Metro Manila
