= Phanie Teves =

Filipino politician

The Honorable Phanie Teves
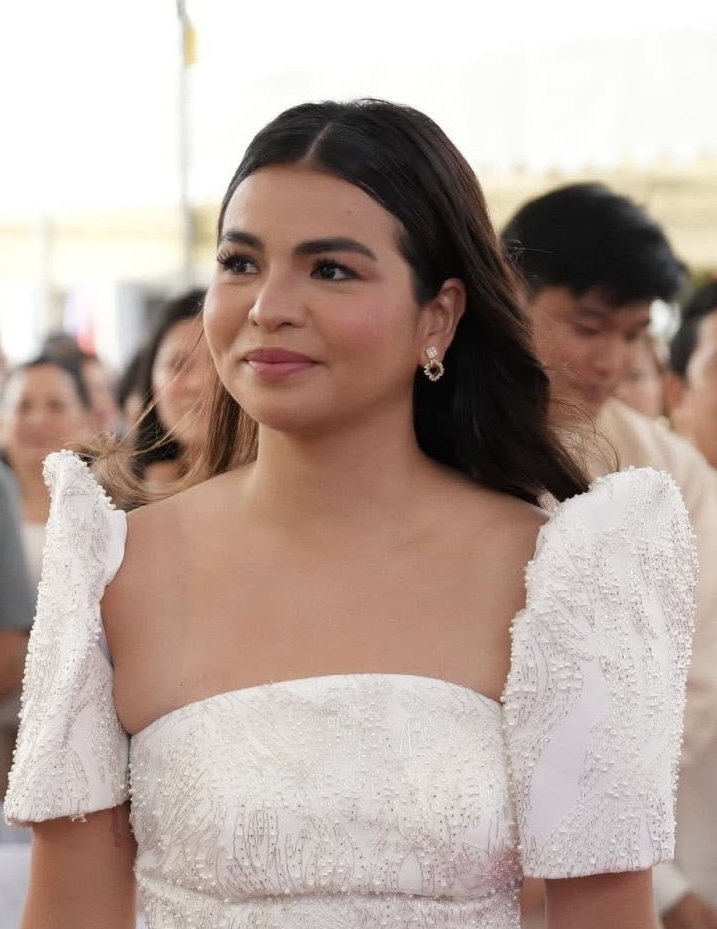
- Teves in 2025

Vice Mayor of Muntinlupa
- Incumbent
- Assumed office June 30, 2025
- Mayor: Ruffy Biazon
- Preceded by: Artemio Simundac

Municipal Administrator of Naujan
- In office August 14, 2023 – September 27, 2024
- Mayor: Henry Joel Teves

Member of the Muntinlupa City Council from the 1st district
- In office June 30, 2013 – June 30, 2022

Personal details
- Born: Stephanie Galan Teves; June 2, 1988 (age 38) Muntinlupa, Philippines
- Party: Independent (2025–present)
- Other political affiliations: NUP (2018–2024); Liberal (2012–2018)
- Spouse: Mak Wong (m. 2021)
- Children: 3
- Education: San Beda College Alabang (BS); Ateneo de Manila University (MPM)
- Occupation: Politician; entrepreneur
- Profession: Businesswoman

Stephanie "Phanie" Galan Teves-Wong (born June 2, 1988) is a Filipino businesswoman and politician who has served as the vice mayor of Muntinlupa, Metro Manila, since 2025. She is the city's first female vice mayor. Teves previously served as the appointed municipal administrator of Naujan, Oriental Mindoro (2023–2024), and as a three-term councilor from Muntinlupa's 1st district (2013–2022).

== Early life ==
Stephanie Galan Teves was born on June 2, 1988, in the then-municipality of Muntinlupa, Metro Manila, Philippines. Her father is incumbent Naujan mayor Henry Joel Teves. Her grandfather, Danilo "Danny" Teves, was a long-time barangay captain of Putatan, Muntinlupa, while her uncle, Gerardo "Gerry" Teves, is the incumbent barangay captain. She is also related to former councilors Melchor "Mel" Teves, Ringo Teves, and Annalie "Thata" Teves.

Teves earned a bachelor's degree in entrepreneurial management at San Beda College Alabang and later obtained a master's in public management from the Ateneo de Manila University's School of Government, graduating in 2018.

== Muntinlupa councilor (2013–2022) ==
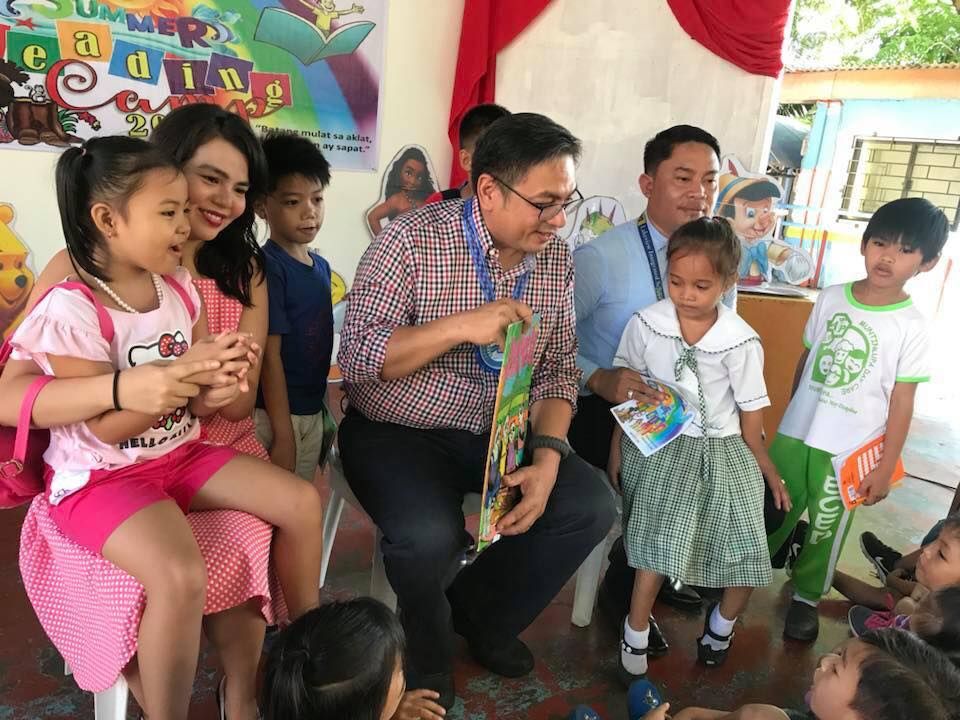
Teves (left) joining Representative Ruffy Biazon (center) reading to schoolchildren in Putatan, Muntinlupa, in 2018

Representing Muntinlupa's first district, Teves was first elected to the city council in 2013 at the age of 25 and subsequently re-elected in 2016 and 2019, completing the maximum three consecutive terms allowed for local officials. She was one of the youngest female councilors in the city when first elected in 2013. Throughout her tenure, Teves focused on legislation in the areas of education, health, social welfare, and community development. By her third term (2019–2022), she had become one of the senior members of the city council and was recognized by her peers for effective and dedicated service, culminating in a 2022 city council resolution commending her contributions over nine years.

In 2013 and 2016, Teves ran for councilor under the Liberal Party (LP) banner that endorsed Jaime Fresnedi's successful mayoral runs. In 2019, she shifted to the National Unity Party (NUP) that endorsed former Bureau of Immigration ports chief Red Mariñas's unsuccessful mayoral bid against Mayor Fresnedi.

=== Legislative initiatives ===
==== Education ====
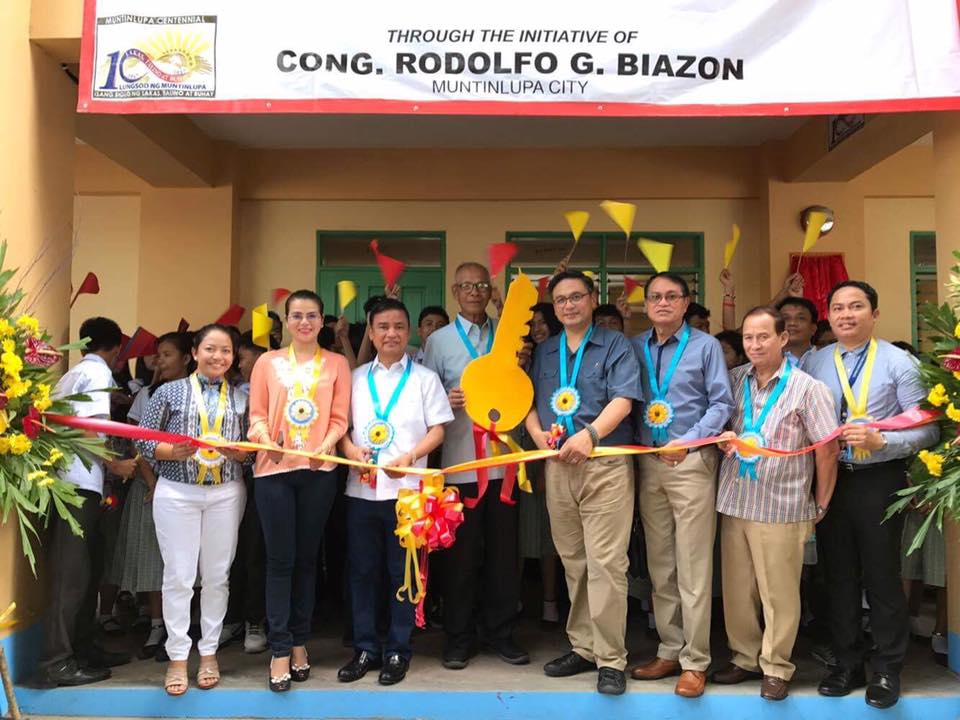
Teves (in peach) with Muntinlupa mayor Jaime Fresnedi, former representative Rodolfo Biazon, Representative Ruffy Biazon, and other city officials during the inauguration of a school building in Putatan, Muntinlupa, in February 2017

Teves was the principal author of an ordinance expanding Muntinlupa's scholarship program to cover students from elementary and high school through college, providing financial assistance and incentives to deserving youth. This Expanded Comprehensive Scholarship and Incentive Program (enacted in 2013) built on the city's existing "Iskolar ng Bayan" (transl. "Scholar of the Country") college scholarship by extending aid to elementary and high school students to prevent dropouts due to financial hardship. The expanded program eventually covered basic through tertiary education (including technical/vocational tracks and graduate studies) and introduced rewards for academic achievers. In a related effort, Teves also authored City Ordinance No. 18-183 in 2018, which established the Pamantasan ng Lungsod ng Muntinlupa (PLMun) Educational Assistance Program to support students of the city-run university. This ordinance created various incentive schemes, such as grants for academic excellence, leadership, athletics, and board exam review assistance, to encourage student achievement and assist financially needy PLMun students.

She also authored ordinances granting allowances to Muslim teachers ("Asatidz") and to all public school teachers in elementary and high schools across the city.

Teves played a key role in the establishment of the Colegio de Muntinlupa, drafting the ordinance that formally created the institution in 2017. She also supported the institutionalization of the Alternative Learning System (ALS) in the city.

In addition to these initiatives, Teves introduced ordinances that led to the recognition and renaming of various educational institutions, including the creation of Poblacion National High School, Tunasan National High School, Sucat Senior High School, Cupang Senior High School, and Lakeview Integrated School in Putatan.

==== Other areas ====
In 2015, she co-authored Ordinance No. 15-146, a comprehensive measure for the prevention and control of HIV/AIDS and other sexually transmitted infections in Muntinlupa. This law created the Muntinlupa City Local AIDS Council and laid out policies for education, prevention, and treatment. She also advocated for senior citizens' welfare—notably, she was among the proponents of Ordinance No. 17-109 (passed in 2017), which granted additional monthly allowances to elderly residents who reach 90 years old and above. This ordinance institutionalized financial support for nonagenarians and centenarians as a form of social service benefit. In the arena of community economic development, Teves lent her support to foundational legislation like the city's investment code (2015) and a comprehensive environment code (2018), both aimed at sustainable community growth (these measures were enacted with broad council support across party lines, including Teves as co-sponsor).

Teves co-sponsored Ordinance No. 2020-136, which created the Online Registration Program for Youths (ORPY). This ordinance established a citywide online youth database to facilitate more effective youth programs and services by the local government. The ORPY was meant to intensify data gathering on Muntinlupa's young constituents in coordination with the Youth Affairs and Sports Development Office and youth council, thereby guiding policies aligned with the Philippine Youth Development Plan. Teves also supported values formation and civic awareness among students—for example, she was one of the sponsors of the 2019 "Munting Panata" (transl. "Little Pledge") ordinance, which introduced a daily recitation of a civic pledge in schools to instill patriotism and good values in elementary and high school students.

=== Council and national roles ===
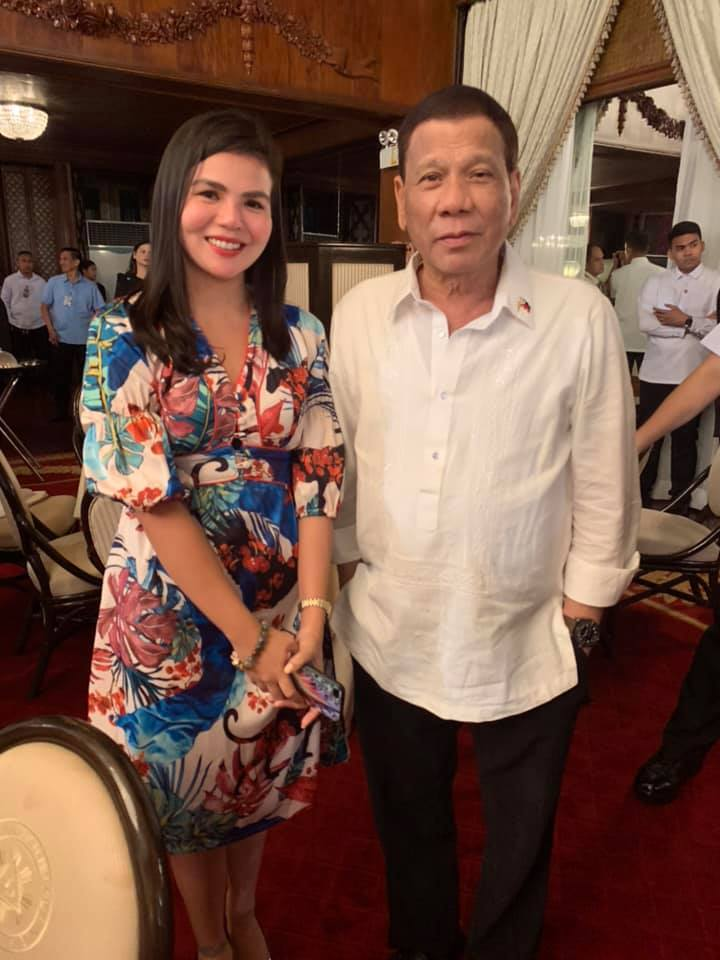
Teves with President Rodrigo Duterte at Malacañang Palace in August 2019

Teves served for multiple years as chairperson of the Committee on Education, where she oversaw legislation and programs related to schools, scholarships, and youth development. In this capacity, Teves became a member of the city's local school board and even sat on the Board of Regents of the Pamantasan ng Lungsod ng Muntinlupa (by virtue of her committee chairmanship), helping align council policies with educational needs. She also chaired the Committee on Communication and Public Affairs, handling matters of public information and media relations for the city government.

Teves held several national-level positions during her career. She served as interim treasurer of the Union of Local Authorities of the Philippines (ULAP) from 2019 to 2022, interim vice president of the Lady Legislators League of the Philippines (4L) during the same period, and as vice president of the National Movement of Young Legislators (NMYL) for the National Capital Region (2019–2022). She was also a board director for Luzon in the Lady Legislators League from 2016 to 2019.

Teves was chosen as the Minority Floor Leader in the 8th City Council during her final term (2019–2022). In a 2022 city council resolution, her colleagues noted her "dynamic performance" and statesmanship in this capacity.

=== Programs and advocacy work ===
As Education Committee chair, she was a proponent of Muntinlupa's scholarship and student excellence initiatives. She helped oversee the implementation of the expanded scholarship and incentive programs, which by the late 2010s were benefitting students from public elementary schools up to the city university. Teves was part of the steering committee for Muntinlupa's annual Ten Most Outstanding Students (10MOST) awards, a program recognizing exceptional high school students in the city. In 2018, she co-chaired the 10MOST selection committee (as the city council's education representative), working with local educators and officials to honor youth achievers and inspire academic excellence.

After helping create the Muntinlupa Local AIDS Council via ordinance, she supported its awareness campaigns and the rollout of community-based seminars on HIV/AIDS prevention (in coordination with the City Health Office) to ensure the ordinance's intent was realized.

In 2017, Teves represented Mayor Jaime Fresnedi to receive a Model Local Chief Executive Award on his behalf from a national education accreditation body.

== Naujan administrator (2023–2024) ==
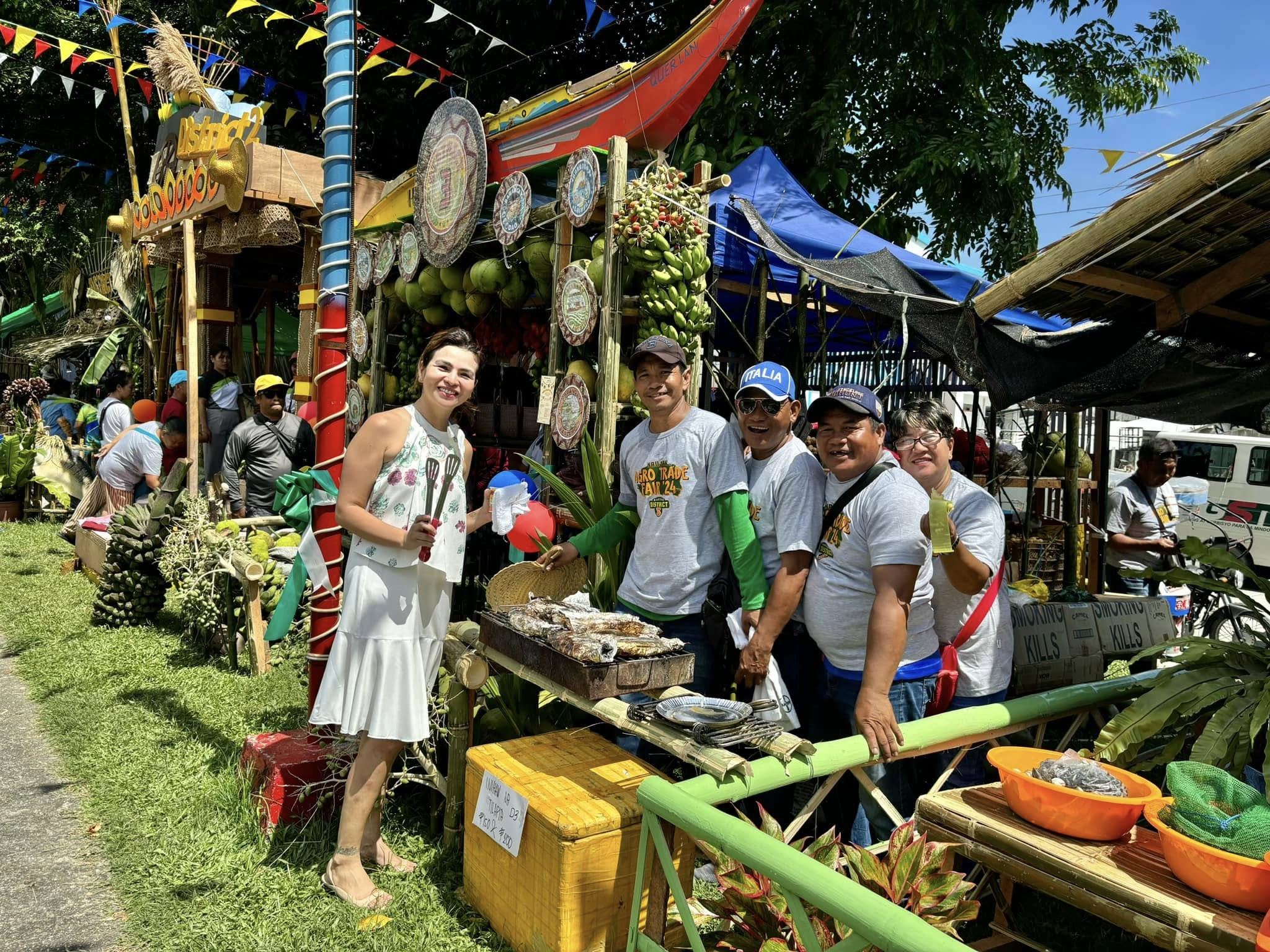
Teves at an agriculture trade fair in Naujan in September 2024

On August 14, 2023, Teves was appointed as the municipal administrator of Naujan, Oriental Mindoro, by her father, Mayor Henry Joel Teves. She was tasked with assisting the mayor in managing day-to-day governance and public services. The municipal administrator's office "exercises general supervision and control over all municipal government departments and sections" to ensure the effective delivery of basic services.

In 2023, Naujan implemented the Department of Information and Communications Technology's eLGU system (Electronic Local Government Unit system) to streamline business permitting and local transactions. This digital initiative, overseen by the municipal government during Teves's administration, led to a surge in business registrations and local revenue by 2024. Official data showed that the number of registered businesses in Naujan jumped from 2,167 in 2022 to 2,779 in 2023 and was projected to reach nearly 2,975 by 2024. Correspondingly, annual revenue from business taxes rose from an average of ₱6 million (US$108,000) pre-digitalization to over ₱10 million ($180,000) in 2023. A Naujan official credited the 23.9% increase in business tax revenue and expansion of the local business base to the successful rollout of the eLGU electronic Business Permit and Licensing System, an effort that Teves, as administrator, helped facilitate.

Teves participated in initiatives to boost Naujan's local economy and services. For instance, she was involved in preparations for the opening of SM Savemore Naujan, the town's first major supermarket, which launched in June 2024.

As administrator, Teves also engaged in partnerships and programs for community development and environmental protection. In August 2024, she led the formal acceptance of a donation of coral reef monitoring equipment from the ABS-CBN Foundation to the Naujan government following the MT Princess Empress oil spill. This equipment, including an underwater camera, mobile phones for "citizen scientist" volunteers, buoys, and snorkeling gear, was provided to help Naujan monitor and rehabilitate its coastal and marine resources. Teves formally received the donation on behalf of the town, emphasizing that the new tools would enable continuous marine environmental monitoring and evidence-based conservation strategies for Naujan's coastal areas.

On September 17, 2024, Teves resigned as municipal administrator. She stepped down from her role on September 27.

== Vice Mayor of Muntinlupa (since 2025) ==
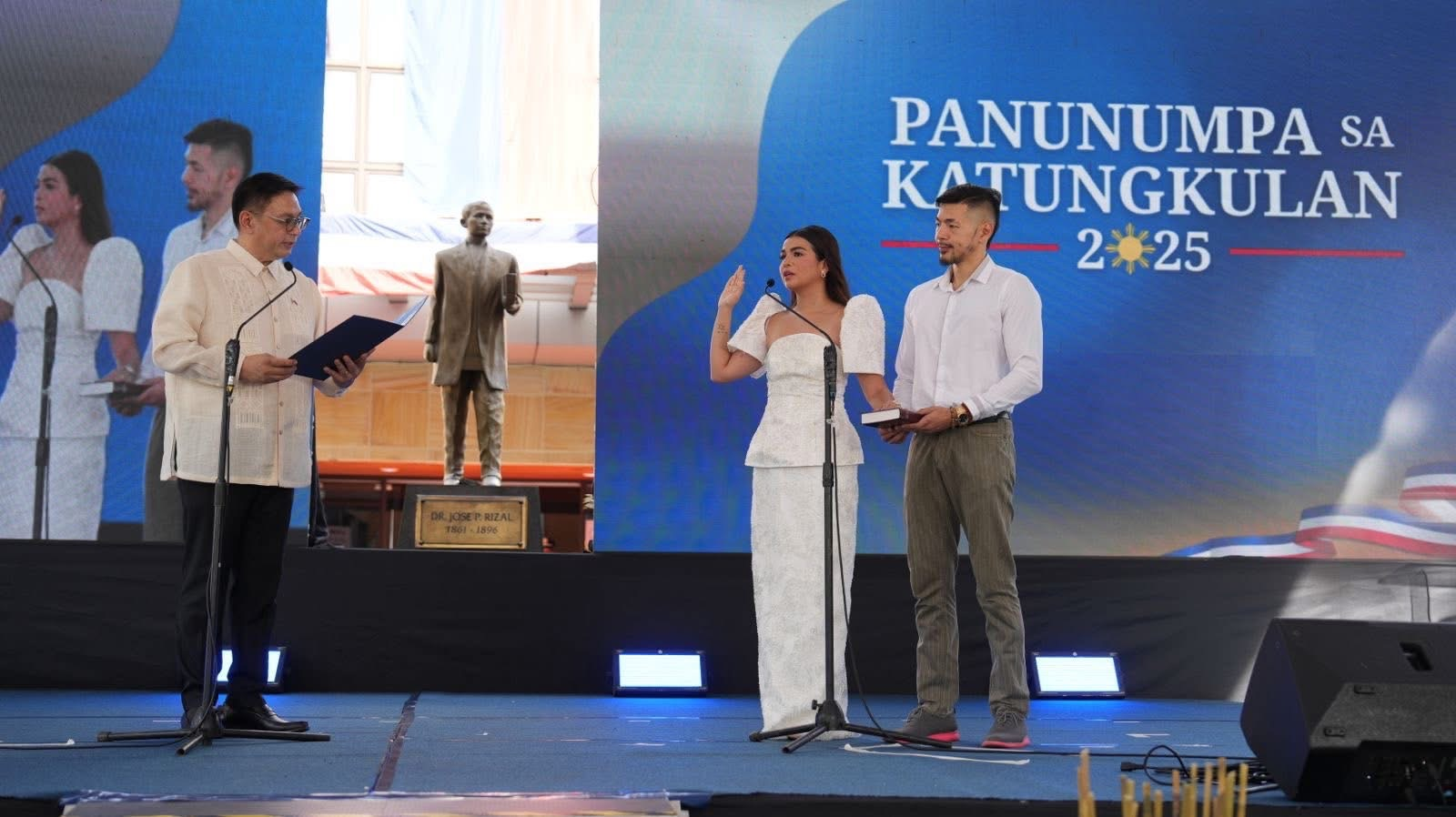
Teves taking her oath as Vice Mayor of Muntinlupa before Mayor Ruffy Biazon on June 30, 2025

In early October 2024, Teves publicly confirmed her candidacy for vice mayor of Muntinlupa in the May 12, 2025 local elections. She filed her certificate of candidacy with the Commission on Elections, registering as an independent candidate. The 2025 vice mayoral contest featured a three-way race: incumbent Vice Mayor Artemio "Temy" Simundac (Partido Federal ng Pilipinas), One Muntinlupa's barangay leader Allen Fresnedi-Ampaya, and Teves as an independent. Teves's campaign emphasized transparency in governance, education reform, and community development.

On May 12, 2025, the Commission on Elections conducted the polls. Preliminary results showed Teves leading the count, finishing with 127,079 votes, or 52.84 percent of the total vice mayoral vote—surpassing Ampaya, who received 88,435 votes (36.77 percent), and Simundac, who received 25,003 votes (10.40 percent).

She was officially proclaimed winner by the members of the Muntinlupa City Board of Canvassers in the early morning of May 13, 2025. Teves thus became Muntinlupa's first woman vice mayor and the first independent candidate to win a citywide elected post in Muntinlupa since the establishment of One Muntinlupa's political dominance in 2022. She was also the only candidate not under One Muntinlupa to have been elected in the 2025 local elections.

== Personal life ==
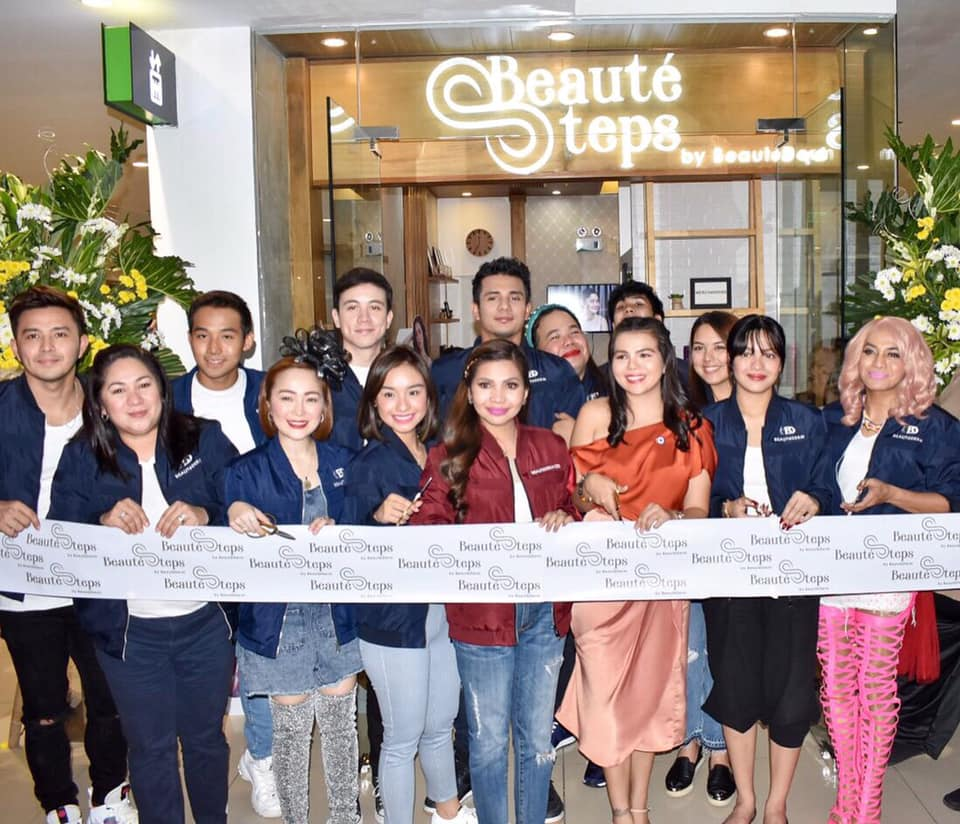
Teves (in orange) during the inauguration of her store, Beautésteps by Beautéderm, in September 2019

Teves married businessman Mak Wong in 2021. They have two sons together. She also has a daughter from a previous relationship.

Teves owns Beautésteps by Beautéderm, a beauty store at South Park Center, Alabang.

She is also a yoga instructor.

== Electoral history ==
=== 2025 (vice mayor) ===
Candidate	Party	Votes	%
Phanie Teves	Independent	127,079	52.84
Allen Ampaya	One Muntinlupa	88,435	36.77
Artemio Simundac (incumbent)	Partido Federal ng Pilipinas	25,003	10.40
Total		240,517	100.00
Registered voters/turnout		314,934	–
Independent gain from Partido Federal ng Pilipinas			
Source: Commission on Elections

=== 2019 (councilor) ===
Muntinlupa council elections—1st district
Party	Candidate	Votes	%
PDP–Laban	Raul Corro	97,183	10.25
Liberal	Alexson Diaz	91,643	9.66
Liberal	Paty Katy Boncayao	90,098	9.50
Liberal	Louie Arciaga (incumbent)	80,886	8.53
Liberal	Allan Camilon	78,854	8.31
Liberal	Ting Niefes (incumbent)	68,715	7.24
NUP	Phanie Teves (incumbent)	68,349	7.21
NUP	Ivee Arciaga-Tadefa (incumbent)	63,240	6.67
Liberal	Nicanor Echavez	58,325	6.15
PDP–Laban	Melchor Teves	57,555	6.07
NUP	Ning Calalang	39,823	4.20
NUP	Mai Maligaya-Mangudadatu	37,087	3.91
NUP	King Marquez	27,225	2.87
NUP	Jay Dolleton	24,194	2.55
Independent	Danny Carandang	15,305	1.61
NUP	Joshua Sebastian	14,265	1.50
NUP	Caloy Casaldon	12,569	1.33
Independent	Ryan de la Cruz	6,587	0.69
WPP	Evelyn Sanchez	3,896	0.41
PDDS	Jojo Regala	3,613	0.38
Independent	Tristan Dimatulac	3,231	0.34
WPP	Sonnyboy Nava	2,205	0.23
PDDS	Churchill de Lara	2,165	0.23
WPP	Timrich Gabriel	1,537	0.16
Total votes		948,550	100.00
Source: Commission on Elections

=== 2016 (councilor) ===
Muntinlupa council elections—1st district
Party	Candidate	Votes	%
Liberal	Patricio Boncayao Jr. (incumbent)	76,956	8.54
Liberal	Bal Niefes (incumbent)	75,617	8.40
Liberal	Phanie Teves (incumbent)	72,993	8.10
Liberal	Allan Camilon	68,243	7.58
Liberal	Ringo Teves (incumbent)	65,201	7.24
Liberal	Louie Arciaga (incumbent)	63,583	7.06
UNA	Alex Diaz (incumbent)	56,394	6.26
UNA	Ivee Arciaga-Tadefa	55,557	6.17
Liberal	Bong Cruz	52,217	5.80
Liberal	Danny Carandang	36,790	4.08
Independent	Johnson San Pedro	35,382	3.93
UNA	Rommel Abanto	35,060	3.89
UNA	Allan Paule De Guzman	33,228	3.69
UNA	King Marquez	30,365	3.37
UNA	Erick Ramirez	30,215	3.35
UNA	Ave Marmeto	22,775	2.53
UNA	Pastor Neil Varias	22,337	2.48
NPC	Alex Borja	14,276	1.58
NPC	Edwin Arciaga	12,708	1.41
NPC	Jones Espeleta	11,671	1.30
NPC	Naomi Estrada	5,862	0.65
NPC	James Solchaga	4,882	0.54
NPC	Jean Zarceno	4,213	0.47
NPC	Romwell Dumag	3,981	0.44
PDP–Laban	Christian Gravador	3,703	0.41
Independent	Ed Molina	3,520	0.39
Independent	Ma. Arlene Paningasan	2,918	0.32
Total votes		900,652	100.00
Source: Commission on Elections

=== 2013 (councilor) ===
Muntinlupa council elections—1st district
Party	Candidate	Votes	%
UNA	Raul Corro (incumbent)	57,911	9.23
Liberal	Patricio Boncayao Jr. (incumbent)	50,604	8.06
Liberal	Phanie Teves	47,831	7.62
UNA	Bal Niefes (incumbent)	47,779	7.61
Liberal	Louie Arciaga	43,800	6.98
UNA	Ringo Teves (incumbent)	42,955	6.85
UNA	Amy Patdu-Labios (incumbent)	42,871	6.83
UNA	Alex Diaz (incumbent)	39,171	6.24
Liberal	Carlo Argana	37,579	5.99
Liberal	Rosalinda Smith	34,901	5.56
UNA	Bobby Barlis (incumbent)	34,715	5.53
UNA	Ike dela Rea	30,490	4.86
Liberal	Allan Paule De Guzman	30,381	4.84
UNA	Athan Gutierrez	29,613	4.72
Liberal	Norberto Espeleta	28,473	4.54
Liberal	Erick Lorica	28,459	4.53
Total votes		627,533	100.00
Source: Commission on Elections

Political offices
Preceded by Artemio Simundac	Vice Mayor of Muntinlupa; 2025–present	Incumbent
