= 2016 Muntinlupa local elections =

Philippine election

2016 Muntinlupa mayoral election
← 2013	May 9, 2016	2019 →
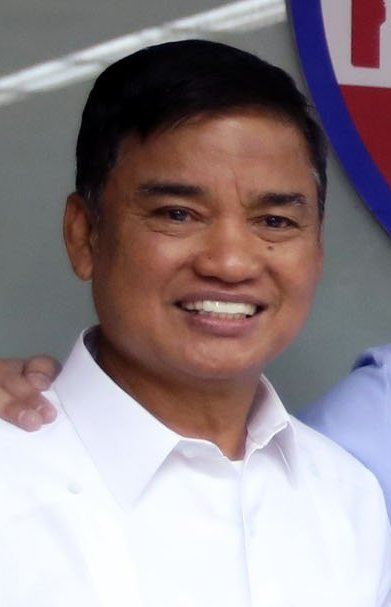

Nominee	Jaime Fresnedi	Aldrin San Pedro	Artemio Simundac
Party	Liberal	UNA	NPC
Running mate	Celso Dioko	Raul Corro	Baby Aguilar
Popular vote	125,456	68,417	20,558
Percentage	53.8%	31.8%	9.5%
Mayor before election
Jaime Fresnedi
Liberal
Elected mayor
Jaime Fresnedi
Liberal

Local elections were held in Muntinlupa on May 9, 2016, within the Philippine general election. The voters elected for the elective local posts in the city: the mayor, vice mayor, the congressman, and the 16 councilors, eight each in the two local legislative districts of Muntinlupa.

== Background ==
Incumbent Jaime Fresnedi is running for a fifth nonconsecutive term as Mayor of Muntinlupa. He was a former city legal officer before elected vice mayor from 1988 until he was elected mayor in 1998. He ran for mayor in 2010; however, he was defeated by then incumbent Aldrin San Pedro. He ran again and won in the 2013 elections. His opponents are former mayor Aldrin San Pedro and incumbent vice mayor Artemio Simundac. San Pedro was a former Sangguniang Kabataan chairman and city councilor in 1995 and was elected vice mayor in 2004. In 2007, he ran and won as Mayor of Muntinlupa defeating Lor Fresnedi, wife of Mayor Jaime Fresnedi. In 2010, he defeated Fresnedi but lost for his third and final term in 2013. Simundac was a former barangay captain of Cupang and ABC president and was elected vice mayor in 2007.

== Candidates ==
=== Congressman ===
Incumbent representative Rodolfo Biazon is not running. His son, former Customs commissioner and former Muntinlupa representative Ruffy Biazon, and former Optical Media Board chairman Ronnie Ricketts faced each other in the congressional election.

2016 Philippine House of Representatives election in Muntinlupa
Party	Candidate	Votes	%
Liberal	Rozzano Rufino "Ruffy" B. Biazon	135,472	60.36%
UNA	Ronald "Ronnie" Ricketts	69,508	30.97%
Invalid or blank votes		19,466	8.67%
Total votes		224,446	100.00%
Liberal hold			

=== Mayor ===
Muntinlupa Mayoralty Election
Party	Candidate	Votes	%
Liberal	Jaime "Jimmy" Fresnedi	125,456	53.8%
UNA	Aldrin San Pedro	68,417	31.8%
NPC	Artemio Simundac	20,558	9.5%
Independent	Reynaldo Abas	553	0.3%
Independent	Oscar Marmeto	318	0.1%
Total votes		215,302	100.00%
Liberal hold			

=== Vice Mayor ===
Muntinlupa Vice Mayoralty Election
Party	Candidate	Votes	%
Liberal	Celso Dioko	102,665	50.4%
UNA	Raul Corro	95,519	46.9%
NPC	Baby Aguilar-Nava	5,576	2.7%
Total votes		203,760	100.00%
Liberal gain from NPC			

=== Councilors ===
Team Fresnedi

Liberal Party/Team Fresnedi Muntinlupa-1st District
Name	Party
Louie Arciaga	Liberal
Patricio Boncayao Jr.	Liberal
Allan Camilon	Liberal
Danny Carandang	Liberal
Bong Cruz	Liberal
Bal Niefes	Liberal
Phanie Teves	Liberal
Ringo Teves	Liberal

Liberal Party/Team Fresnedi Muntinlupa-2nd District
Name	Party
Tintin Abas	Liberal
Ma. Dhesiree Arevalo	Liberal
Lester Baes	Liberal
Lucio Constantino	Liberal
Grace Gonzaga	Liberal
Marissa Rongavilla	Liberal
Rafael “Raffy” Sevilla	Liberal
Victor “Vic” Ulanday	Liberal

Partido San Pedro

United Nationalist Alliance/Partido San Pedro 1st District
Name	Party
Rommel Abanto	UNA
Ivee Arciaga-Tadefa	UNA
Alex Diaz	UNA
Ave Marmeto	UNA
King Marquez	UNA
Allan Paule	UNA
Erick Ramirez	UNA
Pastor Neil Varias	UNA

United Nationalist Alliance/Partido San Pedro 2nd District
Name	Party
Don Bunye	UNA
Anthony De Leon	UNA
Nica Landrito-Escandor	UNA
Manuel "Manolet Ripol" Llige	UNA
Marlon Medina	UNA
Allan Miranda	UNA
Raoul Olbes	UNA
Anna Soriano	UNA

Bagong Muntinlupa

Nationalist People's Coalition/Bagong Muntinlupa 1st District
Name	Party
Edwin Arciaga	NPC
Alex Borja	NPC
Romwell Dumag	NPC
Jones Espeleta	NPC
Naomi Estrada	NPC
Christian Gravador	PDP–Laban
James Solchaga	NPC
Jean Zarceno	NPC

Nationalist People's Coalition/Bagong Muntinlupa 2nd District
Name	Party
Kyra Carlos	NPC
Tags De Lumban	NPC
Elmer Espeleta	NPC
Charley Leongson	NPC
Mai Redor	NPC
Annray Rivera	NPC
Neptali Santiago	NPC
Rusty Unisa	NPC

==== 1st District ====
Muntinlupa City Council Elections - 1st District
Party	Candidate	Votes	%
Liberal	Patricio Boncayao Jr.	76,956	
Liberal	Bal Niefes	75,617	
Liberal	Stephanie Teves	72,993	
Liberal	Allan Camilon	68,243	
Liberal	Ringo Teves	65,201	
Liberal	Louie Arciaga	63,583	
UNA	Alex Diaz	56,394	
UNA	Ivee Arciaga-Tadefa	55,557	
Liberal	Bong Cruz	52,217	
Liberal	Danny Carandang	36,790	
Independent	Johnson San Pedro	35,382	
UNA	Rommel Abanto	35,060	
UNA	Allan Paule De Guzman	33,228	
UNA	King Marquez	30,365	
UNA	Erick Ramirez	30,215	
UNA	Ave Marmeto	22,775	
UNA	Pastor Neil Varias	22,337	
NPC	Alex Borja	14,276	
NPC	Edwin Arciaga	12,708	
NPC	Jones Espeleta	11,671	
NPC	Naomi Estrada	5,862	
NPC	James Solchaga	4,882	
NPC	Jean Zarceno	4,213	
NPC	Romwell Dumag	3,981	
PDP–Laban	Christian Gravador	3,703	
Independent	Ed Molina	3,520	
Independent	Ma. Arlene Paningasan	2,918	
Total votes		900,652	100.00%

==== 2nd District ====
Muntinlupa City Council Elections - 2nd District
Party	Candidate	Votes	%
Liberal	Ma. Dhesiree “Dhes” Arevalo	53,724	
Liberal	Christine “Tintin” Abas	51,281	
Liberal	Marissa Rongavilla	44,035	
Liberal	Lester Baes	40,605	
Liberal	Lucio Constantino	40,093	
Liberal	Rafael “Raffy” Sevilla	38,095	
Liberal	Victor “Vic” Ulanday	35,983	
Liberal	Grace Gonzaga	34,012	
NPC	Neptali Santiago	32,347	
UNA	Nica Landrito-Escandor	23,195	
NPC	Elmer Espeleta	22,205	
UNA	Allan Miranda	21,368	
UNA	Manuel “Manolet Ripol” Llige	17,478	
UNA	Don Bunye	17,451	
UNA	Raoul Olbes	17,384	
UNA	Marlon Medina	14,971	
UNA	Anthony De Leon	14,545	
UNA	Anna Soriano	13,699	
NPC	Kyra Carlos	7,443	
NPC	Annray Rivera	4,776	
NPC	Mai Redor	4,654	
NPC	Rusty Unisa	4,516	
Independent	Amelia Aquino	4,056	
NPC	Charley Leongson	3,378	
NPC	Tags De Lumban	3,244	
Independent	Angelita Policarpio	2,032	
Independent	Maylin Obog	1,737	
Total votes		568,307	100.00%
