= Jaime Fresnedi =

Filipino politician

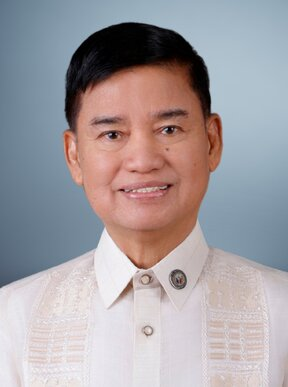
- Official portrait, 2026

Member of the Philippine House of Representatives from Muntinlupa's Lone District
- Incumbent
- Assumed office June 30, 2022
- Preceded by: Ruffy Biazon

16th Mayor of Muntinlupa
- In office June 30, 2013 – June 30, 2022
- Vice Mayor: Artemio Simundac (2013–16, 2019–22); Celso Dioko (2016–19)
- Preceded by: Aldrin San Pedro
- Succeeded by: Ruffy Biazon
- In office March 21, 1998 – June 30, 2007
- Vice Mayor: Vicente Chua (1998–2001); Jojay Alcaraz (2001–04); Aldrin San Pedro (2004–07)
- Preceded by: Ignacio Bunye
- Succeeded by: Aldrin San Pedro

Vice Mayor of Muntinlupa
- In office February 2, 1988 – March 21, 1998
- Mayor: Ignacio Bunye
- Preceded by: Antonio Misa Jr.
- Succeeded by: Vicente Chua
- In office June 13, 1986 – December 1, 1987
- Mayor: Ignacio Bunye
- Succeeded by: Antonio Misa Jr.

Personal details
- Born: Jaime dela Rosa Fresnedi; April 27, 1950 (age 76) Muntinlupa, Rizal, Philippines
- Party: Liberal (2009–present); One Muntinlupa (local party; 2021–present)
- Other political affiliations: Lakas (until 2009)
- Spouse: Loreta Obong
- Children: 1
- Profession: Lawyer
- Website: Official website

Jaime dela Rosa Fresnedi (born April 27, 1950), also known as Jimmy Fresnedi, is a Filipino politician, lawyer, and businessman currently serving as a member of the Philippine House of Representatives representing the lone district of Muntinlupa, Metro Manila, since 2022. He previously served as the mayor of Muntinlupa from 1998 to 2007 and from 2013 to 2022 and as vice mayor of Muntinlupa from 1986 to 1987 and from 1988 to 1998.

== Early and personal life ==
Fresnedi was born on April 27, 1950, in Muntinlupa, which was then a municipality part of Rizal province. He is married to Loreta Obong, with whom he has a son named Joma and a grandson named Neo. They reside in the Villa Carolina subdivision in Tunasan, Muntinlupa.

Fresnedi also owns two Caltex gasoline stations in Muntinlupa.

== Political career ==
Fresnedi entered politics in 1986 when he was appointed officer-in-charge vice mayor of Muntinlupa, then a municipality, following the People Power Revolution that formed a new government under President Corazon Aquino. He served the role alongside lawyer, journalist, and businessman Ignacio Bunye, who was appointed as OIC mayor. In 1988, Fresnedi and Bunye contested the first local election under the new Constitution of the Philippines, with the latter as mayor and the former as vice mayor. The tandem served three terms until 1998, three years after Muntinlupa was formally converted into a highly urbanized city and established its own legislative district in the Philippine House of Representatives for the 1998 election. On March 21, 1998, Bunye resigned as mayor, opting to run for the inaugural position while Fresnedi took his place, which prompted Fresnedi to run for mayor himself; both were successful.

=== Mayor of Muntinlupa (1998–2007, 2013–2022) ===
During his first term as Mayor of Muntinlupa, Fresnedi established the regional offices of the Registry of Deeds (now the Land Registration Authority), the Land Transportation Office, and the National Bureau of Investigation.

Fresnedi won two re-election bids for mayor in 2001 and 2004. Under the Constitution, he was barred from seeking a fourth consecutive term; in 2007, his wife Loreta ran for the mayoral post, but she lost to Vice Mayor Aldrin San Pedro. When Fresnedi was eligible to run again for mayor in 2010, he ran again but also lost to San Pedro, who was in his second term as mayor. In 2013, Fresnedi contested San Pedro again and successfully defeated him by 4,280 votes.

In February 2015, Fresnedi presented a single-step transaction system for registering business licenses in Muntinlupa. He said the innovation aims to improve the city's economic growth and competitiveness in the business and economics sectors. The system was presented at the 2014 World Cities Summit in Singapore.

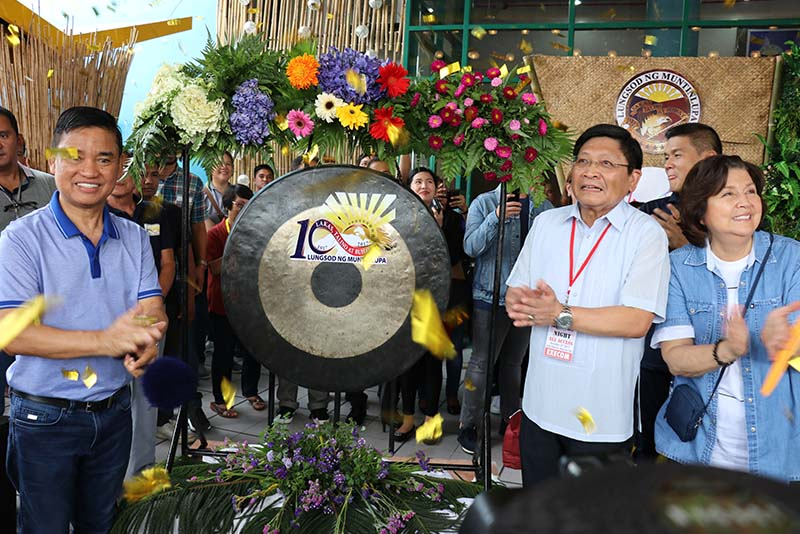
Fresnedi and then-MMDA Chairman Danilo Lim during the opening of the 2017 Metro Manila Film Festival, which coincided with the centennial of the foundation of Muntinlupa as a municipality.

In 2019, the Bureau of Internal Revenue reported that Muntinlupa had the highest local revenue collection in Metro Manila, with ₱5.42 billion collected, ₱2.36 billion of which was corporate tax.

In March 2019, a resident of Putatan filed charges of graft and plunder against Fresnedi before the Ombudsman of the Philippines for allegedly overpricing a lot in the barangay by ₱1,500 per square meter in 2014. Residents also filed charges of administrative raps, gross misconduct, gross negligence, and abuse of power against Fresnedi before the Ombudsman, claiming that he had violated the Government Procurement Act (Republic Act No. 9184) and the Local Government Code (Republic Act No. 7160) by allegedly ratifying the extension of employment contracts that had already expired as "urgent". According to the residents, Fresnedi compelled the Muntinlupa city council to pass a resolution authorizing him to extend the contract of Linde plc and four other entities through lump sum transactions. A councilor denied that the city council issued such a resolution.

In September 2019, Fresnedi initiated a zero-interest loan program for small and medium-sized enterprises in Muntinlupa. The program would provide them with financial assistance ranging from ₱2,000 to ₱150,000, additional capital loan assistance, and entrepreneurial education opportunities. Fresnedi's government partnered with the Technical Education and Skills Development Authority for the program.

During Fresnedi's tenure as mayor of Muntinlupa, the city received the Seal of Good Local Governance from the Department of the Interior and Local Government in 2015 and 2019. The Philippine Chamber of Commerce and Industry also awarded Muntinlupa the "Most Business-Friendly LGU" in 2017 and 2018, and a special citation was given in 2019. His administration earned commendations for its adherence to the Anti–Red Tape Act of 2007, as well as for achievements in areas such as economic competitiveness, disaster risk reduction and resilience, and the delivery of health services.

==== Education ====
Since 2013, Fresnedi's government has been pushing for inclusion in Muntinlupa's scholarship program.

In April 2014, Fresnedi allocated a budget of ₱63 million for the city's scholars for that year, nearly thrice the budget of ₱21.5 million allotted for 2013.

In October 2017, Fresnedi was awarded the "Model Local Chief Executive Award" by the Association of Local Colleges and Universities and the Commission on Higher Education. Councilor Phanie Teves, who chaired the Committee on Education, accepted the award on his behalf.

In 2018, Fresnedi and Muntinlupa Representative Ruffy Biazon initiated a project to construct additional school buildings for the city's public schools.

In 2019, the Philippine Department of Education reported that Muntinlupa had the highest number of scholarship beneficiaries in the country, with over 65,000 scholars. Fresnedi hailed the achievement in his 2019 State of the City address, noting the increase from 5,581 scholars when he was re-elected in 2013.

In February 2020, Fresnedi signed an ordinance increasing the allowance of the city's scholars by ₱1,000, with an additional ₱2,500 if scholars obtain a graded weighted average of at least 1.76. Scholars from state colleges and universities may also receive a maximum incentive of ₱10,000 per semester.

==== Emergency response ====
In 2017, Fresnedi's government mandated the construction of a new fire station in Tunasan, which the Bureau of Fire Protection recognized as the "Best Fire Station" in 2018.

In September 2018, Fresnedi led the donation of eight ambulance units worth ₱12.8 million to nine barangays in the city.

In March 2019, Fresnedi led the donation of ten fire trucks worth ₱52.3 million to nine barangays in the city.

=== House of Representatives (2022–present) ===
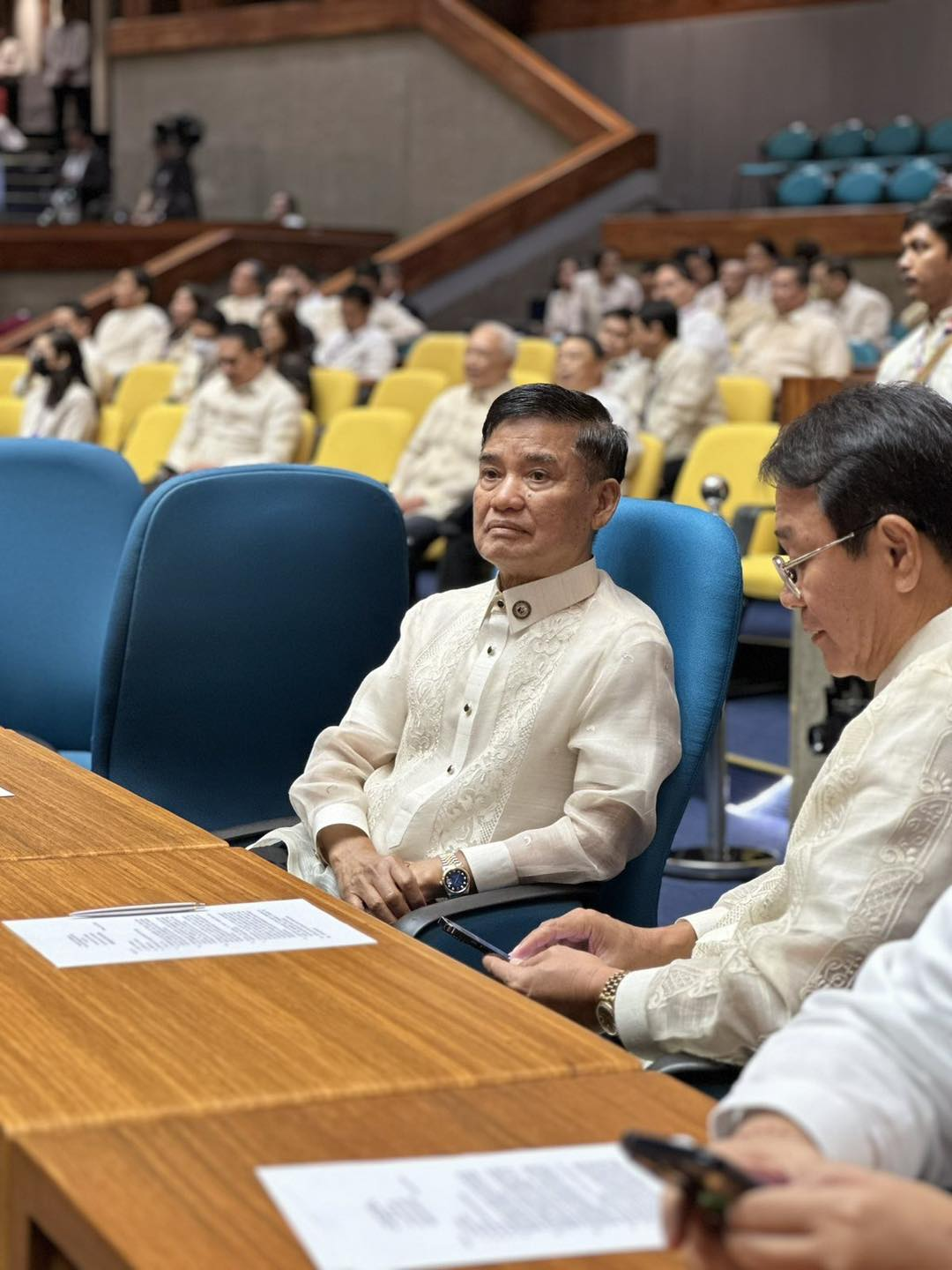
Fresnedi during the opening session of the 19th Congress second regular session, July 2023.

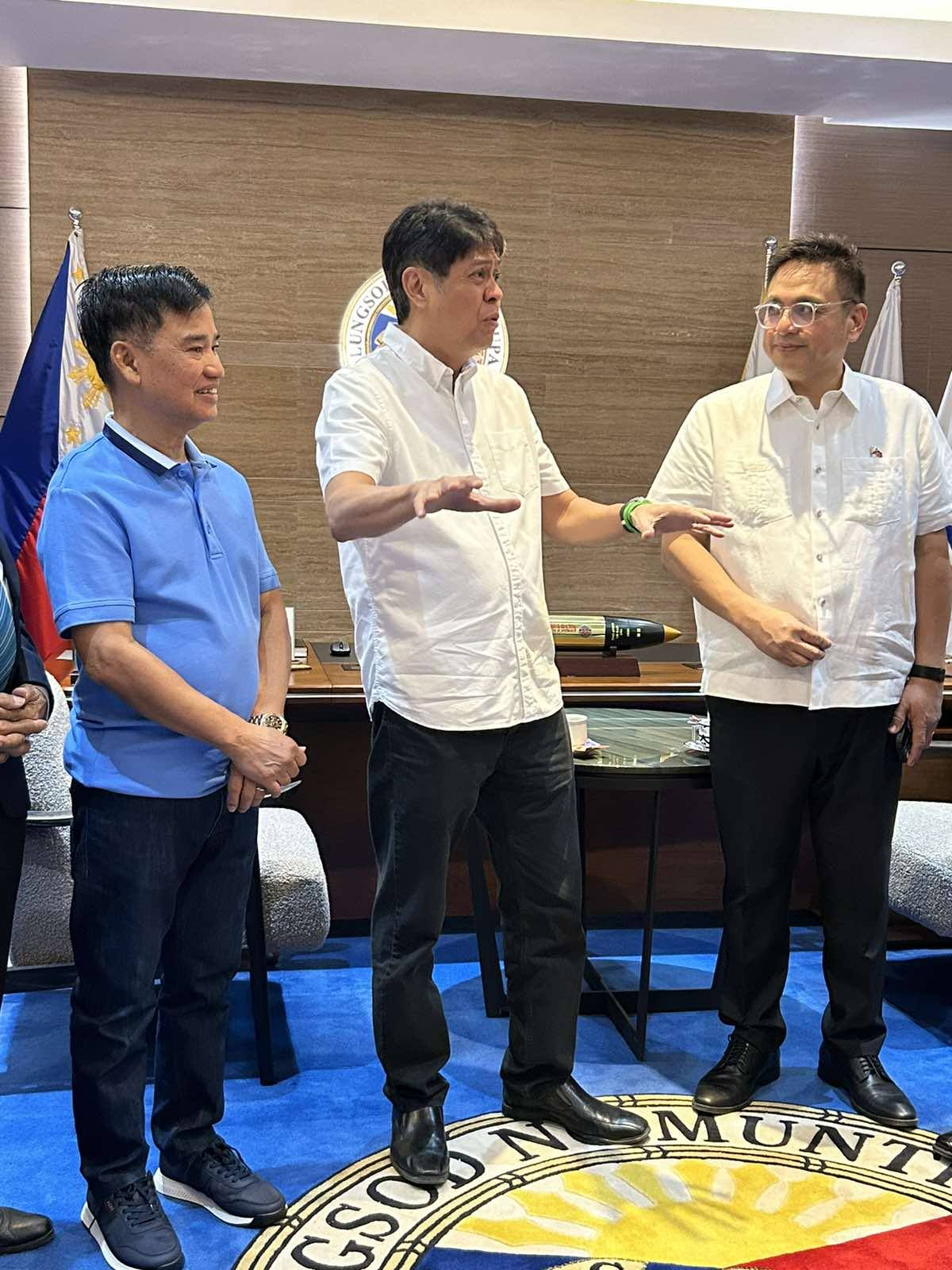
Fresnedi with former Senator Kiko Pangilinan (center) and Mayor Ruffy Biazon (right) at the Muntinlupa City Hall, March 2025.

Fresnedi, being term-limited as mayor, ran for representative of the lone congressional district of Muntinlupa in 2022 under the Liberal Party and the One Muntinlupa local party. He switched places with incumbent representative Ruffy Biazon, who was One Muntinlupa's standard bearer for mayor. He won the race, defeating Silverio Garing of PDP–Laban in a landslide. Fresnedi was sworn in as representative on June 30, 2022.

During the 19th Congress (2022–2025), Fresnedi was a member of the majority bloc. He participated in the following House committees:

- Committee on Appropriations
- Committee on Basic Education and Culture
- Committee on Government Enterprises and Privatization
- Committee on Human Rights
- Committee on Justice
- Committee on Local Government
- Committee on Public Works and Highways

In the first two years of his first term in Congress, Fresnedi authored or co-authored 22 laws, including Republic Act No. 11934 (the SIM Registration Act) and Republic Act No. 11953, which provides for the condonation of unpaid interests, penalties, and surcharges on land reform loans. By the start of the Third Regular Session, he had been the principal author or co-author of over 250 bills and resolutions, addressing a wide range of issues aimed at promoting both national economic development and the welfare of ordinary Filipinos. His legislative work is underscored by a perfect attendance record in House sessions.

As a member of the Committee on Basic Education and Culture, he filed House Bill No. 63, which seeks to provide free meals for kindergarten pupils; House Bill No. 64, aiming to enhance teacher compensation; and House Bill No. 65, which proposes a national education roadmap.

On public health, he has advocated for legislation to improve access to medical services for marginalized groups. This includes House Bill No. 9686, proposing a Disability Support Fund; House Bill No. 9691, which expands PhilHealth coverage to include mental health services; and House Bill No. 10352, which establishes a vision care program for underprivileged children.

Drawing from his experience as a former mayor, Fresnedi also champions stronger local governance. He authored House Bill No. 3436, which introduced reforms in real property valuation to enhance local government revenue generation. The bill was enacted into law as Republic Act No. 12001.

Fresnedi has also prioritized senior citizen welfare, filing House Bill No. 9687 to provide free dialysis treatments and House Bill No. 7052 to protect elderly individuals from fraud. The latter bill passed on the third reading during the second regular session.

In line with improving the justice system, he filed House Bill No. 56 to increase the number of Regional Trial Court branches in Muntinlupa, recognizing the role of judicial efficiency in maintaining public order and supporting economic activity.

In April 2024, Fresnedi filed House Bill No. 10162, also known as the "National Integrated Obesity Management" bill, which seeks to establish a comprehensive national program to address obesity in the Philippines. Citing 2022 data from the Department of Science and Technology's Food and Nutrition Research Institute (DOST–FNRI) indicating that approximately 27 million Filipinos are overweight, Fresnedi emphasized the growing strain obesity places on the country's healthcare system due to its association with conditions such as diabetes and cardiovascular diseases.

The proposed measure outlines the creation of the National Integrated Obesity Management Program, which would serve as the central framework for all government-led anti-obesity initiatives. Its objectives include reducing mortality and health impacts related to adult and childhood obesity, lowering the prevalence of preventable obesity, and improving access to relevant healthcare services such as counseling and nutrition support. The bill also proposes the establishment of a National Integrated Obesity Management Council under the Department of Health (DOH), which would function as the primary body responsible for policymaking, planning, and coordinating national obesity management efforts.

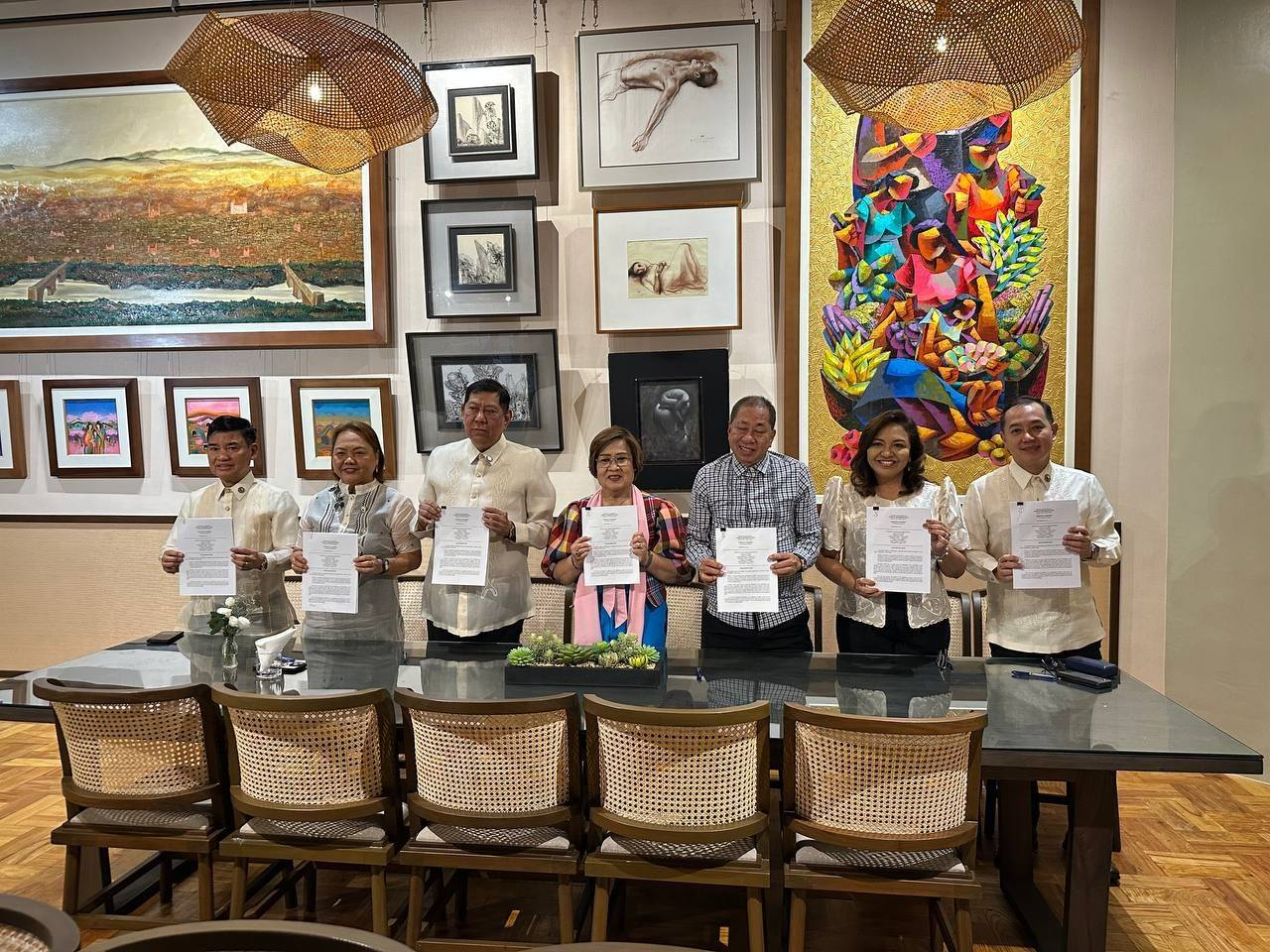
Fresnedi (left) with fellow representatives from the Liberal Party presenting the House Bill No. 2897 (People’s Freedom of Information Act of 2025) that they have filed during the 20th Congress

In October 2024, Fresnedi filed House Bill No. 10897 seeking to amend Republic Act No. 11900, also known as the Vaporized Nicotine and Non-Nicotine Products Regulation Act, by reinstating child protection provisions that were removed during the law's passage in 2022. A key provision of the bill is the proposal to raise the minimum legal age for the purchase and use of vape products from 18 to 21 years old. The measure has received support from advocacy groups, including the Child Rights Network, which described the proposal as a step toward responsible regulation that places children's health and safety above commercial interests.

In addition to age restrictions, HB 10897 proposes transferring regulatory authority over vapes, heated tobacco products, and similar items from the Department of Trade and Industry (DTI) to the Food and Drug Administration (FDA). The bill's explanatory note argues that because these products pose significant health risks, their oversight should be under a health agency with the scientific capacity to implement appropriate public health safeguards.

Beyond policymaking, Fresnedi's congressional office has facilitated access to government assistance for nearly 30,000 residents of Muntinlupa, helping provide medical, educational, livelihood, and financial support to those in need.

On October 5, 2024, Fresnedi filed his certificate of candidacy for a second term as Muntinlupa congressman. He ran under the Liberal Party and the One Muntinlupa local party again. On May 12, 2025, Fresnedi won a second term as Muntinlupa's lone district representative, defeating PDP's Silverio Garing once more.

=== Electoral history ===
==== 2025 ====
2025 Philippine House of Representatives election in Muntinlupa
| Party | Candidate | Votes | % |
|---|---|---|---|
| Liberal | Jaime Fresnedi | 177,504 | 75.79% |
| PDP | Silverio Garing | 56,710 | 24.21% |
| Total votes | | 234,214 | 100.00% |
| Liberal hold | | | |

==== 2022 ====
2022 Philippine House of Representatives election in Muntinlupa
| Party | Candidate | Votes | % |
|---|---|---|---|
| Liberal | Jaime Fresnedi | 183,085 | 77.71% |
| PDP–Laban | Silverio Garing | 52,530 | 22.29% |
| Total votes | | 235,615 | 100.00% |
| Liberal gain from PDP–Laban | | | |

==== 2019 ====
2019 Muntinlupa mayoralty election
| Party | Candidate | Votes | % |
|---|---|---|---|
| Liberal | Jaime Fresnedi (incumbent) | 164,114 | 75.37% |
| NUP | Red Mariñas | 52,127 | 23.93% |
| WPP | Baby Aguilar-Nava | 1,065 | 0.48% |
| PDDS | Rudy Arcay Victa | 442 | 0.20% |
| Total votes | | 217,778 | 100.00% |
| Liberal hold | | | |

==== 2016 ====
2016 Muntinlupa mayoralty election
| Party | Candidate | Votes | % |
|---|---|---|---|
| Liberal | Jaime Fresnedi (incumbent) | 125,456 | 53.8% |
| UNA | Aldrin San Pedro | 68,417 | 31.8% |
| NPC | Artemio Simundac | 20,558 | 9.5% |
| Independent | Reynaldo Abas | 553 | 0.3% |
| Independent | Oscar Marmeto | 318 | 0.1% |
| Total votes | | 215,302 | 100.00% |
| Liberal hold | | | |

==== 2013 ====
2013 Muntinlupa mayoralty election
| Party | Candidate | Votes | % |
|---|---|---|---|
| Liberal | Jaime Fresnedi | 73,797 | 51.4% |
| UNA | Aldrin San Pedro (incumbent) | 69,798 | 48.6% |
| Total votes | | 143,595 | 100.00% |
| Liberal gain from UNA | | | |

==== 2010 ====
2010 Muntinlupa mayoralty election
| Party | Candidate | Votes | % |
|---|---|---|---|
| Lakas–Kampi | Aldrin San Pedro (incumbent) | 108,091 | 58.5% |
| Liberal | Jaime Fresnedi | 76,808 | 41.5% |
| Total votes | | 184,899 | 100.00% |
| Lakas–Kampi hold | | | |

==== 2004 ====
2004 Muntinlupa mayoralty election
| Party | Candidate | Votes | % |
|---|---|---|---|
| Lakas–Kampi | Jaime Fresnedi (incumbent) | 82,184 | 57.2% |
| KNP | Elizabeth Masangkay | 61,280 | 42.7% |
| Total votes | | 143,464 | 100.00% |
| Lakas–Kampi hold | | | |

== See also ==
- List of mayors of Metro Manila

House of Representatives of the Philippines
| Preceded by Ruffy Biazon | Member of the House of Representatives from Muntinlupa's at-large district 2022–present | Incumbent |
Political offices
| Preceded by Ignacio Bunye | Mayor of Muntinlupa; 1998–2007 | Succeeded by Aldrin San Pedro |
| Preceded by Aldrin San Pedro | Mayor of Muntinlupa; 2013–2022 | Succeeded by Ruffy Biazon |
