= Biazon =

Biazon is a surname. Notable people with the surname include:

- Rodolfo Biazon (1935–2023), Filipino politician
- Ruffy Biazon (born 1969), Filipino politician
