= Ignacio Bunye =

Filipino Lawyer and Politician (born 1945)

The Honorable Ignacio R. Bunye
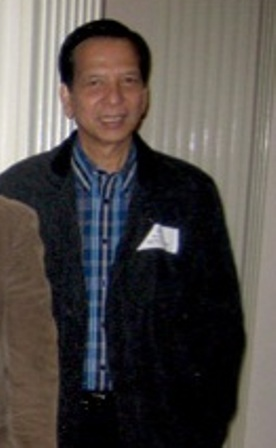
- Bunye in 2008

Member of the Monetary Board of the Bangko Sentral ng Pilipinas
- In office July 3, 2008 – July 2, 2014
- Preceded by: Vicente B. Valdepeñas, Jr.
- Succeeded by: Juan de Zuniga

Executive Secretary
- Acting
- In office October 21 – October 30, 2007
- President: Gloria Macapagal Arroyo

Presidential Spokesperson
- In office 2003–2008
- Preceded by: Rigoberto Tiglao
- Succeeded by: Eduardo Ermita

Philippine Press Secretary
- In office July 16, 2002 – January 19, 2003
- President: Gloria Macapagal Arroyo

Member of the House of Representatives of the Philippines from Muntinlupa
- In office June 30, 1998 – June 30, 2001
- Preceded by: Seat established
- Succeeded by: Ruffy Biazon

Chairman of the Metropolitan Manila Authority
- In office June 30, 1991 – June 30, 1992
- President: Corazon Aquino
- Preceded by: Jejomar Binay
- Succeeded by: Mel Mathay

15th Mayor of Muntinlupa
- In office February 2, 1988 – March 21, 1998
- Vice Mayor: Jaime Fresnedi
- Preceded by: Victor Aguinaldo
- Succeeded by: Jaime Fresnedi
- In office June 13, 1986 – December 1, 1987
- Vice Mayor: Jaime Fresnedi
- Preceded by: Santiago Carlos, Jr.
- Succeeded by: Victor Aguinaldo

Personal details
- Born: April 19, 1945 (age 81) Quiapo, Manila, Commonwealth of the Philippines
- Party: Lakas (from 1991)
- Spouse: Dr. Miraflor T. Oca (m. 1968; died 2023)
- Children: 3
- Education: Ateneo de Manila University (BA, LL.B); Asian Institute of Management (MBM)
- Occupation: Journalist, reporter, politician
- Profession: Lawyer

Ignacio Rivera Bunye (born April 19, 1945) is a Filipino public official who retired in 2014 as a Monetary Board Member of the Bangko Sentral ng Pilipinas, a post he held since July 3, 2008. Prior to his appointment as a monetary board member, he served as the Press Secretary, acting Executive Secretary under Gloria Macapagal Arroyo, Congressman, and Mayor of Muntinlupa. He recently rejoined the Bank of the Philippine Islands as Independent Director.

== Early life ==
Ignacio R. Bunye was born April 19, 1945, to Dr. Alfredo M. Bunye, Sr. and Sofia V. Rivera, a pre-war movie actress with the screen name Gloria Imperial whose younger sister Mila del Sol was also a movie darling of her time.

He took his early education at Itaas Elementary School and his secondary education at Muntinlupa National High School, where he graduated valedictorian. He took up a Bachelor of Arts at Ateneo de Manila University and graduated in 1964 and Bachelor of Law in 1969. He also holds a Masters in Management degree from the Asian Institute of Management.

He worked at the Filipinas Foundation Inc. as Assistant Corporate Secretary from 1970 to 1975, Assistant Vice President of BPI Investment Corporation from 1976 to 1983 and Assistant Vice President for Corporate Banking and Treasury at the Bank of the Philippine Islands from 1983 to 1985.

Atty. Ignacio R. Bunye was a working student. He was a news reporter for the Philippine Daily Star from 1967 to 1969, for the DZMT News from 1965 to 1967 and a war correspondent in South Vietnam. As a DZMT reporter, he covered the Vietnam War and wrote a documentary entitled "The Other War," a first-person account of the activities of the Philippine Civic Action Group in Tay Ninh, South Vietnam. At the Daily Star, he wrote a number of articles, including a four-part series entitled "War Vignettes," a first-person account of events immediately after the Tet Offensive in South Vietnam in 1968.

He has been inducted as a member of the Manila Overseas Press Club. He is also a lifetime member of the National Press Club.

As well as being a lawyer by profession, Bunye has served in various executive positions at the Ayala Group of Companies, including as Assistant Vice President of the Ayala Investment and Development Corporation and the Bank of the Philippine Islands.

== Mayor of Muntinlupa ==
When Corazon Aquino assumed presidency after the People Power Revolution in 1986, Bunye was designated Officer-in-Charge (OIC) of the then-municipality of Muntinlupa.

He was elected as Mayor of Muntinlupa from 1988 to 1998. As mayor, Bunye also served in a concurrent capacity as Chairman of the then Metropolitan Manila Authority from 1991 to 1992. The Metropolitan Manila Authority is the forerunner of the Metropolitan Manila Development Authority.

In 1995, Bunye was again reelected as Mayor of Muntinlupa for his last three-year term. During his 12-year stewardship, Muntinlupa metamorphosed from a fifth-class municipality into a highly urbanized city. Adopting proven corporate practices that he gained from working in the private sector, Bunye initiated the computeratization of Muntinlupa, streamlined operations and cut red tape, thus making Muntinlupa the business-friendly community that it is today. During his watch, Muntinlupa was consistently ranked by the Department of Finance as number one in Metro Manila in terms of realty tax collection efficiency.

He founded the Muntinlupa Polytechnic College, the city’s public college, which has since been converted into the Pamantasan ng Lungsod ng Muntinlupa. He upgraded the public health centers and also established the city cemetery for Muntinlupa's poor.

Toward the end of his term as Mayor, Bunye laid the foundation for the establishment of the Ospital ng Muntinlupa through the acquisition of a five-hectare lot within Filinvest Corporate City, which is also the site of the future Civic Center Complex.

== House of Representatives ==
Barred by law from seeking a fourth consecutive term as Mayor, Bunye ran for Congress in 1998 and became the first Congressman from the newly created lone district of Muntinlupa.

In Congress, Bunye continued to champion the cause of local governments, especially in providing them with greater fiscal autonomy.

Originally a member of the minority, Bunye was one of the fiscalizers of the 11th Congress. With the change of leadership toward the end of the 11th Congress, he became the Senior Deputy Majority Floor Leader of House Speaker Feliciano Belmonte, Jr.

== Cabinet Member ==
Bunye had served as Press Secretary from July 16, 2002, to January 19, 2003, before he formally assumed the post of Presidential Spokesperson on January 20, 2003.

On August 24, 2004, he was again appointed as Press Secretary this time concurrently as Spokesperson. He was designated as Acting Executive Secretary from October 21–30, 2007, during which time he signed the papers pardoning former President Joseph Estrada. He also briefly held the position of Presidential Adviser on Political Affairs before assuming his position at the Monetary Board.

Bunye writes weekly columns for the Manila Bulletin, Tempo, People's Tonight, Sun Star, BusinessWeek Mindanao and Filipino Reporter. He authored a book entitled "Central Banking For Every Juan and Maria". He is a recipient of the Asian Institute of Management Honor and Prestige Award, Bangko Sentral Service Excellence Medal, Gran Orden de Isabela Catolica, and Order of Lakandula (Rank of Bayani).

== Personal life ==
Bunye was married to Miraflor T. Oca, a pediatrician. She died on June 24, 2023. They have three children.

House of Representatives of the Philippines
New district	Representative, Lone District of Muntinlupa; 1998 – 2001	Succeeded by Ruffy Biazon
Political offices
Preceded by Santiago Carlos, Jr.	Mayor of Muntinlupa; 1986 – 1998	Succeeded by Jaime Fresnedi
Preceded by Jejomar Binay	Chairman of the Metropolitan Manila Authority; 1991 – 1992	Succeeded by Ismael Mathay Jr.
Preceded by Silvestre Afable, Jr.	Philippine Press Secretary; 2002 – 2003	Succeeded by Hernani Braganza
Preceded by Milton Alingod	Philippine Press Secretary; 2004 – 2008	Succeeded by Jesus Dureza
Preceded by Rigoberto Tiglao	Presidential Spokesperson; 2003 – 2008	Succeeded by Eduardo Ermita
Preceded by Vicente B. Valdepeñas, Jr.	Monetary Board Member; 2008 – 2014	Succeeded by Juan de Zuniga
