= 2019 Muntinlupa local elections =

Philippine election

2019 Muntinlupa mayoral election
← 2016	May 13, 2019	2022 →
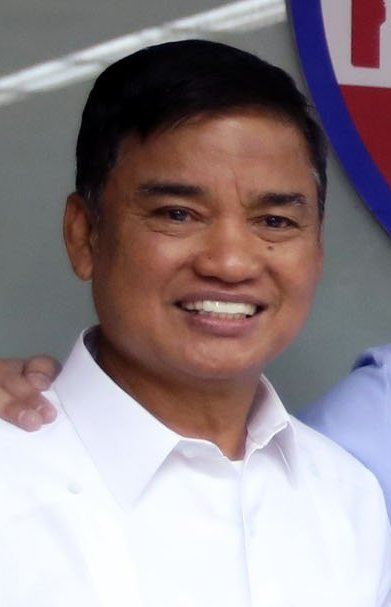

Nominee	Jaime Fresnedi	Red Mariñas
Party	Liberal	NUP
Running mate	Artemio Simundac	Celso Dioko
Popular vote	164,114	52,127
Percentage	75.37%	23.93%
Mayor before election
Jaime Fresnedi
Liberal
Elected mayor
Jaime Fresnedi
Liberal

Local elections were held in Muntinlupa on May 13, 2019 within the 2019 Philippine general election. Voters elected for the elective local posts in the city: the mayor, vice mayor, the congressman, and the 16 councilors, eight each in the two local legislative districts of Muntinlupa.

== Candidates ==
=== District Representative ===
2019 Philippine House of Representatives election in Muntinlupa
Party	Candidate	Votes	%
PDP–Laban	Ruffy Biazon	169,756	81.45%
UNA	Paeng Arciaga	36,317	17.42%
PDDS	Rodolfo Llorca	2,326	1.11%
Total votes		208,399	100.00%
PDP–Laban hold			

=== Mayor ===
Muntinlupa Mayoralty Election
Party	Candidate	Votes	%
Liberal	Jaime Fresnedi	164,114	75.37%
NUP	Red Mariñas	52,127	23.93%
WPP	Baby Aguilar-Nava	1,065	0.48%
PDDS	Rudy Arcay Victa	442	0.20%
Total votes		217,778	100.00%
Liberal hold			

=== Vice Mayor ===
Muntinlupa Vice Mayoralty Election
Party	Candidate	Votes	%
PDP–Laban	Artemio Simundac	116,825	56.22%
NUP	Celso Dioko	85,889	41.33%
Independent	Rafael Burgos	3,277	1.57%
WPP	Timmy Richard Gabriel	1,799	0.86%
Total votes		207,790	100.00%
PDP–Laban gain from NUP			

=== Councilor ===
Team Fresnedi

Liberal Party/PDP–Laban/Team Fresnedi Muntinlupa-1st District
Name	Party
Louie Arciaga	Liberal
Paty Katy Boncayao	Liberal
Allan Camilon	Liberal
Raul Corro	PDP–Laban
Alexson Diaz	Liberal
Nicanor Echavez	Liberal
Ting Niefes	Liberal
Melchor Teves	PDP–Laban

Liberal Party/PDP–Laban/Team Fresnedi Muntinlupa-2nd District
Name	Party
Lester Baes	PDP–Laban
Ryan Bagatsing	PDP–Laban
Arlene Hilapo	Liberal
Eliot Martinez	PDP–Laban
Dado Moldez	Liberal
Marissa Rongavilla	PDP–Laban
Nep Santiago	PDP–Laban
Jun “Metong” Sevilla	Liberal

Team Red Mariñas

National Unity Party/Team Red Mariñas Muntinlupa-1st District
Name	Party
Ivee Arciaga-Tadefa	NUP
Ning Calalang	NUP
Caloy Casaldon	NUP
Jay Dolleton	NUP
Mai Maligaya-Mangudadatu	NUP
King Marquez	NUP
Joshua Sebastian	NUP
Stephanie Teves	NUP

National Unity Party/Team Red Mariñas Muntinlupa-2nd District
Name	Party
Ma. Dhesiree Arevalo	NUP
Luvi Constantino	NUP
Nica Escandor	NUP
Grace Gonzaga	NUP
Allan Miranda	NUP
Ariel Nofuente	NUP
Nilo Santos	NUP
Vic Ulanday	NUP

==== 1st District ====
Muntinlupa City Council Elections - 1st District
Party	Candidate	Votes	%
PDP–Laban	Raul Corro	97,183	
Liberal	Alexson Diaz	91,643	
Liberal	Paty Katy Boncayao	90,098	
Liberal	Louie Arciaga	80,886	
Liberal	Allan Camilon	78,854	
Liberal	Ting Niefes	68,715	
NUP	Phanie Teves	68,349	
NUP	Ivee Arciaga-Tadefa	63,240	
Liberal	Nicanor Echavez	58,325	
PDP–Laban	Melchor Teves	57,555	
NUP	Ning Calalang	39,823	
NUP	Mai Maligaya-Mangudadatu	37,087	
NUP	King Marquez	27,225	
NUP	Jay Dolleton	24,194	
Independent	Danny Carandang	15,305	
NUP	Joshua Sebastian	14,265	
NUP	Caloy Casaldon	12,569	
Independent	Ryan de la Cruz	6,587	
WPP	Evelyn Sanchez	3,896	
PDDS	Jojo Regala	3,613	
Independent	Tristan Dimatulac	3,231	
WPP	Sonnyboy Nava	2,205	
PDDS	Churchill de Lara	2,165	
WPP	Timrich Gabriel	1,537	
Total votes		948,550	100.00%

==== 2nd District ====
Muntinlupa City Council Elections - 2nd District
Party	Candidate	Votes	%
PDP–Laban	Nep Santiago	51,784	
PDP–Laban	Marissa Rongavilla	48,541	
PDP–Laban	Ryan Bagatsing	47,069	
PDP–Laban	Lester Baes	44,119	
NUP	Ma. Dhesiree Arevalo	43,063	
Liberal	Jun “Metong” Sevilla	42,337	
Liberal	Arlene Hilapo	39,931	
PDP–Laban	Eliot Martinez	38,048	
NUP	Luvi Constantino	37,220	
Liberal	Dado Moldez	37,209	
NUP	Nica Escandor	26,015	
NUP	Grace Gonzaga	25,835	
NUP	Vic Ulanday	23,091	
NUP	Allan Miranda	21,121	
NUP	Ariel Nofuente	15,162	
NUP	Nilo Santos	11,944	
PFP	Gonza Vasquez	6,018	
Independent	Willie Emeterio	2,595	
PDDS	Kenneth Macaylas	1,918	
Total votes		563,020	100.00%
