= Ruffy Biazon =

Filipino politician

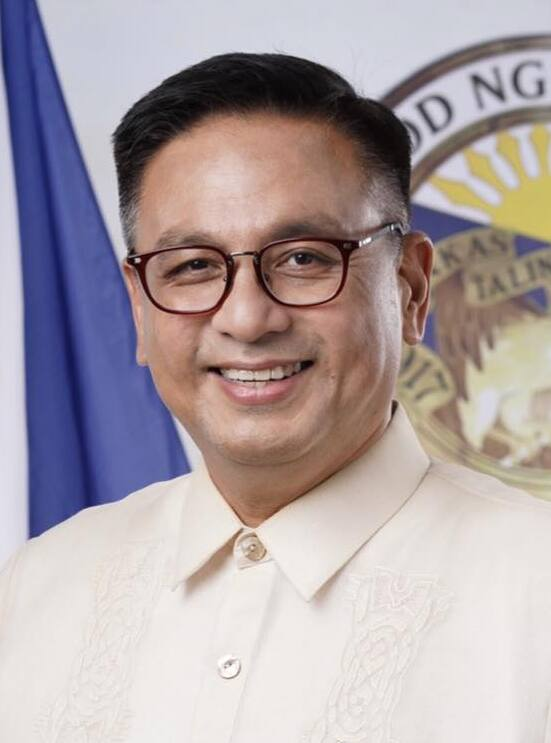
- Official portrait, 2022

18th Mayor of Muntinlupa
- Incumbent
- Assumed office June 30, 2022
- Vice Mayor: Artemio Simundac (2022–2025); Phanie Teves (2025–present)
- Preceded by: Jaime Fresnedi

Member of the House of Representatives from Muntinlupa
- In office June 30, 2016 – June 30, 2022
- Preceded by: Rodolfo Biazon
- Succeeded by: Jaime Fresnedi
- In office June 30, 2001 – June 30, 2010
- Preceded by: Ignacio Bunye
- Succeeded by: Rodolfo Biazon

Commissioner of the Bureau of Customs
- In office September 16, 2011 – December 6, 2013
- President: Benigno Aquino III
- Preceded by: Angelito Alvarez
- Succeeded by: Sunny Sevilla

Director of the Videogram Regulatory Board
- In office 1991–1992

Personal details
- Born: Rozzano Rufino Bunoan Biazon; March 20, 1969 (age 57) Cavite City, Cavite, Philippines
- Party: One Muntinlupa (2021–present)
- Other political affiliations: PDP–Laban (2016–2021); Liberal (2004–2016); LDP (1992–2004)
- Spouse: Catherine Mary Reyes (m. 1990)
- Parent: Rodolfo Biazon (father)
- Education: University of Santo Tomas (BS)
- Occupation: Politician
- Website: Official website

Rozzano Rufino "Ruffy" Bunoan Biazon (born March 20, 1969) is a Filipino politician serving as the 18th mayor of Muntinlupa since 2022. He previously represented Muntinlupa's at-large district in the Philippine House of Representatives from 2001 to 2010 and from 2016 to 2022. He has also served as Commissioner of Bureau of Customs from 2011 to 2013. From 1991 to 1992, he also served as a board member of the Videogram Regulatory Board. He is the son of former senator Rodolfo Biazon.

In Congress, Biazon served as chairman of the Committee on Metro Manila Development, vice chairman of the Committee on National Defense and Security, vice chairman of the Committee on Information and Communications Technology, vice chairman of the Committee on Appropriations, and a member of the Congressional Oversight Committee on the Visiting Forces Agreement. He was the principal author of eight Republic Acts, which include the National Disaster Risk Reduction and Management Act and the Philippine Coast Guard Act, and co-author of 36 others.

== Early life ==
Christened Rozzano Rufino Bunoan Biazon was born on March 20, 1969, at a military hospital at the Cavite Naval Station in Cavite City, the third and youngest child of then Lt. Rodolfo Gaspar Biazon and Monserrat (née Bunoan) Biazon. Ruffy grew up in a military camp. He spent his childhood in Navy Village in Fort Bonifacio where they stayed in government housing for military officers.

For his basic education, Biazon attended at Malate Catholic School.

== Career ==
=== Videogram Regulatory Board (1991–1992) ===
Biazon began his public life right after college when he was appointed by then-president Corazon Aquino as the youth representative of the Videogram Regulatory Board. He was 22 years old.

=== Senate staff (1992–2001) ===
When his father, a newly retired Armed Forces Chief of Staff, was elected senator in 1992, he was taken in as Senator Rodolfo Biazon's chief of staff.

In 1995, his father did not win his re-election bid due to allegations against him regarding the "Dagdag-Bawas" scam. However, the younger Biazon was acquired by newly-elected senator Sergio Osmeña III as Chief Legislative Officer. When his father once again ran in 1998 and won, Biazon returned as chief of staff in his father's office.

Biazon directed and managed his father's campaign three times and served in the Senate for a total of seven years. He then ran for a seat in the House of Representatives.

=== House of Representatives (2001–2010) ===
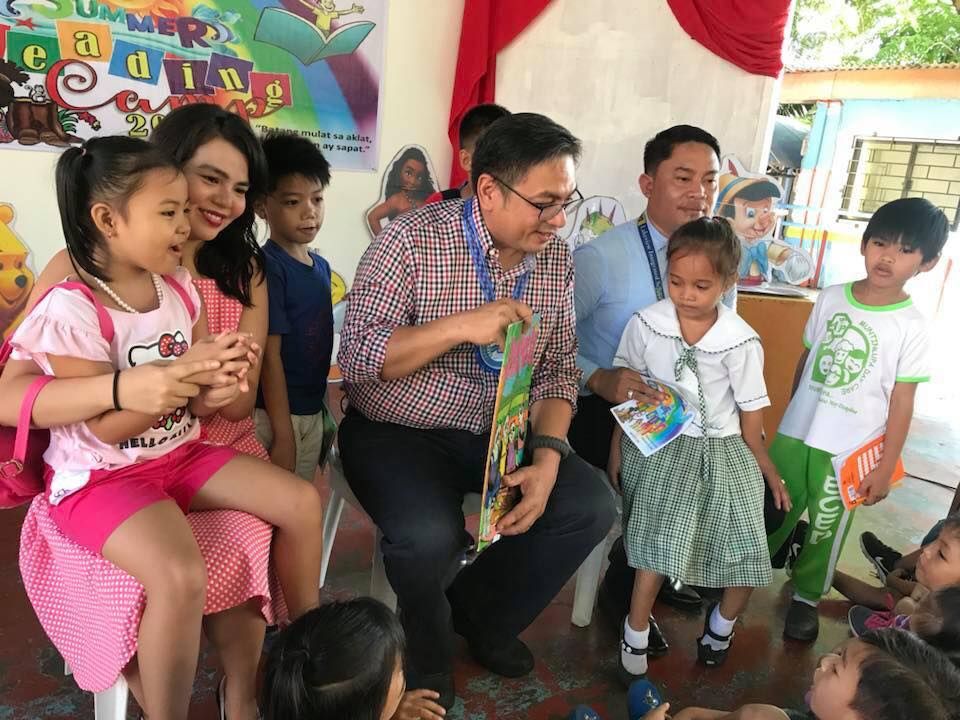
Biazon (center) reading to schoolchildren in Putatan, Muntinlupa, in 2018. Councilor Phanie Teves (left) joins him.

In 2001, Biazon sought the seat of Muntinlupa's at-large congressional district in the House of Representatives, which was then held by Ignacio Bunye, a former three-term mayor of that city. Although bearing the name of his senator-father, he was considered an underdog, since then-congressman Bunye had a clean slate as a public official and an undefeated record as a politician. Biazon was a newcomer and upstart in Muntinlupa politics, never holding any public office in the city.

Managing his own campaign, Biazon won in his first bid for public office, beating the incumbent by 1,500 votes. This victory was recognized in political circles as one of the most significant upsets in the 2001 elections.

During his tenure, Biazon adopted a program of government that he termed as "6K", which stood for "Karunungan, Kalusugan, Kaunlaran, Kapayapaan, Kabuhayan, Kalikasan" (lit. 'Intelligence, Health, Development, Peace, Livelihoods, Environment'). He was able to secure reelection in 2004. His third and final election as the Representative of the Lone District of Muntinlupa was competitive. For his third term, Biazon was challenged by veteran broadcaster-journalist Ricardo "Dong" Puno, who not only was a very well-known public figure but whose brother had also headed the Department of Interior and Local Government, which meant that he had control over barangays and the Philippine National Police. Biazon was elected for a third consecutive term in 2007.

As a representative, Biazon sponsored and defended the budgets of the Department of Defense in the last two years, the Department of Agrarian Reform and the Metro Manila Development Authority in the previous year, which were all highly controversial due to issues concerning the agencies and invited the interest of dozens of legislators.

He supported the modernization of Muntinlupa's public school system by introducing the Computer Training for Educators and Resources for Students Program (Compu.T.E.R.S. Program), which included computer literacy training for teachers, provision of computer hardware for schools, the use of educational software, the creation of computer labs, and connection to the internet.

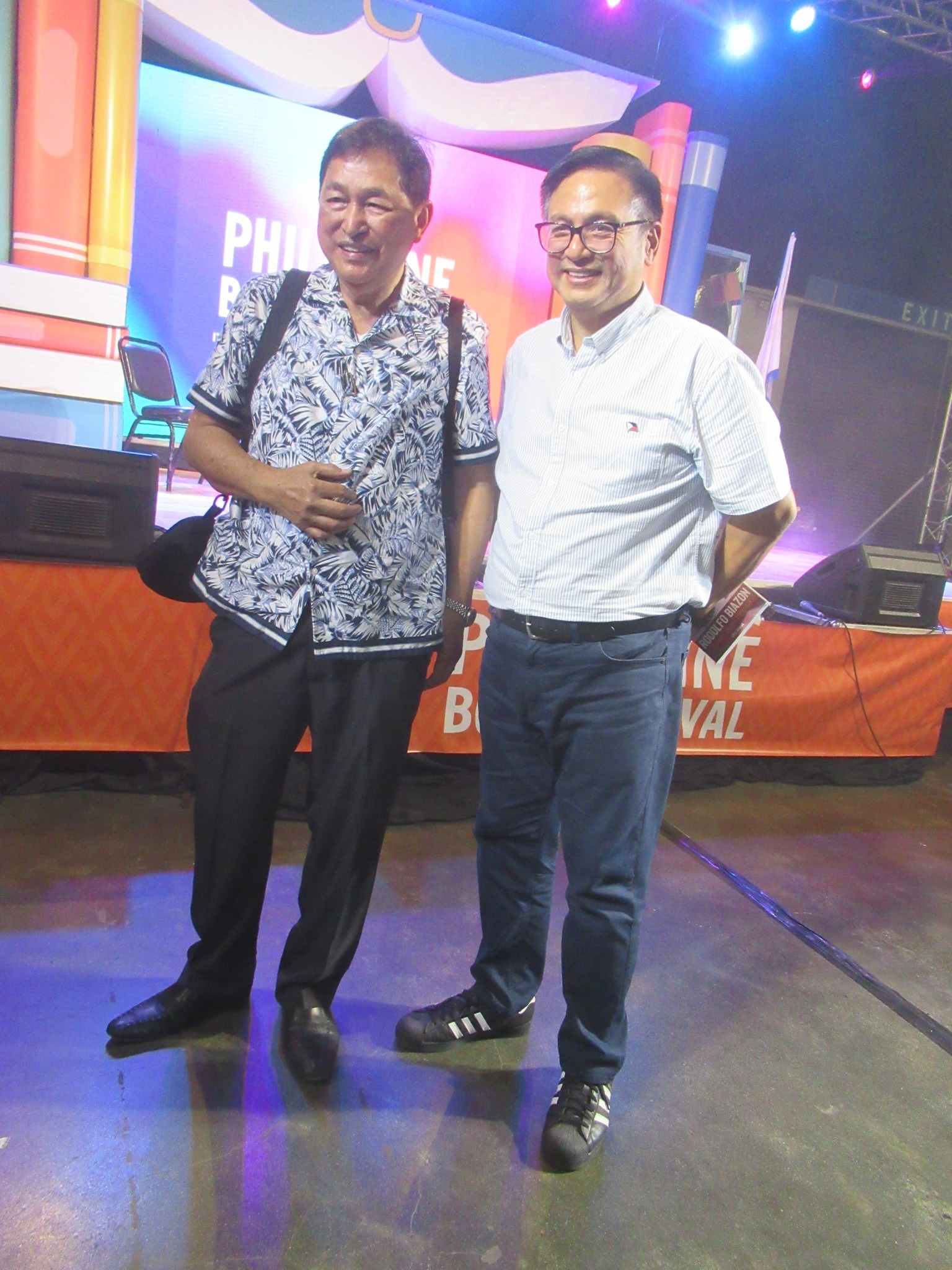
Ruffy Biazon and Adolfo Azcuna

=== 2010 senatorial bid ===
Being term-limited as a congressman, Biazon ran for senator in 2010 under the Liberal Party ticket. His father was also term-limited as senator and had decided to run for congressman of Muntinlupa. He lost, placing 14th, while his father was successful, succeeding him.

=== Bureau of Customs (2011–2013) ===
On September 14, 2011, Biazon was appointed by President Benigno S. Aquino III as Commissioner of the Bureau of Customs after then-commissioner Angelito Alvarez formally resigned. Two days later he formally accepted the position and assumed his position as commissioner on September 16, 2011. In BuCor, Biazon supported anti-corruption reforms and compliance with international standards on customs administration. On December 2, 2013, Biazon resigned from his position.

=== House of Representatives (2016–2022) ===
As his father decided not to seek reelection, Biazon decided to run for a return to Congress in 2016. Allied with Mayor Jaime Fresnedi, he was successful that year, defeating Ronnie Ricketts. He was then reelected for a second consecutive term in 2019.

=== Mayor of Muntinlupa (2022–present) ===
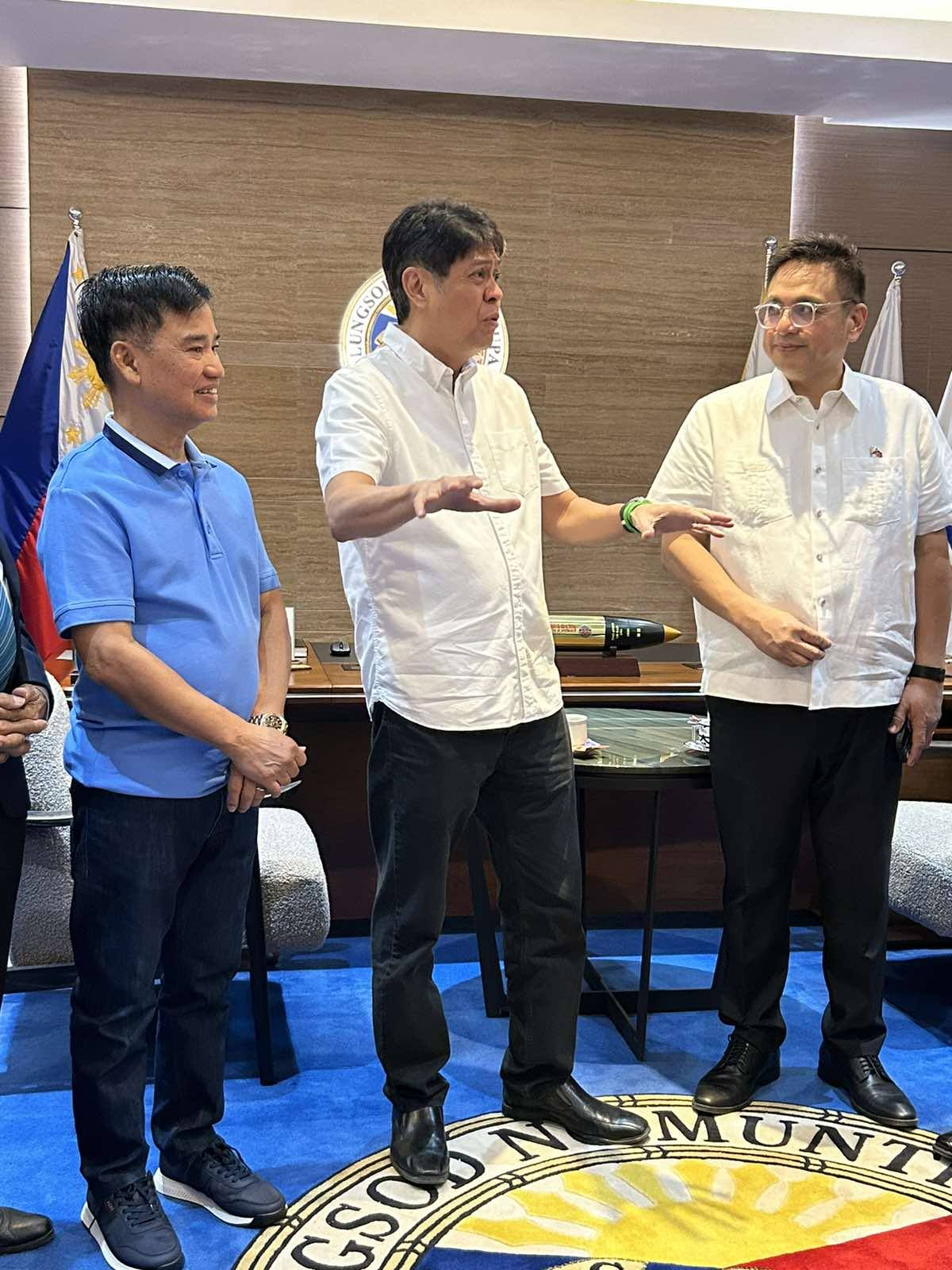
Biazon (right) with Congressman Jaime Fresnedi (left) and former Senator Kiko Pangilinan (center) at the Muntinlupa City Hall in 2025.

Biazon ran for Mayor of Muntinlupa in 2022 to succeed term-limited incumbent mayor Jaime Fresnedi, with incumbent vice mayor Artemio Simundac as his running mate. He ran under One Muntinlupa, a newly-launched local party. He won the mayoralty race.

Biazon ran for re-election unopposed and was proclaimed the winner on May 13, 2025. On May 30, Biazon was convicted by the Sandiganbayan of graft in a case of the PDAF scam involving ₱1.95 million in public funds when he was a congressman and was sentenced to up to 10 years' imprisonment.

On November 21, 2025, Biazon was appointed chairperson of the Regional Peace and Order Council-National Capital Region (RPOC-NCR).

== Electoral history ==
Electoral history of Ruffy Biazon
Year	Office	Party	Votes received				Result
Year	Office	Party	Total	%	P.	Swing	Result
2001	Representative (Muntinlupa)	LDP	51,435		1st	—N/a	Won
2004	Representative (Muntinlupa)	Liberal	93,261	59.1	1st	—N/a	Won
2007	Representative (Muntinlupa)	Liberal			1st	—N/a	Won
2010	Senator of the Philippines	Liberal	8,626,514	22.61	14th	—N/a	Lost
2016	Representative (Muntinlupa)	Liberal	135,472	60.36	1st	—N/a	Won
2019	Representative (Muntinlupa)	PDP–Laban	169,756	81.45	1st	+21.09	Won
2022	Mayor of Muntinlupa	1MUNTI	180,742	74.26	1st	—N/a	Won
2025	Mayor of Muntinlupa	1MUNTI	209,498	100.00	1st	+25.74	Unopposed

== Personal life ==
Biazon married Catherine Mary "Trina" Reyes, the incumbent head of the Muntinlupa Gender and Development (GAD) Office, in 1990 and has four sons.

In 1993, Biazon joined the Victory Christian Fellowship and served as a children's church worker. He saw it as an opportunity to "improve his skills as a father and strengthen his personal relationship not only with his sons but with God."

Biazon is a certified Rescue Diver.

== See also ==
- List of mayors in Metro Manila

Government offices
Preceded by Angelito Alvarez	Commissioner of the Bureau of Customs; 2011-2013	Succeeded by John Phillip Sevilla
Political offices
Preceded by Jaime Fresnedi	Mayor of Muntinlupa; 2022–present	Incumbent
House of Representatives of the Philippines
Preceded by Ignacio Bunye	Representative, Muntinlupa; 2001–2010	Succeeded by Rodolfo Biazon
Preceded by Rodolfo Biazon	Representative, Muntinlupa; 2016–2022	Succeeded by Jaime Fresnedi
