= Ayala Alabang =

Barangay in Muntinlupa City, Metro Manila, Philippines

Ayala Alabang New Alabang Village
- Barangay
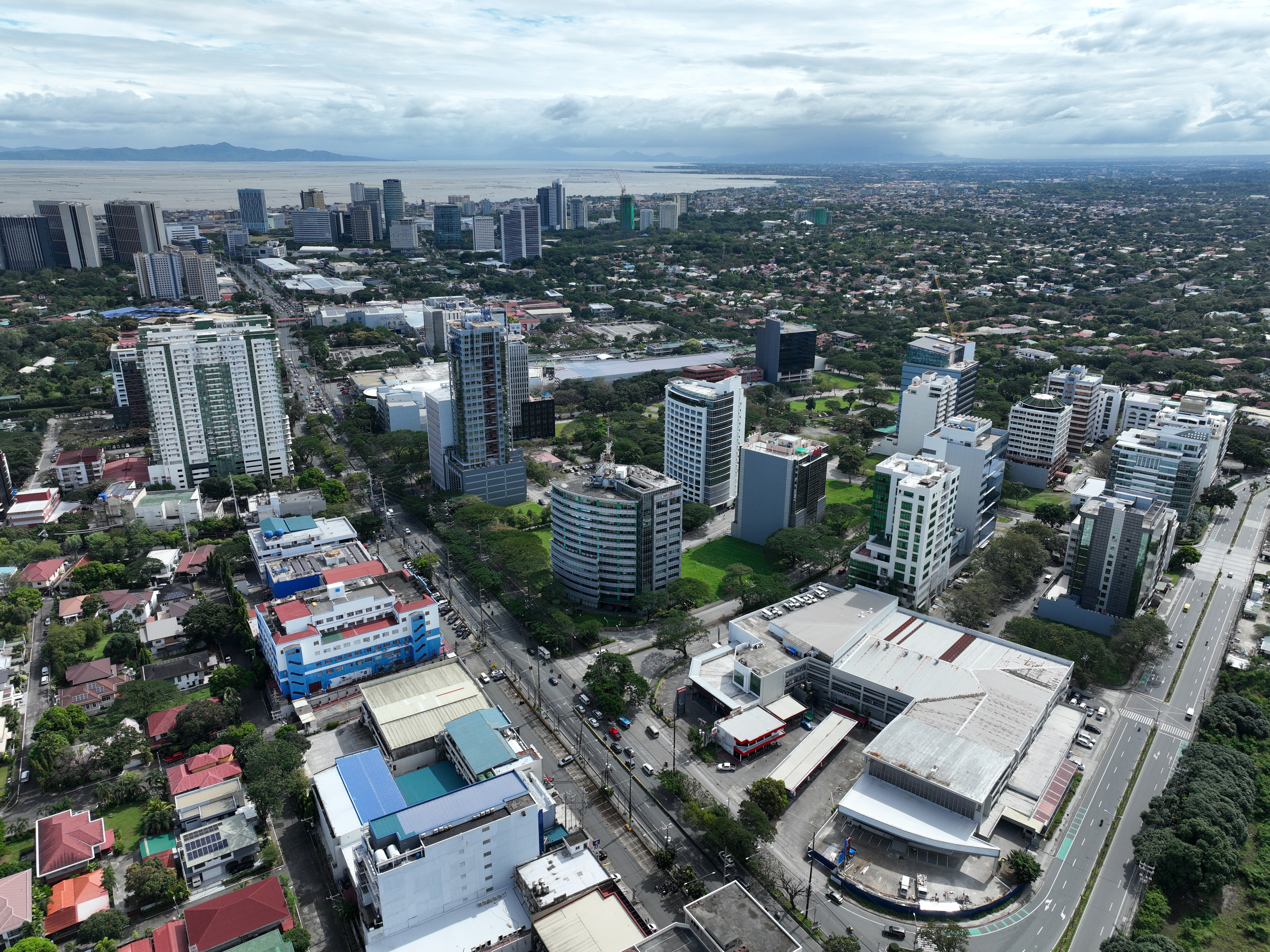
- Aerial view of the Madrigal Business Park

- Seal
- Interactive map of Ayala Alabang
- Coordinates: 14°24′21.5″N 121°1′20.36″E
- Country: Philippines
- Region: Metro Manila
- City: Muntinlupa
- Congressional district: 2nd district of Muntinlupa
- Established: March 25, 1982

Government
  - Barangay Captain: Marcus Lester Suntay

Area
  - Total: 6.949 km^{2} (2.683 sq mi)

Population (2020)
  - Total: 25,115
  - Density: 3,614/km^{2} (9,361/sq mi)
- ZIP code: 1779; 1780 (Ayala Alabang Village)

Ayala Alabang, in terms of land area, is the third largest barangay in Muntinlupa, Metro Manila, Philippines. A large portion of it came from Barangay Alabang. Its land area of 6.949 km^{2} (2.683 sq mi) includes Alabang Town Center, Ayala Alabang Village, El Molito, Madrigal Business Park, and Alabang Country Club. Barangay Ayala Alabang is located around 21 kilometres (13 mi) south of the capital Manila.

== History ==
Barangay Ayala Alabang was created by Batas Pambansa Bilang 219 on March 25, 1982, initially named as Barangay New Alabang Village. It was originally a part of Barangay Alabang prior to the separation.

In compliance of Section 3 of Batas Pambansa Bilang 219, which provides that "the first barangay officials shall be appointed by the President of the Philippines and shall hold office until their successors shall have been elected or appointed and qualified", then-President Ferdinand E. Marcos appointed Enrique Zóbel de Ayala as the first Barangay Chairman, with Gumersindo Leuterio, Benito Araneta, Edgardo Gatchalián, Mario Torcuator, Jaime Matiás, and Íñigo Zóbel as the first seven Kagawad (councilors). The first elected Barangay Chairman was Vicente Chua who was inducted in 1989, along with the elected Kagawads Oscar Antiquera, Alfred Xerez-Burgos Jr., Francisco Umali, Wilma Pálafox, Rolando Pineda, and Ramón Fernández.

The name was changed to Barangay Ayala Alabang in November 2003, after a public hearing conducted by the Muntinlupa City Government for this purpose, although New Alabang Village is still used as the barangay's alternative name. It was officially renamed by Republic Act No. 12281 in 2025, pending approval by a plebiscite.

=== Religion ===
The Saint James the Great Parish Church, Vicariate of Our Lady of Abandoned, is located at Cuenca corner Ibaan Streets, Ayala Alabang Village, Ayala Alabang. The baroque-style Spanish Colonial-era edifice was constructed in 1991 and finished in 1993. Its interior has a golden retablo with arched ceiling of square patterns towards the altar which has blue lighting. Its long aisle is lined with simple wooden pews and geometrically-designed tiles. The statues of the Virgin Mary and Jesus guard the church entrance. The Protestant-related Christ's Commission Fellowship has a congregation located in Ayala Alabang, known as CCF Alabang and host worship and fellowship services.

== Demographics ==
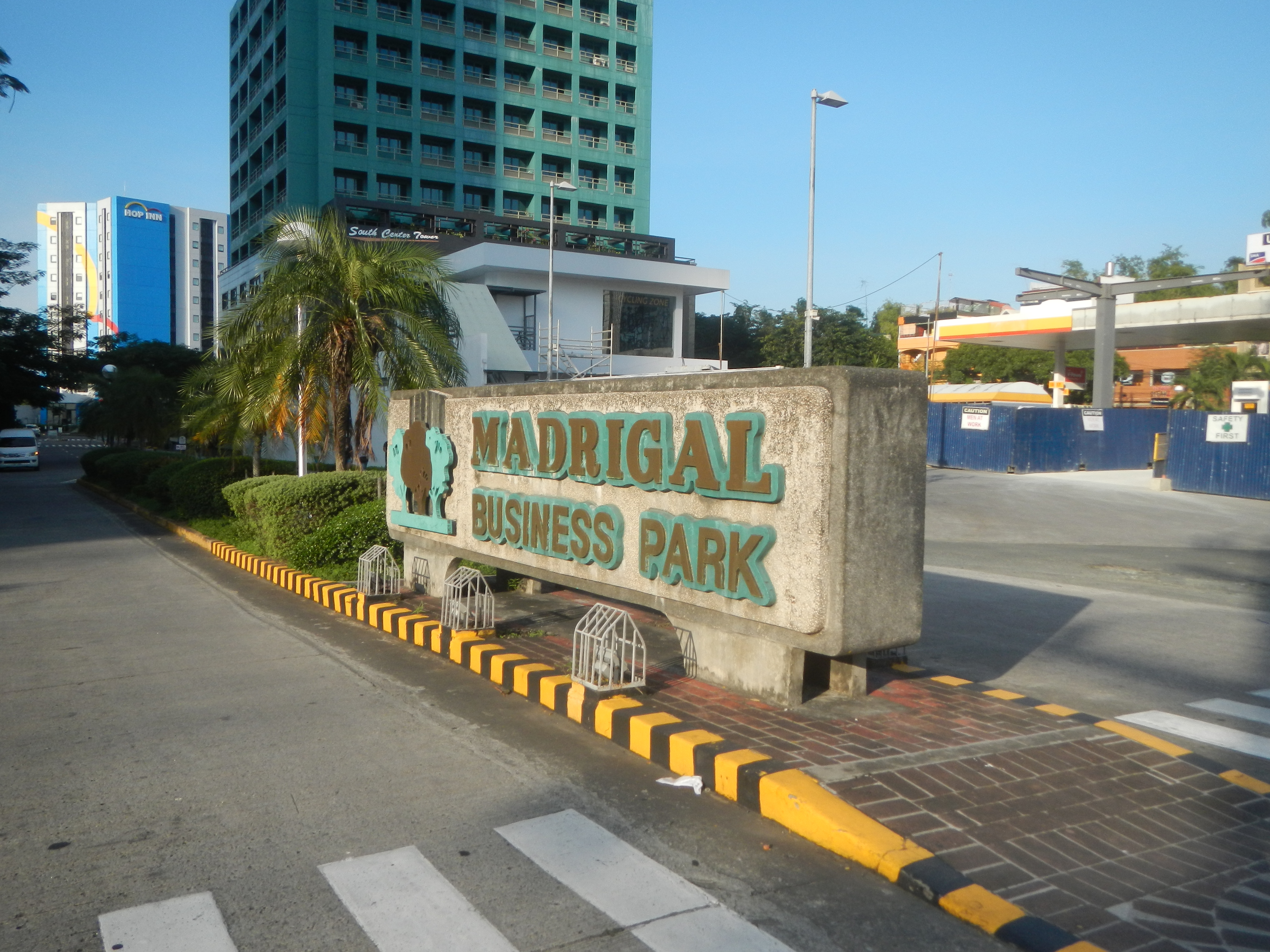
Madrigal Business Park is the major business area in the barangay

Year	Population
2007	20,226
2010	20,349
2015	21,429
2020	25,115
2024	22,850

== Government ==
Like all of the barangays in the Philippines, Ayala Alabang is headed by elected officials, the topmost being the Punong Barangay or the Barangay Chairperson (addressed as Kapitan; also known as the Barangay Captain). The Kapitan is aided by the Sangguniang Barangay (Barangay Council) whose members, called Barangay Kagawad ("Councilors"), are also elected.

Don Enrique Zobel, the first Barangay Chairman, was appointed in 1981. Danilo Tolentino served from 1984 to 1987 and Mr. Anthony Abaya served from 1987 to 1989. Mr. Vicente Chua became the first elected barangay chairman in 1989, assuming together with Kagawads Oscar Antiquera (later a barangay chairman), Alfred Xerez-Burgos Jr., Ramon Fernandez, Wilma Palafox, Rolando Pineda, and Francisco Umali. He was elected President of the Association of Barangay Council of Muntinlupa, and a sectoral representative in the then Sangguniang Bayan of Muntinlupa, representing the Barangay sector from 1989 to 1997. Chua resigned in 1998.

=== Barangay Officials ===
Position	Name
Punong Barangay	Dr. Marcus Lester Suntay
Barangay Kagawads	Dodie Matanguihan
Barangay Kagawads	Archie Lacson
Barangay Kagawads	Ricky Presa
Barangay Kagawads	Dr. Carlo Gomez
Barangay Kagawads	Atty. Philip Yeung
Barangay Kagawads	Pat Bocobo
Barangay Kagawads	Jun Juban

=== Sangguniang Kabataan Officials ===
Position	Name
SK Chairperson	Ianna Malabanan
SK Kagawads	Cedy Belo
SK Kagawads	Tamila Penson
SK Kagawads	Joaquin Fernandez
SK Kagawads	Eddrick Costes
SK Kagawads	Dundee Espina
SK Kagawads	Marina Ibarracin
SK Kagawads	Ruth Refuerzo

== Education ==
The Department of Education (DepEd) is responsible for basic education in the Philippines. The Commission on Higher Education (CHED) is responsible for Higher Education in the Philippines.

Schools located in the barangay are as follows:

- De La Salle Zobel School
- Institute for Child Development
- Maria Montessori Foundation
- PAREF Woodrose School
- San Beda College Alabang
- The Learning Child School
- Virgin Mary Immaculate School
- PAREF Rosemont School

== See also ==
- Muntinlupa
- Alabang
- De La Salle Santiago Zobel School
