= Putatan, Muntinlupa =

Barangay in Muntinlupa City, Metro Manila, Philippines

Putatan
- Barangay
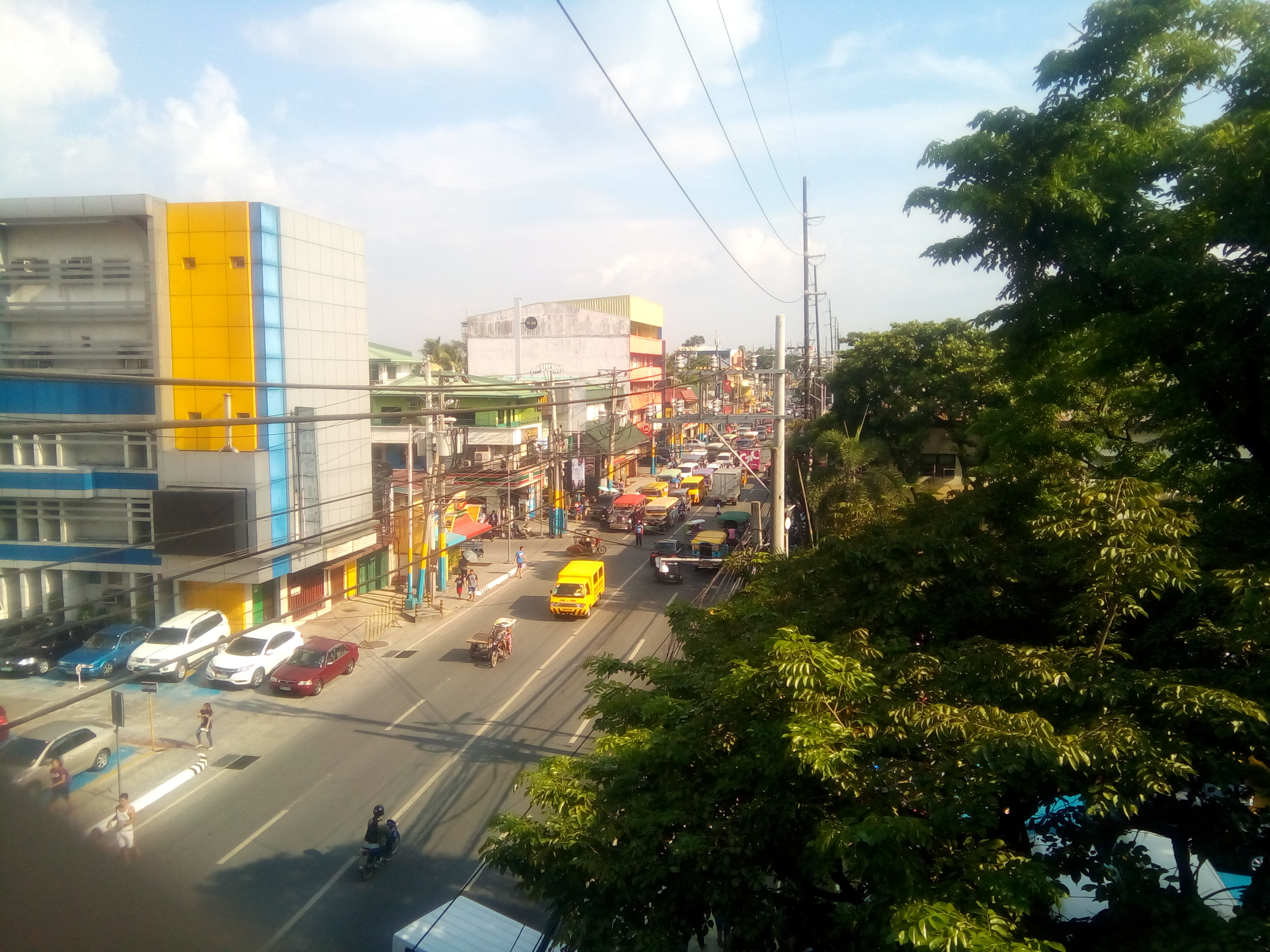
- Manila South Road at the vicinity of Medical Center Muntinlupa
- Coordinates: 14°23′54.12″N 121°2′10.96″E
- Country: Philippines
- Region: National Capital Region
- City: Muntinlupa
- District: 1st Legislative district of Muntinlupa

Government
  - Type: Barangay
  - Barangay Captain: Gerardo Teves
  - SK Chairperson: Cyrylle Kate Arciaga

Area
  - Total: 6.746 km^{2} (2.605 sq mi)

Population (2020)
  - Total: 99,725
  - Density: 14,780/km^{2} (38,290/sq mi)
- Time zone: UTC+8 (PST)
- Postal code: 1772
- Range: Marikina Valley Fault Ridge

Putatan is a barangay in Muntinlupa, Metro Manila, Philippines. The total land area of the barangay is 6.746 km^{2} (2.605 sq mi). According to the 2020 census, it has a population of 102,146 as of 2024.

Putatan is located at the south of the City of Manila. It is bounded by barangays Alabang and Bayanan on the north, Laguna de Bay on the east, the Muntinlupa Poblacion on the south; and barangay Ayala Alabang on the west.

The barangay is also home to the city hall of Muntinlupa and its several departments.

== Etymology ==
Putatan got its name from the tree called putat (Barringtonia asiatica), which grew in the area. Hence, Putatan means “where putat blooms”. It was also alternatively or erroneously spelled as Pututan.

== Demographics ==
Year	Population
2007	88,073
2010	82,015
2015	89,022
2020	99,725
2024	102,146

== Government ==
Like all of the barangays in the Philippines, Putatan is headed by elected officials, the topmost being the Punong Barangay or the Barangay Chairperson (addressed as Kapitan; also known as the Barangay Captain). The Kapitan is aided by the Sangguniang Barangay (Barangay Council) whose members, called Barangay Kagawad ("Councilors"), are also elected.

=== List of Punong Barangay ===
#	Punong Barangay	Term began	Term ended
1	Domingo Tagle	1941	1950
2	Gavino Arciaga	1950	1954
3	Fermin Arciaga	1960	1960
4	Hilario Concepcion	1961	1962
5	Faustino C. Arciaga, Sr.	1962	1972
6	Catalino Bernardino Arciaga	1972	1981
7	Melchor Dela Cruz	1981	1986
8	Alfredo Arciaga	1986	1986
9	Roman Esporlas Niefes	1986	
10	Rufino Ibe		1989
11	Danilo Rosca Teves	1989	1997
12	Col. Pablo Estole Salamat (Ret.)	1997	2002
13	Danilo Rosca Teves	2002	2007
14	Elizabeth Aguilar-Masangkay	2007	2013
15	Danilo R. Teves	2013	2023
16	Gerry Teves	2023	Present

== Subdivisions ==
While barangays are the administrative divisions of the city, and are legally part of the addresses of establishments and homes, residents also include their subdivision. Listed below are subdivisions in this barangay.

- Agro Homes Subdivision
- Bayfair Subdivision
- Bruger Subdivision
- Camella Townhomes 1
- Camella Townhomes 2
- Camella Homes 1
- Camella Homes 2
- Camella Homes 2-D
- Camella Homes 2-E
- Country Homes Alabang Subdivision
- Express View Subdivision
- Freedom Hills
- Freewill Subdivision
- God's Will Homes
- Gruenville Subdivision
- Jayson Ville
- Joasmerray Subdivision
- La Charina Homes
- Lakeview Homes 1
- Lakeview Homes 2
- Multiland/Midland Subdivision
- Mutual Homes Phase 1 & 2
- Mutual Homes Phase 3
- Neuwrain Subdivision
- PUPA Homes
- RCE Homes
- Doña Segundina Townhomes
- SMB Hills
- Soldiers Hills Subdivision
- South Greenheights Subdivision
- South Superville Subdivision
- Summitville Subdivision
- Treelane Subdivision
- V.M. Townhomes
- Hillsview Homes

== Education ==
The Department of Education (DepEd) is responsible for basic education in the Philippines. The Commission on Higher Education (CHED) is responsible for Higher Education in the Philippines.

Schools located in the barangay are as follows:

- Catherine McAuley Learning Center
- Child's Mind Learning Center
- Christ Baptist Academy
- Christ the King School of Muntinlupa
- Christ the Living Intercessor Christian School
- Our lady of Guadalupe Academy (Formerly, Colegio dela Nuestra señora de guadalupe)
- Francisco De Mesa Elementary School
- Holy Infant Academy (Putatan Branch)
- J.B. Kiddies Learning Center
- Lakeview Integrated School
- Lakewood School of Alabang
- Living Light Academy
- Mary Cause of our Joy Catholic School
- Muntinlupa Cosmopolitan School
- Muntinlupa Institute of Technology (MIT)
- Putatan Elementary School
- SEAM Christian Learning Center, Inc.
- South Crest School
- South Mansfield College
- Soldier's Hills Elementary School
