= Legislative districts of Muntinlupa =

Legislative district of the Philippines

The legislative districts of Muntinlupa represent the highly urbanized city of Muntinlupa in the Congress of the Philippines. The city is currently represented in the lower house of Congress through its lone congressional district.

== History ==
Muntinlupa was initially represented as part of the at-large district of the province of Manila in the Malolos Congress from 1898 to 1899. The then-town was later incorporated into the province of Rizal, established in 1901, and was represented as part of the first district of Rizal from 1907 to 1941 (including its time as part of Taguig until 1918) and from 1945 to 1972. During World War II, it was represented as part of the at-large district of Rizal in the National Assembly of the Second Philippine Republic from 1943 to 1944. Muntinlupa was separated from Rizal on November 7, 1975, through Presidential Decree No. 824, and was represented in the Interim Batasang Pambansa along with other Metropolitan Manila municipalities and cities as part of Region IV from 1978 to 1984.

From 1984 to 1986, Muntinlupa was grouped with Pateros and Taguig (as the Legislative district of Taguig–Pateros–Muntinlupa) for representation in the Regular Batasang Pambansa. In 1987, it was grouped with Las Piñas to form the Legislative district of Las Piñas–Muntinlupa. Muntinlupa first elected its own representative in 1998, after its city charter (Republic Act No. 7926) was approved on March 1, 1995 and ratified on May 8, 1995.

== Lone District ==
Liberal Party (1)

Legislative Districts and Congressional Representatives of Muntinlupa City
District	Current Representative	Barangays	Population (2020)
Lone	Jaime R. Fresnedi (since 2022); Tunasan	List: Alabang; Ayala Alabang; Bayanan; Buli; Cupang; Poblacion; Putatan; Sucat; Tunasan	543,445
