= List of Bongbong Marcos 2022 presidential campaign endorsements =

This is a list of notable individuals and organizations who endorsed the campaign of Bongbong Marcos for President of the Philippines and Sara Duterte for Vice President of the Philippines (unless denoted otherwise) in the 2022 Philippine presidential election.

== Political endorsements ==
=== Presidents ===
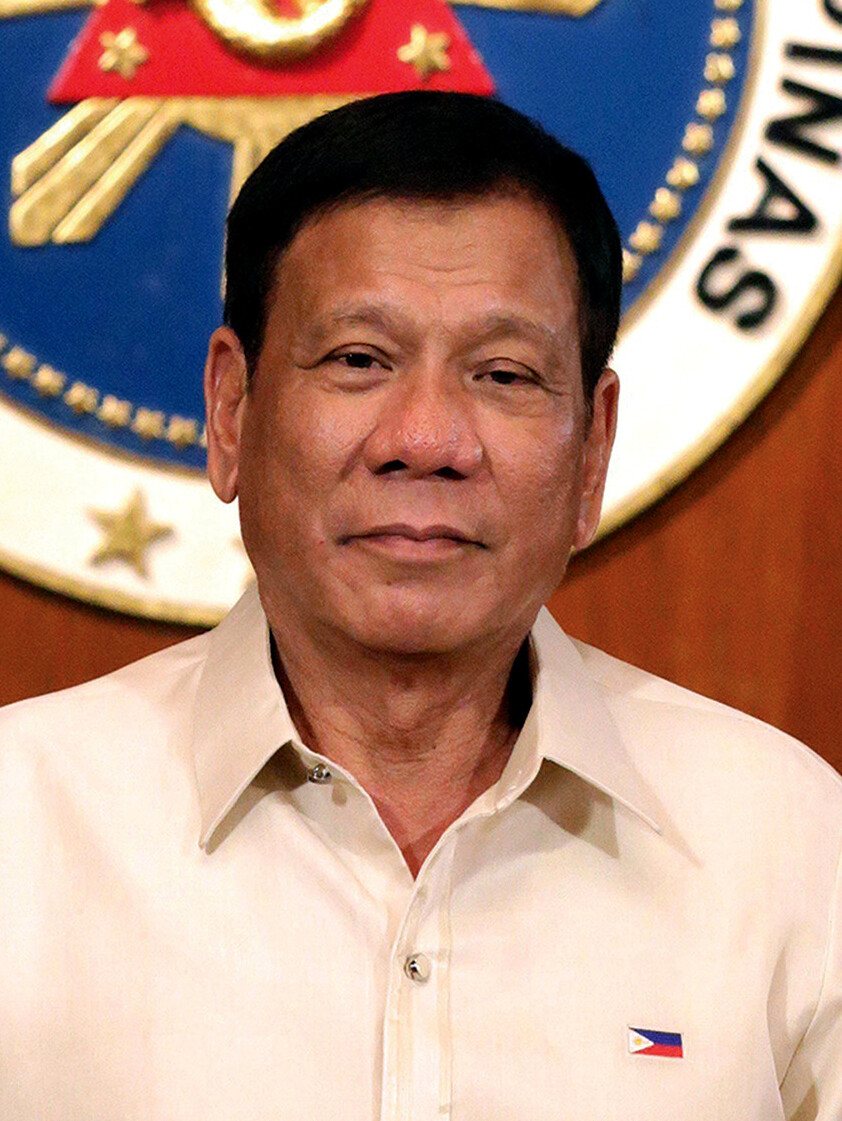
Rodrigo Duterte

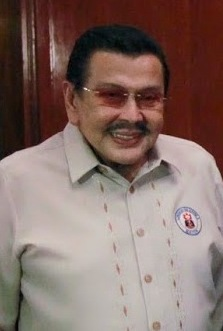
Joseph Estrada

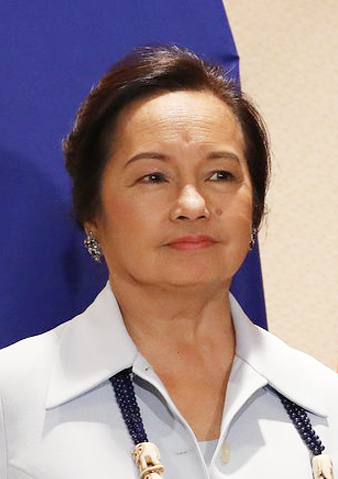
Gloria Macapagal Arroyo

- Rodrigo Duterte, 16th President of the Philippines (2016–2022), Mayor of Davao City (1988–1998, 2001–2010, 2013–2016), Vice Mayor of Davao City (1986–1987, 2010–2013), Davao City's 1st district representative (1998–2001), National Chairperson of PDP–Laban (2016–present), father of Sara Duterte (no endorsement for president)
- Joseph Estrada, 13th President of the Philippines (1998–2001), 9th Vice President of the Philippines (1992–1998), Senator of the Philippines (1987–1992), Mayor of Manila (2013–2019), Mayor of San Juan, Metro Manila (1969–1986), former film actor
- Gloria Macapagal Arroyo, 14th President of the Philippines (2001–2010), 10th Vice President of the Philippines (1998–2001), Senator of the Philippines (1992–1998), Pampanga's 2nd district representative (2010–2019), Speaker of the Philippine House of Representatives (2018–2019)

=== Cabinet-level officials ===
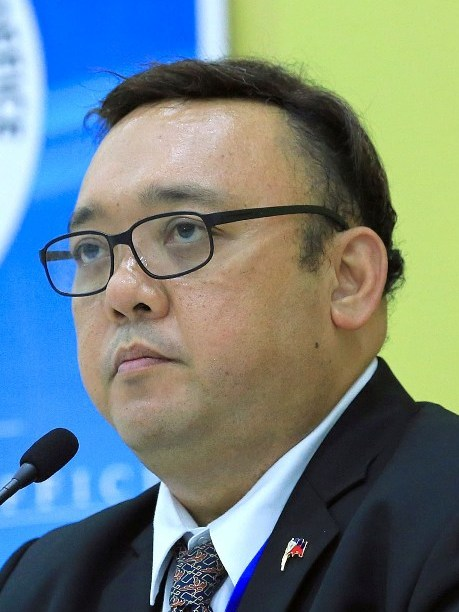
Harry Roque

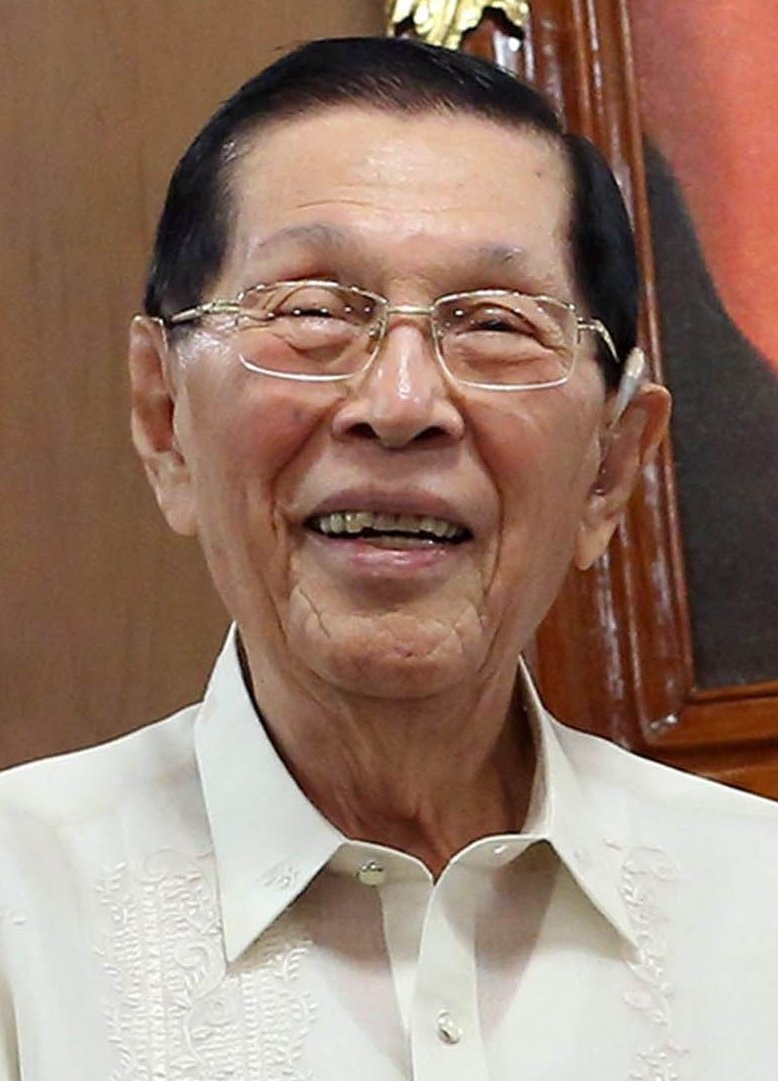
Juan Ponce Enrile

- Roy Cimatu, Secretary of Environment and Natural Resources (2017–2022), Chief of Staff of the Armed Forces of the Philippines (2002)
- Mike Defensor, Secretary of Environment and Natural Resources (2004–2006), Chairperson of the Housing and Urban Development Coordinating Council (2001–2004), Malacañang Chief of Staff (2006–2007), Anakalusugan party-list representative (2019–present), Quezon City's 3rd district representative (1995–2001), business executive, 2022 Quezon City mayoral candidate under the Partido Federal ng Pilipinas
- Ace Durano, Secretary of Tourism (2004–2010), Cebu's 5th district representative (1998–2004, 2013–2016), 2022 Cebu gubernatorial candidate under Partido Pilipino sa Pagbabago
- Hermogenes Ebdane, Secretary of Public Works and Highways (2007–2009), Governor of Zambales (2019–present), Chief of the Philippine National Police (2002–2004), retired police officer
- Juan Ponce Enrile, Minister of National Defense (1970–1971, 1972–1986), Secretary of Justice (1968–1970), Senator of the Philippines (1987–1992, 1995–2001, 2004–2016), President of the Senate of the Philippines (2008–2013), Philippine Senate Minority Leader (1987–1992, 2013–2014, 2015–2016), Cagayan's 1st district representative (1992–1995)
- Bayani Fernando, Chairperson of the Metro Manila Development Authority (2002–2009), Marikina's 1st district representative (2016–present), Secretary of Public Works and Highways (2003), 2010 vice presidential candidate, Mayor of Marikina, Metro Manila (1992–2001)
- Janette Garin, Secretary of Health (2015–2016), Iloilo's 1st district representative (2019–present)
- Jericho Petilla, Secretary of Energy (2012–2015), Governor of Leyte (2004–2012)
- Harry Roque, Presidential Spokesperson (2017–2018, 2020–2022), Kabayan party-list representative (2016–2017), 2022 senatorial candidate under UniTeam
- Mark Villar, Secretary of Public Works and Highways (2016–2021), Las Piñas representative (2010–2016), 2022 senatorial candidate under UniTeam
- Arthur Yap, Secretary of Agriculture (2004–2005, 2006–2007), Governor of Bohol (2019–present), Bohol's 3rd district representative (2010–2019)

=== National-level executive officials and civil servants ===
- Goddess Hope Libiran, former Assistant Secretary of Department of Transportation, columnist
- Gregorio Larrazabal, Commissioner of the Commission on Elections (2009–2011), 2022 Leyte's 4th district congressional candidate
- Marc Red Mariñas, former port operations chief of the Bureau of Immigration, 2022 Muntinlupa mayoral candidate under the People's Reform Party
- Christian Natividad, Chairperson of the Optical Media Board (2020–2021), Mayor of Malolos, Bulacan (2010–2019)
- Mocha Uson, Deputy Administrator of the Overseas Workers Welfare Administration (2019–present), Assistant Secretary for Social Media of the Presidential Communications Group (2017–2019), Movie and Television Review and Classification Board member (2017), singer, actress, dancer, member and co-founder of Mocha Girls, blogger, 2022 representative candidate for the Mothers for Change (MOCHA) party-list (endorsed Isko Moreno for president)

=== Diplomats ===
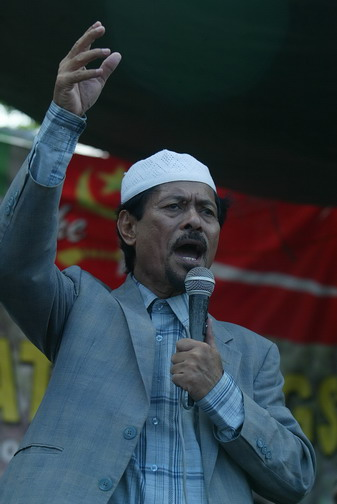
Nur Misuari

- Nur Misuari, founder and Chair of the Central Committee of the Moro National Liberation Front (1972–present), Special Economic Envoy to the Organization of Islamic Cooperation (2019–present), President of Bangsamoro Republik (2013), Governor of the Autonomous Region in Muslim Mindanao (1996–2001)

=== Philippine Congress ===
==== Senate ====
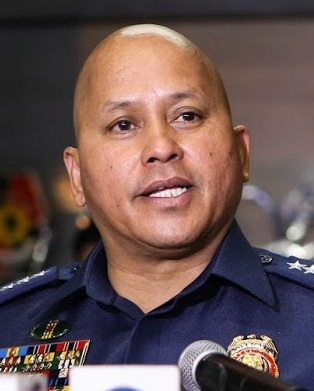
Ronald "Bato" dela Rosa

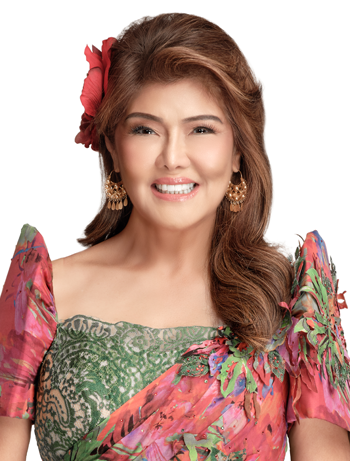
Imee Marcos

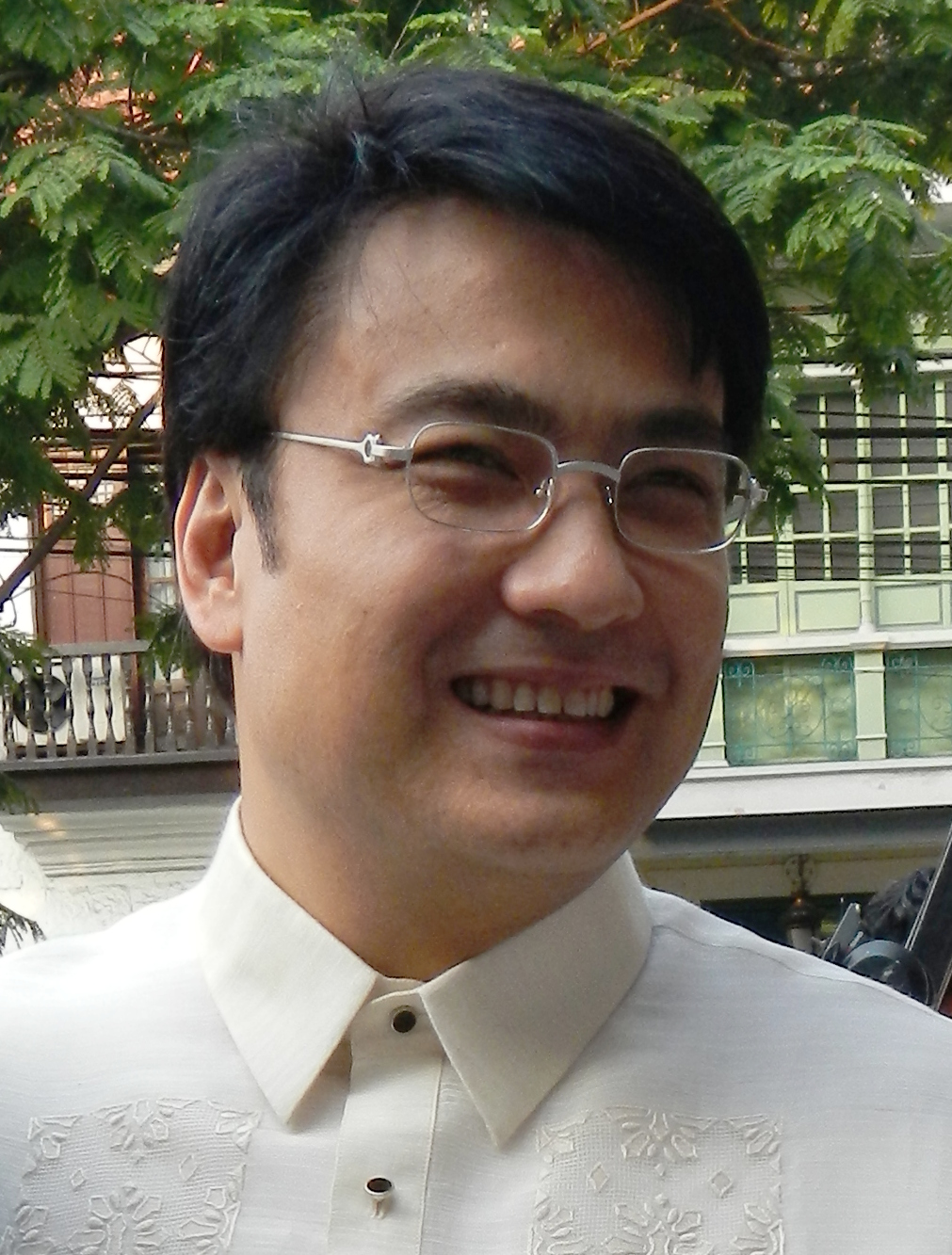
Bong Revilla

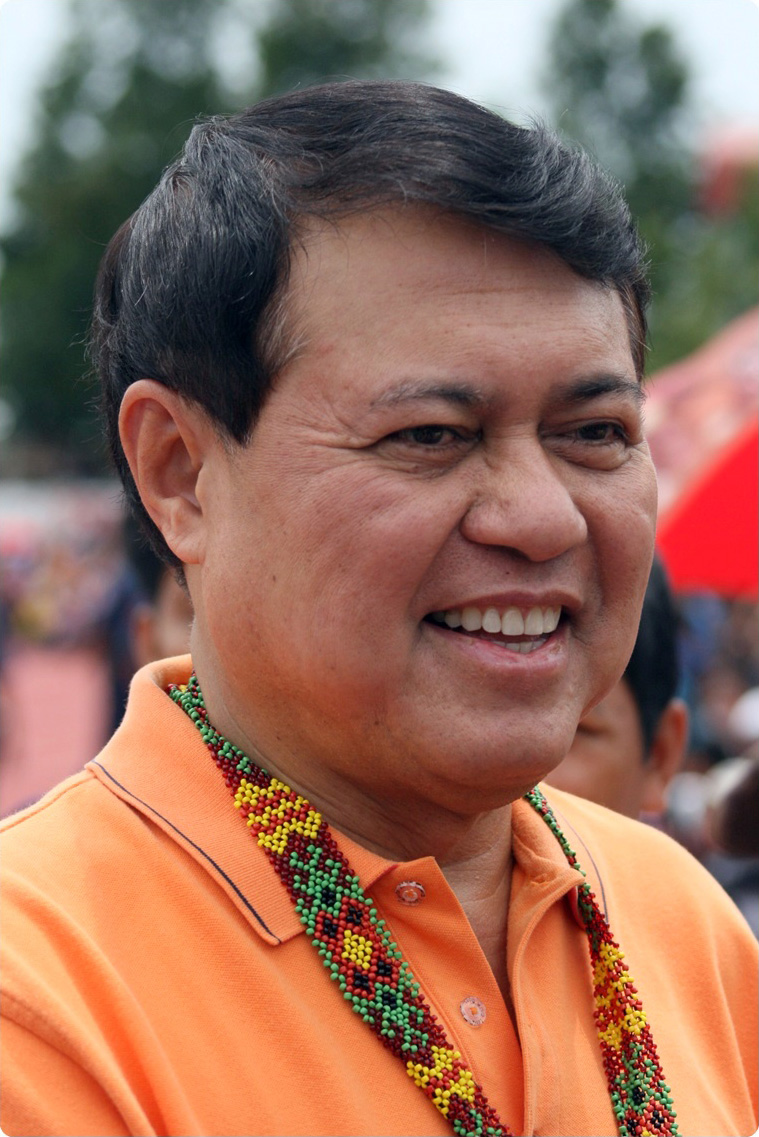
Manny Villar

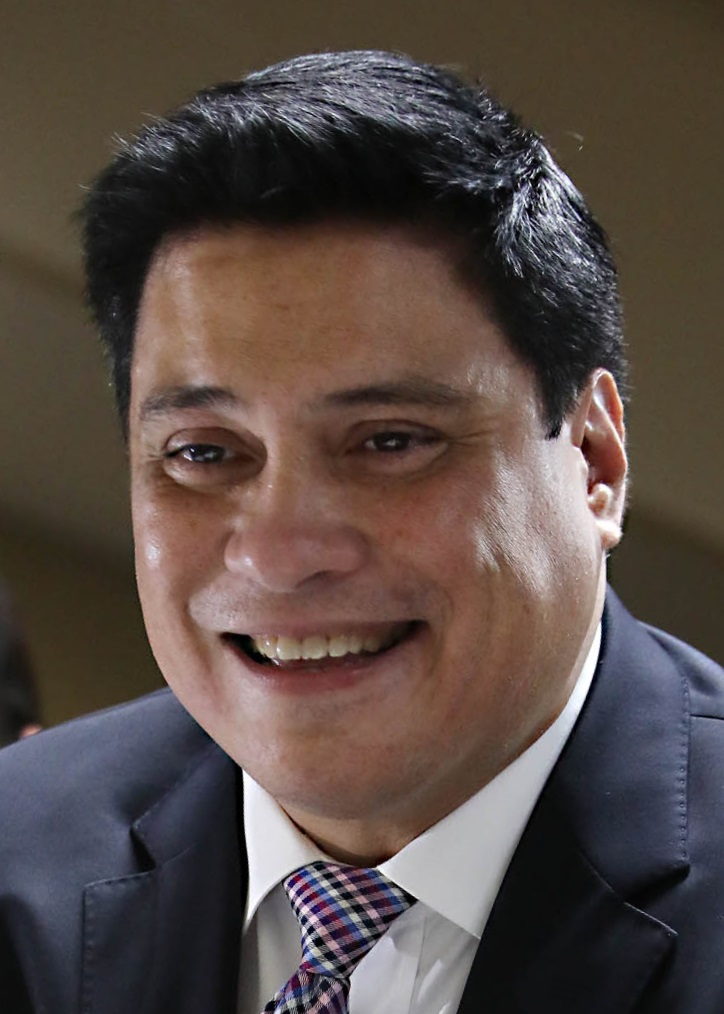
Migz Zubiri

- Ronald "Bato" dela Rosa, Senator of the Philippines (2019–present), Director-General of the Bureau of Corrections (2018), Chief of the Philippine National Police (2016–2018), city director of the Davao City police (2012–2013), retired police officer
- Win Gatchalian, Senator of the Philippines (2016–present), Valenzuela's 1st district representative (2001–2004, 2013–2016), Mayor of Valenzuela, Metro Manila (2004–2013)
- Bong Go, Senator of the Philippines (2019–present), Special Assistant to the President of the Philippines (2016–2018), personal aide to President Rodrigo Duterte since 1998
- Imee Marcos, Senator of the Philippines (2019–present), Governor of Ilocos Norte (2010–2019), Ilocos Norte's 2nd district representative (1998–2007), sister of Bongbong Marcos
- Bong Revilla, Senator of the Philippines (2004–2016, 2019–present), Co-chairperson of Lakas–CMD (2013–present), Governor of Cavite (1998–2001), Vice Governor of Cavite (1995–1998), Chairperson of the Videogram Regulatory Board (2002–2004), actor, television host
- Francis Tolentino, Senator of the Philippines (2019–present), Presidential Adviser on Political Affairs (2017–2018), Chairperson of the Metropolitan Manila Development Authority (2010–2015), Mayor of Tagaytay, Cavite (1995–2004)
- Manny Villar, Senator of the Philippines (2001–2013), President of the Senate of the Philippines (2006–2008), Las Piñas–Muntinlupa and Las Piñas (lone) representative (1992–2001), Speaker of the Philippine House of Representatives (1998–2000), 2010 presidential candidate, Chairperson of Vista Land
- Migz Zubiri, Senator of the Philippines (2007–2011, 2016–present), Philippine Senate Majority Leader (2008–2010, 2018–present), Bukidnon's 3rd district representative (1998–2007), businessman

==== House of Representatives ====
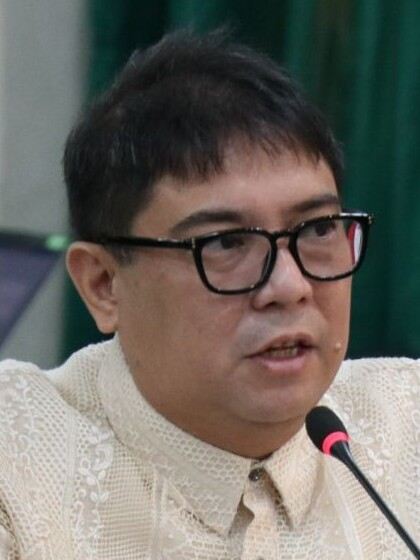
Mikey Arroyo

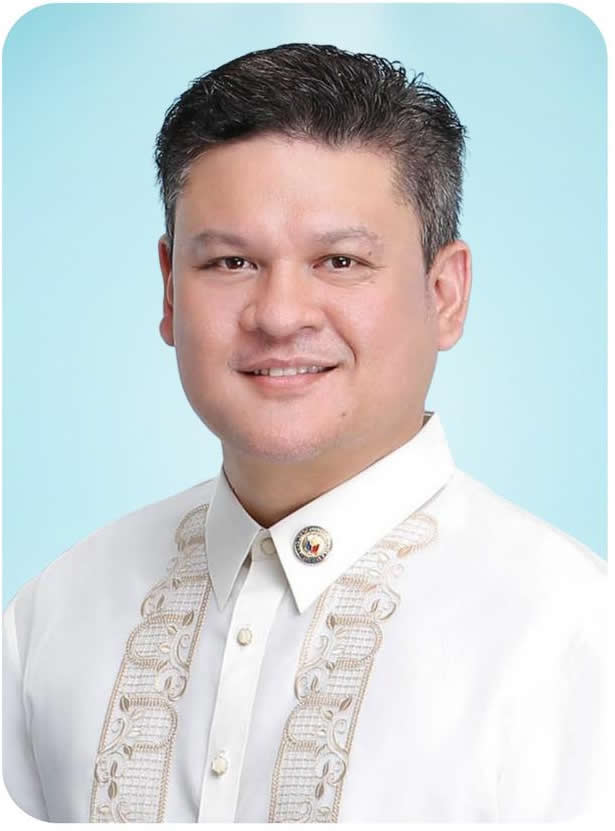
Paolo Duterte

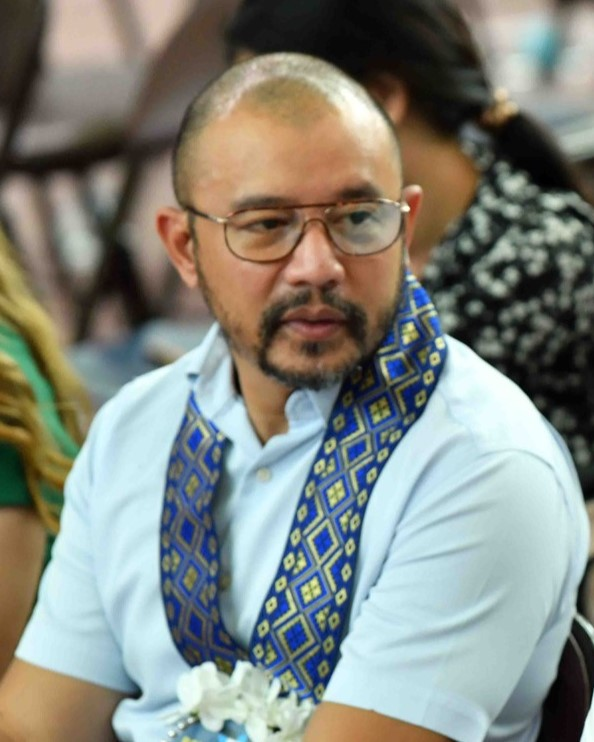
Seth Frederick P. Jalosjos

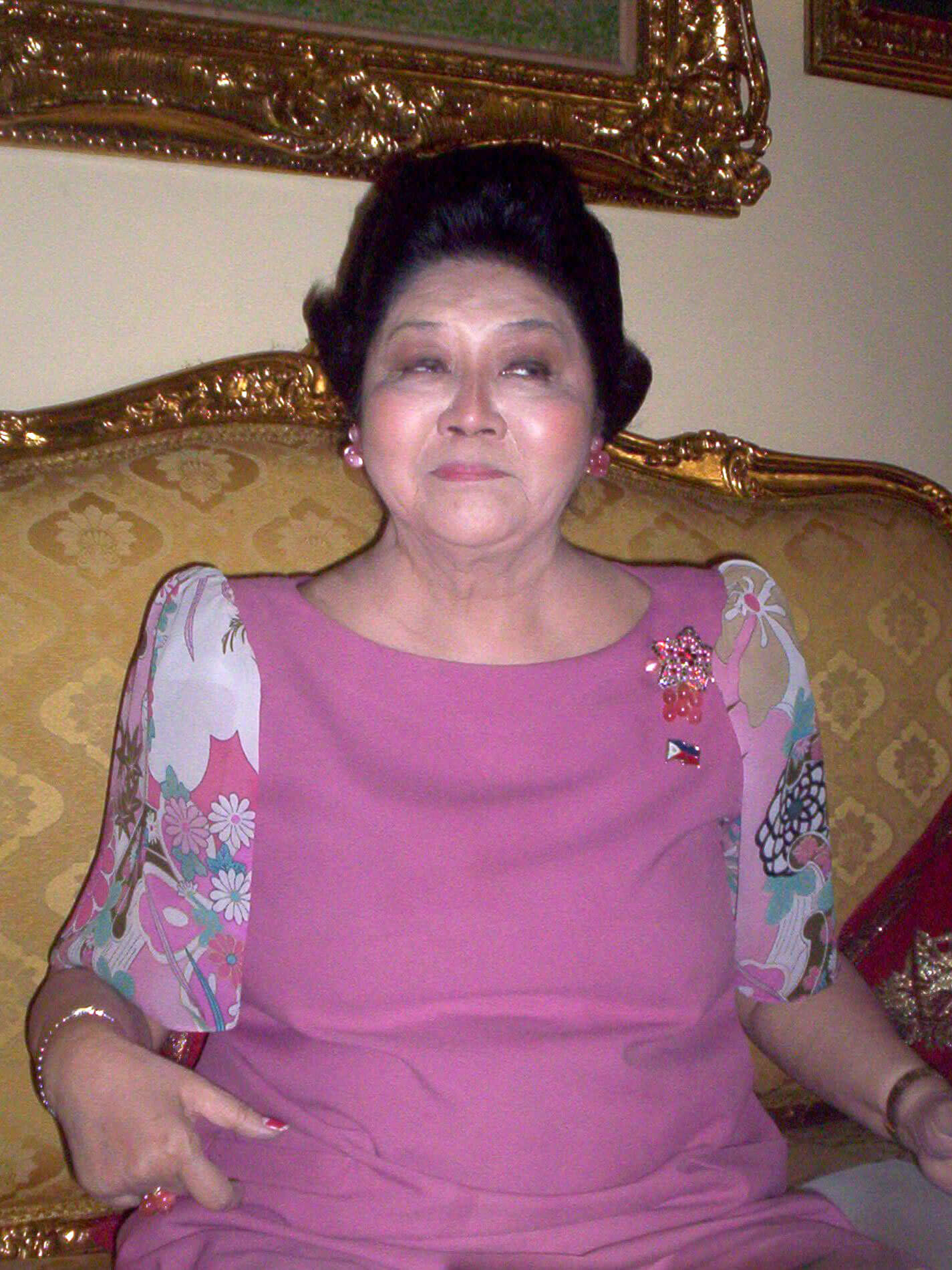
Imelda Marcos

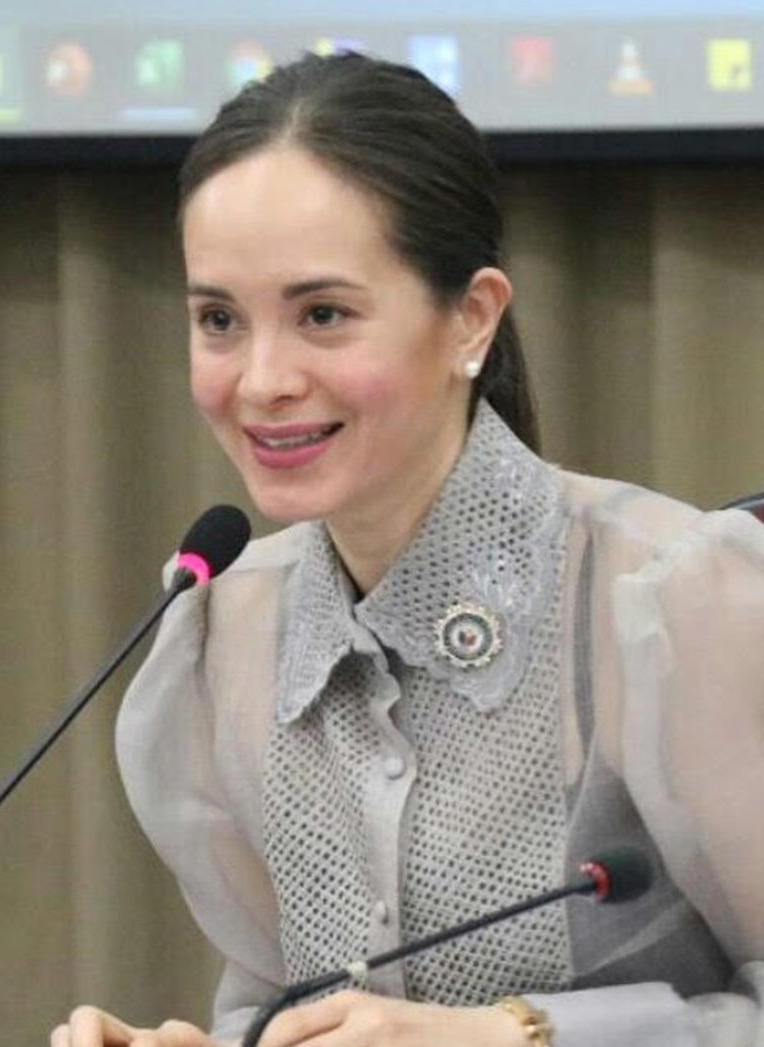
Lucy Torres-Gomez

- Mikey Arroyo, Pampanga's 2nd district representative (2004–2010; 2019–present)
- Ace Barbers, Surigao del Norte's 2nd district representative (1998–2007), Governor of Surigao del Norte (2007–2010)
- Albee Benitez, Negros Occidental's 3rd district representative (2010–2019), 2022 Bacolod mayoralty candidate
- Ferjenel Biron, Iloilo's 4th district representative (2004–2013, 2016–2019)
- Winston Castelo, Quezon City's 2nd district representative (2013–2019), Councilor of Quezon City's 2nd district (2019–present), 2022 Quezon City vice mayoral candidate under the Lakas-CMD
- Fredenil Castro, Capiz's 2nd district representative (2001–2010, 2013–present)
- Christopher de Venecia, Pangasinan's 4th district representative (2016–present), theater director, former actor (endorsed Leni Robredo for president)
- Alan Dujali, Davao del Norte's 2nd district representative (2019–present)
- Paolo Duterte, Davao City's 1st district representative (2019–present), Deputy Speaker of the Philippine House of Representatives (2019–2020), Vice Mayor of Davao City (2013–2018), brother of Sara Duterte
- Conrado Estrella III, Abono Partylist Representative (2013–present), Deputy Speaker of the Philippine House of Representatives (2019–present), Pangasinan's 6th District representative (1987–1995, 2001–2010)
- Rodolfo Fariñas, Ilocos Norte's 1st district representative (1998–2001, 2010–2019), Majority Floor Leader of the Philippine House of Representatives (2016–2018), Governor of Ilocos Norte (1988–1998), Mayor of Laoag, Ilocos Norte (1980–1986)
- Juliet Marie Ferrer, Negros Occidental's 4th district representative (2016–present), former mayor of La Carlota, Negros Occidental
- Richard Garin, Iloilo's 1st congressional district representative (2013–2019)
- Aurelio Gonzales Jr., Pampanga's 3rd district representative (2007–2013, 2016–present)
- Precious Hipolito-Castelo, Quezon City's 2nd district representative (2019–present), actress, newscaster
- Romeo M. Jalosjos Jr., Zamboanga del Norte's 1st district representative (2019–Present), Zamboanga Sibugay's 2nd district representative (2010–2013), Mayor of Tampilisan, Zamboanga del Norte (2007–2010)
- Seth Frederick P. Jalosjos, Zamboanga del Norte's 1st district representative (2010–2019), Zamboanga del Norte's 1st district Board Member (2007–2010)
- Julio Ledesma IV, Negros Occidental's 1st district representative (2007–2016)
- Manny Lopez, Manila's 1st district representative (2016–present), President of the Amateur Boxing Association of the Philippines (1993–2009), former vice president of the Philippine Olympic Committee
- Dale Malapitan, Caloocan's 1st district representative (2016–present)
- Rodante Marcoleta, Sagip party-list representative (2016–present), Alagad party-list representative (2004–2013), former senatorial candidate of UniTeam
- Imelda Marcos, First Lady of the Philippines (1965–1986), Governor of Metro Manila (1975–1986), Minister of the Interim Batasang Pambansa for Region IV (1978–1984), 1992 presidential candidate, Leyte's 1st district representative (1995–1998), Ilocos Norte's 2nd district representative (2010–2019), mother of Bongbong Marcos
- Eric Martinez, Valenzuela's 2nd district representative (2016–present), Vice Mayor of Valenzuela (2007–2016), Valenzuela's 2nd district councilor (2001–2007)
- Henry Oaminal, Misamis Occidental's 2nd district representative (2013–present), Deputy Speaker of the Philippine House of Representatives (2019–present), 2022 Misamis Occidental gubernatorial candidate
- Jose L. Ong Jr., Northern Samar's 2nd District representative (1987–1992; 2019–present), Governor of Northern Samar (2013–2019)
- Pablo Ortega, La Union's 1st district representative (2016–present), Mayor of San Fernando, La Union (2007–2016)
- Paz Radaza, Lapu-Lapu City representative (2019–present), 2022 Lakas–CMD candidate for Mayor of Lapu-Lapu City, Cebu
- Gilbert Remulla, Cavite's 2nd district representative (2001–2007), journalist
- Jesus Crispin Remulla, Cavite's 7th district representative (2010–2013, 2019–present), Deputy Speaker of the Philippine House of Representatives (2010–2013), Cavite's 3rd district representative (2004–2010), Governor of Cavite (2016–2019)
- Florida Robes, San Jose del Monte's at-large district representative (2016–present)
- Rufus Rodriguez, Cagayan de Oro's 2nd district representative (2007–2016, 2019–present), Deputy Speaker of the Philippine House of Representatives (2020–present), Commissioner of the Bureau of Immigration (1998–2001), lawyer (endorsed Leni Robredo for president)
- Xavier Jesus Romualdo, Camiguin representative (2013–present), 2022 Camiguin gubernatorial candidate
- Ricky Sandoval, Malabon representative (2016–2019), Malabon–Navotas representative (1998–2007)
- Joey Salceda, Albay's 2nd district representative (2016–present), Governor of Albay (2007–2016), Malacañang Chief of Staff (2007), Albay's 3rd district representative (1998–2007) (endorsed Leni Robredo for president)
- John Rey Tiangco, Navotas representative (2019–present), Mayor of Navotas, Metro Manila (2010–2019)
- Abraham Tolentino, Cavite's 8th district representative (2019–present), Deputy Speaker of the Philippine House of Representatives (2020–present), President of the Philippine Olympic Committee (2019–present), Cavite's 7th district representative (2013–2019), Mayor of Tagaytay, Cavite (2004–2013)
- Lucy Torres-Gomez, Leyte's 4th district representative (2010–2013, 2013–present), actress, television host, 2022 Ormoc mayoral candidate under the PDP–Laban
- Juliette Uy, Misamis Oriental's 2nd district representative (2013–present) (endorsed Leni Robredo for president)
- Gerardo Valmayor Jr., Negros Occidental's 1st district representative (2019–present)
- Lord Allan Velasco, Marinduque representative (2010–2013, 2016–present), Speaker of the Philippine House of Representatives (2020–present) (has openly endorsed Duterte only)
- Luis Raymund Villafuerte, Camarines Sur's 2nd district representative (2016–present), Governor of Camarines Sur (2004–2013) (no endorsement for president)
- Victor Yap, Tarlac's 2nd district representative (2016–present), Governor of Tarlac (2007–2016), Mayor of Victoria, Tarlac (1988–1998)
- Manuel "Way Kurat" Zamora, Davao de Oro's 1st district representative (2001–2010, 2019–present), Vice Governor of Davao de Oro (2013–2019)

=== Local government officials ===
==== Provincial officials ====
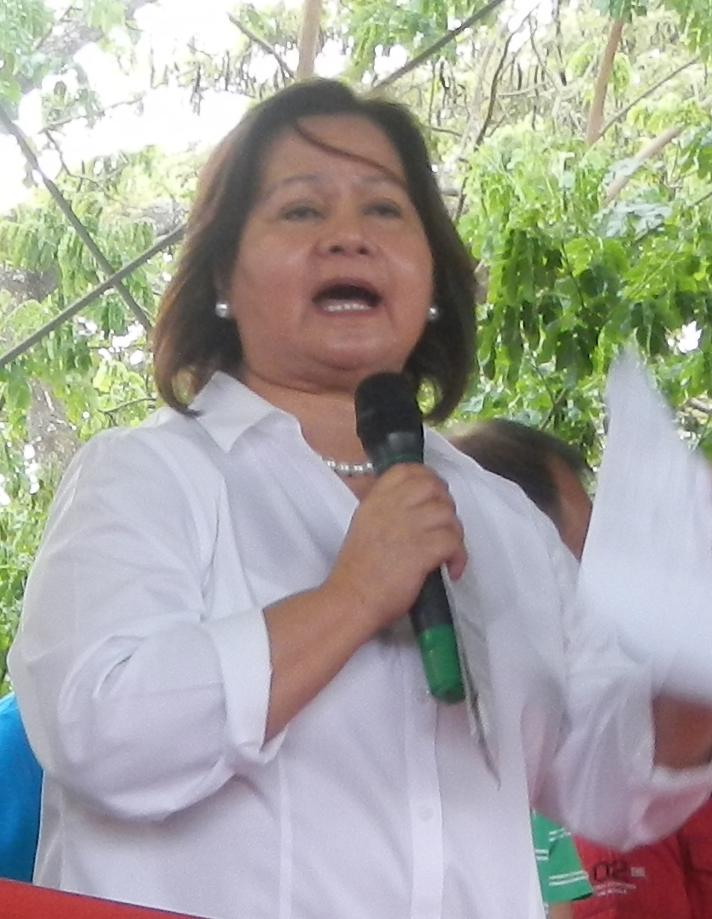
Lilia Pineda

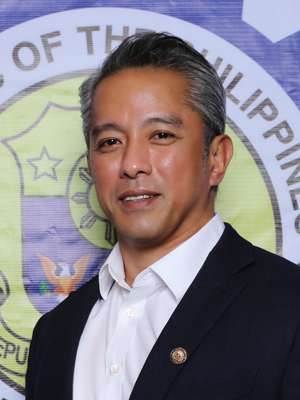
Jonvic Remulla

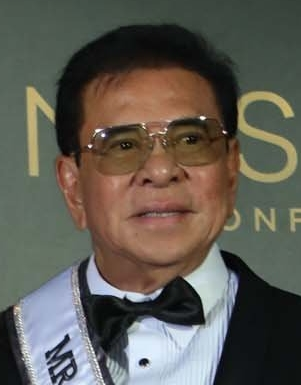
Chavit Singson

- Mamintal Alonto Adiong Jr., Governor of Lanao del Sur (2007–2016, 2019–present), Vice Governor of Lanao del Sur (2016–2019)
- Katherine Agapay, Vice Governor of Laguna (2016–present)
- Rodolfo Albano III, Governor of Isabela (2019–present), Isabela's 1st district representative (1998–2001, 2004–2010, 2013–2019), Vice Governor of Isabela (2010–2013)
- Maria Jocelyn Bernos, Governor of Abra (2016–present), Abra representative (2010–2016)
- Rhodora Cadiao, Governor of Antique (2015–present), Vice Governor of Antique (2004–2010, 2013–2015)
- Nancy Catamco, Governor of Cotabato
- Esteban Evan Contreras, Governor of Capiz (2019–present), Vice Governor of Capiz (2010–2019)
- Dale Corvera, Governor of Agusan del Norte (2019–present), Mayor of Cabadbaran, Agusan del Norte (2007–2016), Vice Governor of Agusan del Norte (2004–2007)
- Dakila Cua, Governor of Quirino (2019–present), Quirino's 1st district representative (2010–2019), Union of Local Authorities of the Philippines President
- Jerry Dalipog, Governor of Ifugao (2019–present), Mayor of Banaue, Ifugao (2016–2019)
- Roel Degamo, Governor of Negros Oriental (2011–present), Vice Governor of Negros Oriental (2010–2011)
- Anthony del Rosario, Governor of Davao del Norte (2006–2019), Hugpong ng Pagbabago Secretary-General
- Melchor Diclas, Governor of Benguet (2019–present), Mayor of Buguias, Benguet (2016–2019)
- Imelda Dimaporo, Governor of Lanao del Norte (1998–2007), Lanao del Norte's 1st district representative (2010–2016)
- Rogelio Espina, Governor of Biliran (2001–2010, 2019–present), Biliran's at-large district representative (2010–2019)
- Jeffrey Ferrer, Vice Governor of Negros Occidental
- Eduardo Gadiano, Governor of Occidental Mindoro (2013–present), Mayor of Sablayan, Occidental Mindoro (2010–2019)
- Albert Garcia, Governor of Bataan (2013–present), Bataan's 2nd district representative (2004–2013)
- Gwendolyn Garcia, Governor of Cebu (2004–2013, 2019–present), Cebu's 3rd district representative (2010–2019)
- Ramil Hernandez, Governor of Laguna (2016–present), Vice Governor of Laguna (2007–2010, 2010–2014)
- Antonio Kho, Governor of Masbate (2016–present)
- Jay Khonghun, Vice Governor of Zambales
- Bonifacio Lacwasan, Governor of Mountain Province (2016–present)
- Mark Ronald Lambino, Vice Governor of Pangasinan (2016–present)
- Mark Leviste, Vice Governor of Batangas (2007–2016, 2019–present), Batangas Provincial Board member (2004–2007)
- Manuel Mamba, Governor of Cagayan (2016–present)
- Hermilando Mandanas, Governor of Batangas (1995–2004, 2016–present), Batangas's 2nd district representative (2004–2013)
- Emmylou Taliño-Mendoza, Vice Governor of Cotabato
- Matthew Manotoc, Governor of Ilocos Norte (2019–present), Ilocos Norte Provincial Board member (2016–2019), nephew of Bongbong Marcos
- Damian Mercado, Governor of Southern Leyte (2007–2013, 2016–present), Southern Leyte representative (2013–2016), Mayor of Maasin, Southern Leyte (1998–2007)
- Bai Mariam Mangudadatu, Governor of Maguindanao
- Suharto Mangudadatu, Governor of Sultan Kudarat
- Florencio Miraflores, Governor of Aklan (2013–present)
- Francisco Emmanuel Ortega III, Governor of La Union (2016–present)
- Francisco "Paolo" Ortega, La Union Provincial Board member
- Leopoldo Petilla, Governor of Leyte (2013–present)
- Alexander Pimentel, Governor of Surigao del Sur (2019–present), Mayor of Tandag, Surigao del Sur (2014–2013, 2016–2019)
- Dennis Pineda, Governor of Pampanga (2019–present), Vice Governor of Pampanga (2013–2019), Mayor of Lubao, Pampanga (2001–2010)
- Lilia Pineda, Vice Governor of Pampanga (2019–present), Governor of Pampanga (2010–2019), Mayor of Lubao, Pampanga (1992–2001)
- Jonvic Remulla, Governor of Cavite (2010–2016, 2019–present), Vice Governor of Cavite (1998–2007)
- Jose Riano, Governor of Romblon (2019–present)
- Yshmael Sali, Governor of Tawi-Tawi (2019–present), Mayor of Languyan, Tawi-Tawi (2013–2019)
- Chavit Singson, Governor of Ilocos Sur (1972–1986, 1992–2001, 2004–2007, 2010–2013), Mayor of Narvacan, Ilocos Sur (2019–present), Ilocos Sur's 1st district representative (1987–1992), founding chairman of LCS Holdings, President of the Philippine National Shooting Association (2018–present)
- Ryan Luis Singson, Governor of Ilocos Sur (2013–present)
- Danilo Suarez, Governor of Quezon (2019–present), Quezon's 3rd district representative (1992–2001, 2004–2013, 2016–2019), Minority Floor Leader of the Philippine House of Representatives (2012–2013, 2016–2019), columnist
- Edgar Tallado, Governor of Camarines Norte (2010–present)
- Reynaldo Tamayo Jr., Governor of South Cotabato, president of the Partido Federal ng Pilipinas
- Abdusakur Mahail Tan, Governor of Sulu (2007–2013, 2019–present), Vice Governor of Sulu (2013–2016), Sulu's 1st district representative (1996–2001)
- Philip Tan, Governor of Misamis Occidental
- Reynolds Michael Tan, Governor of Samar (2019–present), Vice Governor of Samar (2019)
- Ferdinand Tubban, Governor of Kalinga (2019–present)
- Jayvee Uy, Governor of Davao de Oro (2016–present)
- Roberto Uy, Governor of Zamboanga del Norte (2013–present), Mayor of Dipolog, Zamboanga del Norte (1998–2007)
- Zaldy Villa, Governor of Siquijor (2013–present)
- Christopherson Yap, Vice Governor of Southern Leyte (2016–present)
- Susan Yap, Governor of Tarlac (2013–present)
- Rebecca Ynares, Governor of Rizal (2001–2004, 2013–present)
- Jose Maria Zubiri Jr., Governor of Bukidnon (2001–2010, 2013–present), Vice Governor of Bukidnon (2010–2013), Bukidnon's 3rd district representative (1987–1998), businessman

==== Local officials ====
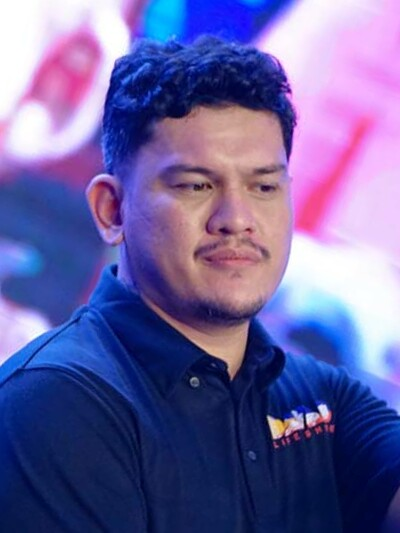
Sebastian Duterte

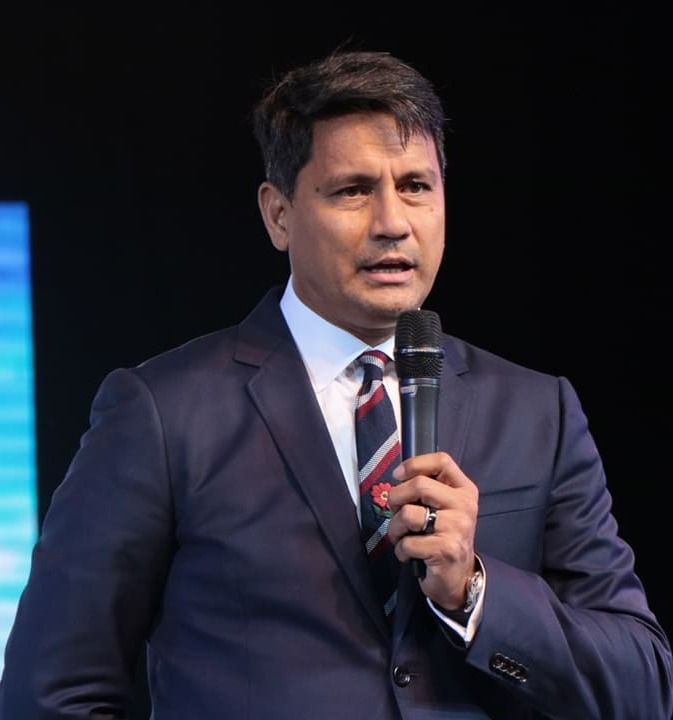
Richard Gomez

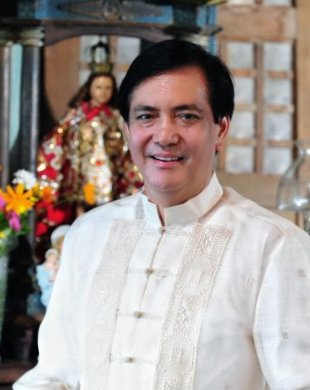
Mike Rama

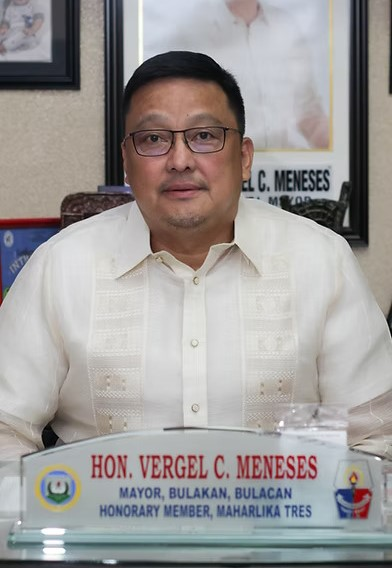
Vergel Meneses

- Melanie Abarientos, Mayor of Del Gallego, Camarines Sur
- Leonardo Agos, Mayor of Gainza, Camarines Sur
- Jose Maria Alonso, Mayor of Pontevedra, Negros Occidental
- John Paul Alvarez, Mayor of Ilog, Negros Occidental
- Cristy Angeles, Mayor of Tarlac City, Tarlac
- Jose Nadie Arceo, Mayor of Hinigaran, Negros Occidental
- Katrina Ballandres, Mayor of Kabasalan, Zamboanga Sibugay
- Kiko Barzaga, Councilor of Dasmariñas, Cavite
- Herbert Bautista, Mayor of Quezon City, Metro Manila (2010–2019), actor, 2022 senatorial candidate under UniTeam
- Iyo Bernardo, Vice Mayor of Pasig, Metro Manila (2013–present)
- Florencio Bernabe Jr., Mayor of Parañaque, Metro Manila (2004–2013)
- Cicero Borromeo, Mayor of Candoni, Negros Occidental
- Elisa Candingan, Mayor of Hinundayan, Southern Leyte
- Cris Castro, Councilor of Pandi, Bulacan
- Beng Climaco, Mayor of Zamboanga City (2013–present), Zamboanga City's 2nd district representative (2007–2013), Vice Mayor of Zamboanga City (2004–2007) (endorsed Leni Robredo for president)
- Sonny Coscolluela, former mayor of Murcia, Negros Occidental
- Ambrosio Cruz Jr., Mayor of Guiguinto, Bulacan
- Oliver Dator, Mayor of Lucban, Quezon
- Jessie de Jesus, Mayor of Calumpit, Bulacan
- Laurence Marxlen dela Cruz, Mayor of Salvador Benedicto, Negros Occidental
- Sebastian Duterte, Vice Mayor of Davao City (2019–present)
- Mauricio Domogan, Mayor of Baguio, Benguet (1992–2001, 2010–2019), Baguio representative (2001–2010)
- Marilyn Era, Mayor of Calatrava, Negros Occidental
- Manuel Escalante III, Mayor of Manapla, Negros Occidental
- Jose Espinosa III, former mayor of Iloilo City, 2022 Iloilo City's at-large congressional district candidate
- Ernesto Estrao, Mayor of Hinoba-an, Negros Occidental
- Ferdinand Estrella, Mayor of Baliuag, Bulacan
- Christina Frasco, Mayor of Liloan, Cebu (2016–present)
- Majul Gandamra, Mayor of Marawi, Lanao del Sur
- Jeffrey Ganzon, Vice Mayor of Iloilo City
- Jennifer Garin, Mayor of Guimbal, Iloilo
- Rex Gatchalian, Mayor of Valenzuela, Metro Manila (2013–present), 2022 NPC candidate for Valenzuela's 1st district representative
- Mark Andrew Arthur Golez, Mayor of Silay, Negros Occidental
- Richard Gomez, Mayor of Ormoc, Leyte (2016–present), actor, model, television personality, 2022 PDP–Laban candidate for Leyte's 4th district representative
- Eladio Gonzales, Mayor of Balagtas, Bulacan
- Renato Gustilo, Mayor of San Carlos, Negros Occidental
- Migay Ibasco, Mayor of Bula, Camarines Sur
- Rex Jalandoon, Mayor of La Carlota, Negros Occidental
- Richard Jaojoco, Mayor of Toboso, Negros Occidental
- Francis Albert Juan, Mayor of Bustos, Bulacan
- William Lachica, former mayor of Kalibo, Aklan
- Nelson Legaspi, Mayor of Canaman, Camarines Sur
- Chris Lizardo, Mayor of Minalabac, Camarines Sur
- Nilo Jesus Antonio Neil Lizares III, Mayor of Talisay, Negros Occidental
- Fermin Mabulo, Mayor of San Fernando, Camarines Sur
- Marvin Malacon, Mayor of Enrique B. Magalona, Negros Occidental
- Oscar Malapitan, Mayor of Caloocan, Metro Manila (2013–present), Caloocan's 1st district representative (2004–2013), Vice Mayor of Caloocan (1998–2001), Councilor of Caloocan (1992–1998)
- Rhumyla Nicor-Mangilimutan, Mayor of La Castellana, Negros Occidental
- Raulito Manlapaz, Mayor of Hagonoy, Bulacan
- Mary Ann Marcos, Mayor of Paombong, Bulacan
- Nerivi Santos-Martinez, Mayor of Talavera, Nueva Ecija
- Vergel Meneses, Mayor of Bulakan, Bulacan (2019–present), former basketball player and head coach (JRU Heavy Bombers, Pop Cola Panthers, Barangay Ginebra Kings)
- Lani Mercado, Mayor of Bacoor, Cavite (2016–present), Cavite's 2nd district representative (2010–2016), actress, 2022 Lakas–CMD candidate for Cavite's 2nd district representative
- Nacional Mercado, Mayor of Maasin, Southern Leyte
- Alejandro Mirasol, Mayor of Binalbagan, Negros Occidental
- Enrique Miravelles, Mayor of Valladolid, Negros Occidental
- Irene Montilla, Mayor of Isabela, Negros Occidental
- Mannix Ortega, Vice Mayor of San Juan, La Union
- Francis Frederick Palanca, Mayor of Victorias, Negros Occidental
- Miguel Antonio Peña, Mayor of Pulupandan, Negros Occidental
- Russel Pleyto, Mayor of Santa Maria, Bulacan
- Carl Jason Rama Bautista, Mayor of Kiblawan, Davao del Sur; 2022 Davao del Sur gubernatorial candidate
- Mike Rama, Mayor of Cebu City (2010–2016, 2021–present), Vice Mayor of Cebu City (2001–2010, 2019–2021)
- Edgardo Ramos, Mayor of Pila, Laguna
- Arthur Robes, Mayor of San Jose del Monte, Bulacan
- Victor Gerardo Rojas, Mayor of Murcia, Negros Occidental
- Weny Sabalbero, Mayor of Cabusao, Camarines Sur
- Jeannie Sandoval, former vice mayor of Malabon
- Jose Santiago, Mayor of Bocaue, Bulacan
- Edwin Santos, Mayor of Obando, Bulacan
- Ed Severo, Mayor of Calabanga, Camarines Sur
- Ricardo Silvestre, Mayor of Marilao, Bulacan
- John Rey Tabujara, Mayor of Cauayan, Negros Occidental
- Donya Tesoro, Mayor of San Manuel, Tarlac (2019–present), Vice Mayor of San Manuel (2016–2019)
- Toby Tiangco, Mayor of Navotas, Metro Manila (2000–2010, 2019–present), Navotas representative (2010–2019), Vice Mayor of Navotas (1998, 1999–2000), 2022 Partido Navoteño candidate for Navotas representative
- Roderick Tiongson, Mayor of San Miguel, Bulacan
- Rogelio Raymund Tongson Jr., Mayor of Himamaylan, Negros Occidental
- Jilson D. Tubillara, Mayor of San Enrique, Negros Occidental
- Peter Unabia, Vice Mayor of Gingoog, Misamis Oriental; 2022 Misamis Oriental gubernatorial candidate
- De Carlo "Oyo" Uy, former Councilor of Tagum, Davao del Norte
- Linabelle Villarica, Mayor of Meycauayan, Bulacan
- Cipriano Violago Jr., Mayor of San Rafael, Bulacan
- Anastacia Vistan, Mayor of Plaridel, Bulacan
- Melecio Yap Jr., Mayor of Escalante, Negros Occidental (2007–2016, 2019–present)
- Cecilio Ynares, Vice Mayor of Binangonan, Rizal (2016–present), Mayor of Binangonan, Rizal (2007–2016)
- Cesar Ynares, Mayor of Binangonan, Rizal (1998–2007, 2016–present)
- Ella Celestina Yulo, Mayor of Moises Padilla, Negros Occidental
- Nicholas Yulo, Mayor of Bago, Negros Occidental (2016–present)
- Francis Zamora, Mayor of San Juan, Metro Manila (2019–present), Vice Mayor of San Juan (2010–2016), Councilor of San Juan (2007–2010), former basketball player (De La Salle Green Archers)

=== Military and police officials ===
==== High-rank officials ====
- Danilo Abinoja, Commandant of the Philippine Coast Guard (2007–2008)
- Damian Carlos, Commandant of the Philippine Coast Guard (2006–2007)
- Benjamin Defensor Jr., Chief of Staff of the Armed Forces of the Philippines (2002)
- Avelino Razon Jr., Chief of the Philippine National Police (2007–2008)
- Dionisio Santiago, Chief of Staff of the Armed Forces of the Philippines (2002–2003)
- Felimon Santos Jr., Chief of Staff of the Armed Forces of the Philippines (2020)

==== Medal of Valor awardees ====
- Noel Buan, Brigadier general of the Philippine Army (2004)
- Roy Cuenca, Staff Sergeant of the Philippine Army (1991)
- Lucio Curig, Staff Sergeant of the Philippine Army (2000)
- Leopoldo Diokno, Staff Sergeant of the Philippine Army (2004)
- Hilario Estrella, Colonel of the Philippine Army (2014)
- Bienvenido Fajemolin, Sergeant of the Philippine Army (1977)
- Francisco Granfil, Sergeant of the Philippine Army (1988)
- Ariel Querubin, Colonel of the Philippine Marine Corps (2000–2010)
- Robert Salvador, Captain of the Philippine Army (2016)

==== Service and area commanders ====
- John S. Bonafos, retired lieutenant general of the Philippine Army
- Emamanuel R. Carta, retired lieutenant general of the Philippine Army
- Eugenio V. Cedo, retired lieutenant general of the Philippine Army
- Jaime de los Santos, Commanding General of the Philippine Army (2001–2002), Superintendent of the Philippine Military Academy, Supreme Commander of the United Nations' International Force East Timor (INTERFET), Supreme Commander of the United Nations Transitional Administration in East Timor (UNTAET)
- Ireneo C. Espino, retired lieutenant general of the Philippine Army
- Rene V. Medina, vice admiral of the Philippine Navy, executive director of the STCW Office of the Maritime Industry Authority
- Raul S. Urgello, lieutenant general of the Philippine Army (1998–1999)

==== General and service officers ====
- Alphonsus P. Crucero, former major general of the Philippine Army
- Prospero C. Noble Jr., former major general of the Philippine National Police

=== Political parties, organizations, and alliances ===
- Barug Alang sa Kauswagan ug Demokrasya
- Hugpong ng Pagbabago
- Kambilan
- Kilusang Bagong Lipunan
- Labor Party Philippines
- Lakas–CMD
- League of Municipal Mayors-Cebu
- Malayang Quezon City
- Moro Islamic Liberation Front (endorsed Leni Robredo for president)
- Moro National Liberation Front (except from its Chairman Muslimim Sema, minister of Labor and Employment of Bangsamoro)
- Nacionalista Party
- One Cebu (except for its 3rd district officials who are endorsing Isko Moreno)
- PDP–Laban (Cusi faction)
- Partido Federal ng Pilipinas
- Partido Pilipino sa Pagbabago
- Philippine Councilors League
- Pwersa ng Masang Pilipino
- Reform Party
- Tawi-Tawi One Party
- Trade Union Congress Party
- United Nationalist Democratic Organization

== Non-political endorsements ==
=== Business executives and leaders ===
- Chase Y. Cokaliong, vice president of Cokaliong Shipping Lines
- Bryan C. Lim, vice president for product development of Suyen Corporation
- Dioceldo Sy, founder and owner of Ever Bilena and Blackwater Bossing

=== Media personalities ===
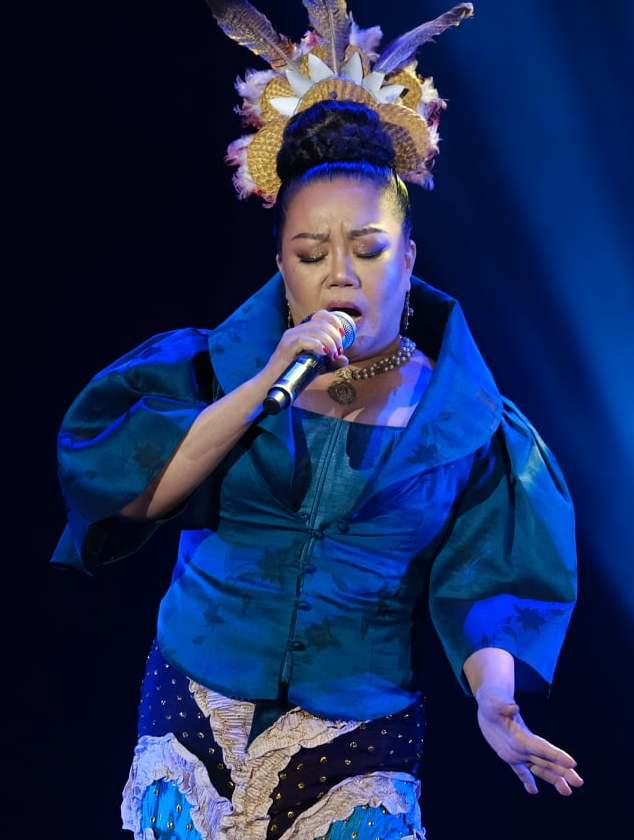
Dulce

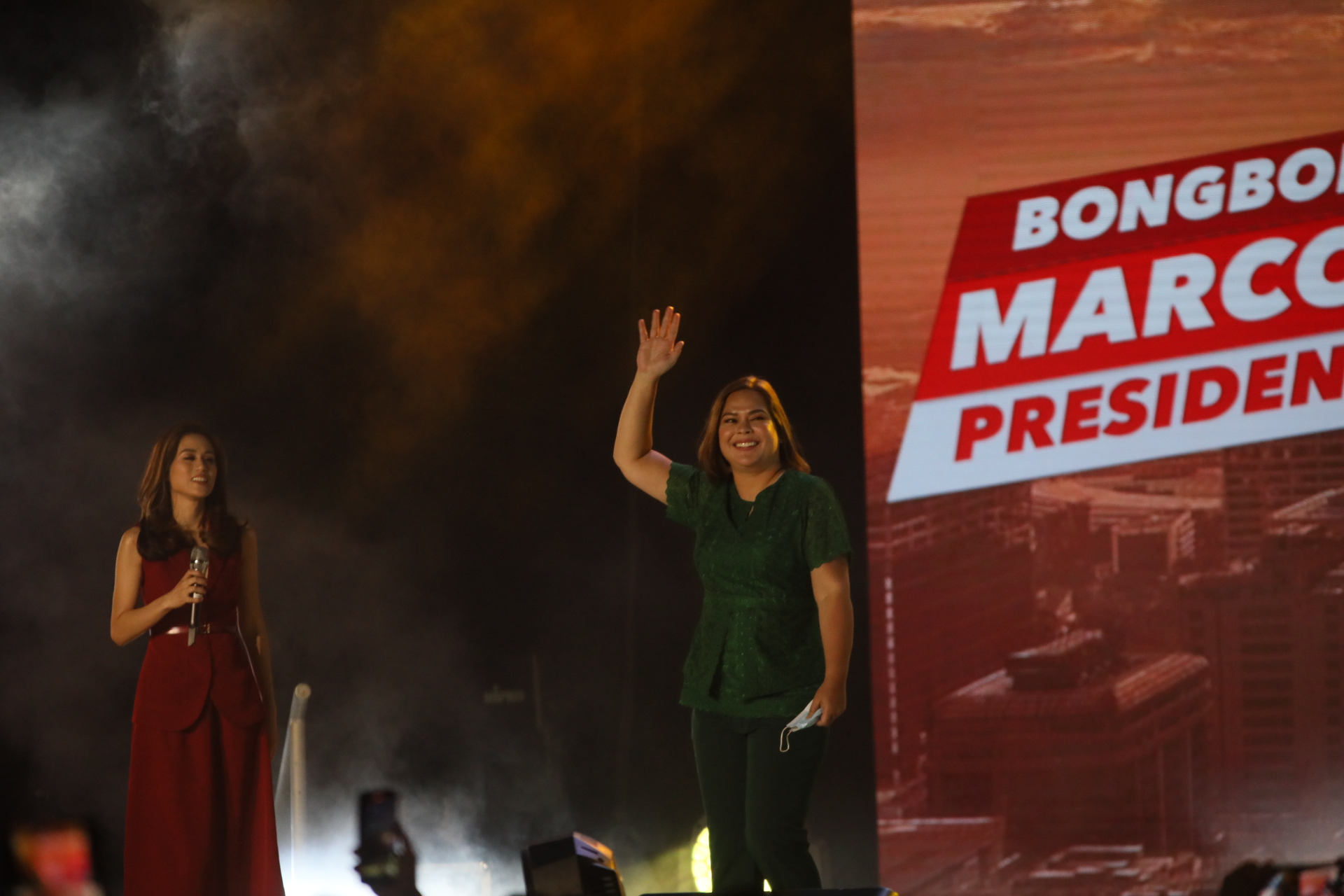
Toni Gonzaga at the UniTeam proclamation rally

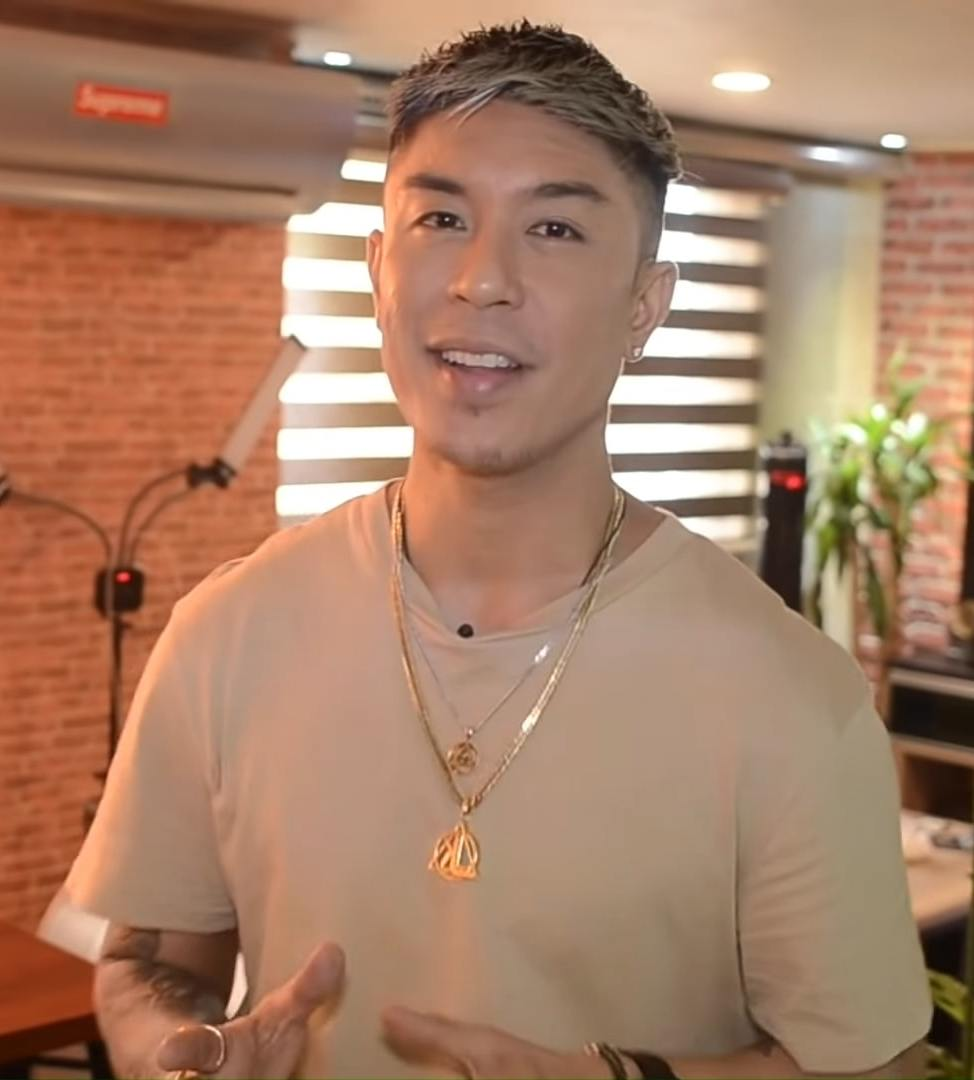
Kris Lawrence

- Bayani Agbayani, comedian, actor, singer, television host
- Aegis, rock band
- Archie Alemania, actor
- Alden Richards, actor, model (endorsed Sara Duterte for vice president)
- Isay Alvarez, theatre actress
- Andrew E., rapper, record producer
- Cat Arambulo-Antonio, socialite, social media influencer
- Nora Aunor, actress, National Artist for Film and Broadcast Arts
- Claudine Barretto, actress, 2022 PDP–Laban candidate for Councilor of Olongapo
- Geneva Cruz, singer, former member of Smokey Mountain, sergeant
- Cueshé, pop rock band
- Ai-Ai delas Alas, actress, comedienne
- DJ Loonyo, disc jockey, dancer, model, actor, choreographer, social media influencer formerly based in China
- Bugoy Drilon, singer-songwriter, actor
- Dulce, singer, actress
- Karla Estrada, actress, host, 2022 representative candidate for the Tingog party-list
- Jason Fernandez, lead vocal and guitarist of Rivermaya (2007–2011)
- Pops Fernandez, singer, entrepreneur, entertainer, television host, actress
- Lyca Gairanod, singer, actress, The Voice Kids winner
- Toni Gonzaga, actress, host, singer, vlogger
- Members of the rock band Hagibis
- Katrina Halili, actress
- Mike Hanopol, singer, former bass guitarist of the Juan de la Cruz Band, rabbi
- Kris Lawrence, singer-songwriter
- Diego Loyzaga, actor
- Aiko Melendez, actress, Councilor of Quezon City from the 2nd district (2001–2010)
- Cesar Montano, actor, film producer, director
- Daryl Ong, singer-songwriter
- Elizabeth Oropesa, actress
- Daphne Oseña-Paez, television personality, news reporter, author, UNICEF Goodwill Ambassador
- Robin Padilla, actor, 2022 senatorial candidate under UniTeam
- Michael Pangilinan, singer-songwriter, actor, model
- Plethora, band
- Roderick Paulate, actor
- Willie Revillame, television host, singer, businessman
- Richard Reynoso, recording artist, singer, producer, director, host
- Beverly Salviejo, actress
- Salbakuta, rap group formed by Andrew E.
- Isko "Brod Pete" Salvador, actor, comedian
- Randy Santiago, actor, comedian, singer, songwriter
- Gerald Santos, actor, singer
- Robert Seña, theatre actor
- Paul Soriano, director, producer
- Vivian Velez, Director-General of the Film Academy of the Philippines, actress (endorsed Isko Moreno for president)
- Renz Verano, singer
- Cris Villonco, singer, theater actress, granddaughter of Armida Siguion-Reyna
- Darryl Yap, director, writer
- Dawn Zulueta, actress
- Maine Mendoza, actress, TV host (endorsed Sara Duterte for vice president)

=== Sports figures ===
- Jean Asis, volleyball player (FEU Tamaraws)
- Ash Cañete, volleyball player (FEU Tamaraws)
- Lycha Ebon, volleyball player (FEU Tamaraws)
- Michele Gumabao, volleyball player (De La Salle Lady Spikers, Creamline Cool Smashers), beauty queen (Miss Globe 2018, Miss Universe Philippines 2020), 2022 representative candidate for the Mothers for Change (MOCHA) party-list
- Shiela Kiseo, volleyball player (FEU Tamaraws)
- Niks Medina, volleyball player (FEU Tamaraws)
- Arwind Santos, basketball player (FEU Tamaraws, NorthPort Batang Pier)
- Chen Tagaod, volleyball player (FEU Tamaraws)

=== Other public figures ===
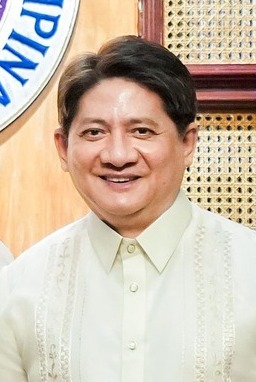
Larry Gadon

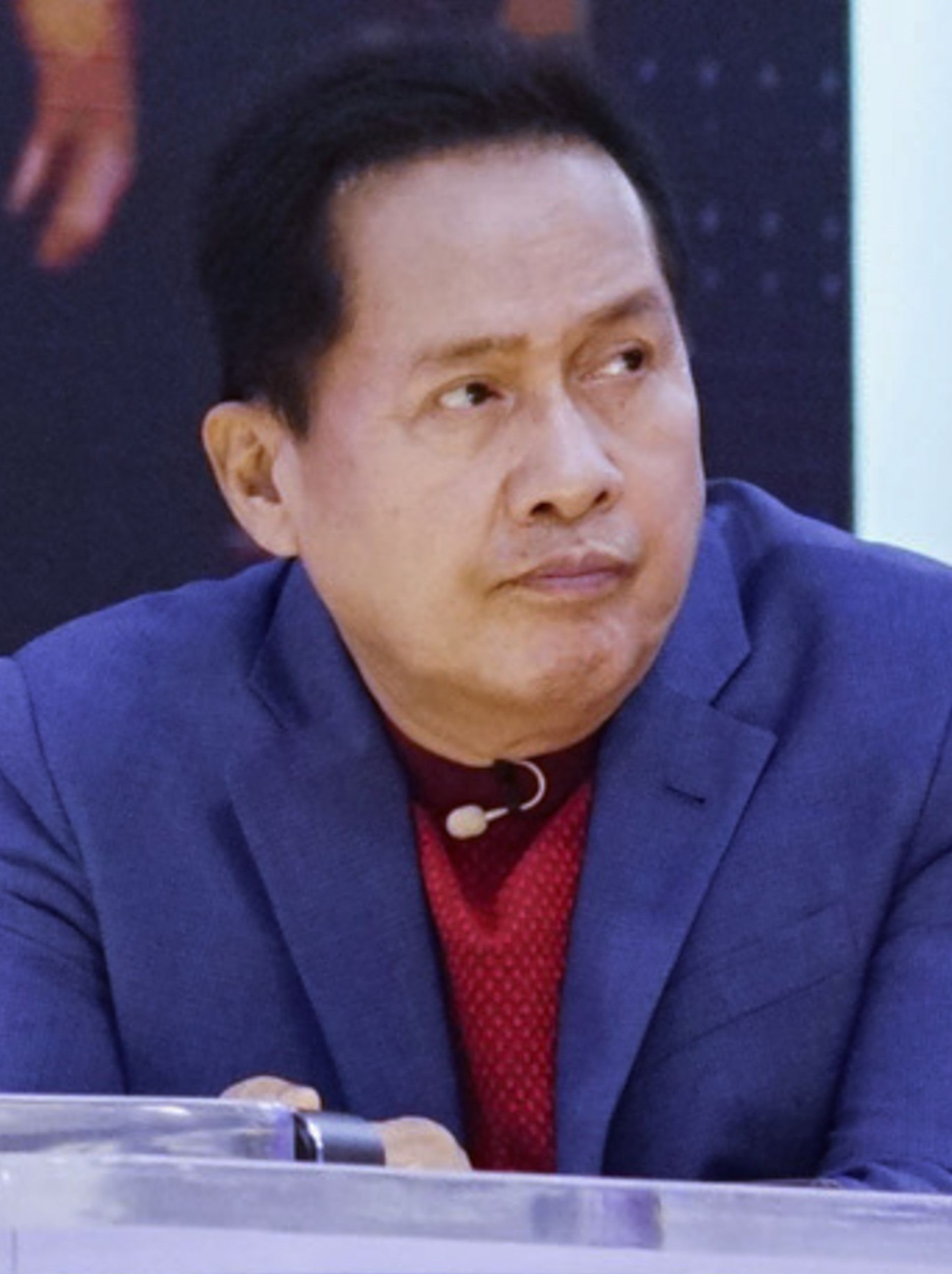
Apollo Quiboloy

- Jeffrey "Ka Eric" Celiz, former New People's Army cadre, 2022 Abante Sambayanan party-list nominee
- Larry Gadon, lawyer, 2022 senatorial candidate under UniTeam
- Alex Lopez, lawyer, 2022 Manila mayoral candidate under the Partido Federal ng Pilipinas
- Sandro Marcos, 2022 representative candidate for Ilocos Norte's 1st district, son of Bongbong Marcos
- Apollo Quiboloy, pastor, church leader of the Kingdom of Jesus Christ
- Mike Velarde, founder and "Servant Leader" of El Shaddai

=== Organizations ===
==== Advocacy groups ====
- Advocates and Keepers Organization of OFWS (AKO-OFW)
- Alyansang Duterte-Bongbong
- BAROG 2.0 (Batan-on Alang kay Rody Gihapon)
- Filipinos for Peace, Justice and Prosperity Movement
- People's Patriotic Movement
- Movement for Reform and Regional Development toward New Economic Cultural Cooperation

==== Cooperatives ====
- National Federation of Transport Cooperative

==== Educational institutions ====
- University of Manila
- University of Perpetual Help System

==== Fraternity groups ====
- Scouts Royale Brotherhood International Service Fraternity and Sorority

==== LGBTQ+ groups ====
- LGBT Pilipinas
- United Beki of the Philippines

==== Religious groups and Christian movements ====
- El Shaddai (movement)
- Iglesia ni Cristo
- Independent Bishops Conference of the Philippines

==== Trade unions ====
- Trade Union Congress of the Philippines

==== Transport groups ====
- Liga ng Transportasyon at Operators sa Pilipinas
- Motorcycle Federation of the Philippines, Inc.
- Tricycle Operators and Drivers Association of the Philippines Inc.

==== Sectorial groups ====
- United Lights of Pangasinan
- Visayas for Isko-Sara (VISA) (endorsed Isko Moreno for president)

== See also ==
- List of Leni Robredo 2022 presidential campaign endorsements
