= List of major acts and legislation during the presidency of Bongbong Marcos =

This is a list of major acts and legislation which were signed by Philippine President Bongbong Marcos, including landmark bills which lapsed into law during his presidency. He has signed 249 laws in the 19th Congress, 60 of which are national in scope.

Republic Acts, Executive Orders (including the Implementing Rules and Regulations (IRRs)), Proclamations, Administrative Orders (& IRRs), Memorandum Circulars, and Memorandum Orders are all compiled and published by the Official Gazette.

== Major acts and legislation ==
=== 2022 ===
R. A. No.	Title / Description	Date signed	Ref.
11934	Subscriber Identity Module (SIM) Card Registration Act	October 10, 2022	
11935	An Act Postponing the December 2022 Barangay and SK Elections	October 10, 2022	

=== 2023 ===
R. A. No.	Title / Description	Date signed	Ref.
11938	Charter of the City of Carmona	February 23, 2023	
11939	An Act further strengthening professionalism and promoting the continuity of policies and modernization initiatives in the Armed Forces of the Philippines, and amending for this purpose Republic Act No. 11709	May 17, 2023	
11953	New Agrarian Emancipation Act	July 7, 2023	
11954	Maharlika Investment Fund Act	July 18, 2023	
11956 (Note: Lapsed into law without the signature of President Bongbong Marcos)	An Act further amending Republic Act No. 11213, otherwise known as the "Tax Amnesty Act", as amended by Republic Act No. 11569, by extending the period of availment of the Estate Tax Amnesty until June 24, 2025, and for other purposes	August 5, 2023	
11957	An Act recognizing the Municipality of Baler in Aurora Province as the "Birthplace of Philippine Surfing"	August 6, 2023	
11958	An Act rationalizing the disability pension of Veterans, amending for the purpose Republic Act No. 6948, entitled, "An Act standardizing and upgrading the benefits for Military Veterans and their Dependents", as amended	August 24, 2023	
11959	Regional Specialty Centers Act	August 24, 2023	
11960	OTOP Philippines Act	August 24, 2023	
11961	An Act strengthening the conservation and protection of Philippine cultural heritage through cultural mapping and an enhanced cultural education program, amending for the purpose Republic Act No. 10066, otherwise known as the "National Cultural Heritage Act of 2009"	August 24, 2023	
11962	Trabaho Para sa Bayan Act	September 27, 2023	
11964	Automatic Income Classification of Local Government Units Act	October 26, 2023	
11965	Caregivers' Welfare Act	November 23, 2023	
11966	Public-Private Partnership (PPP) Code of the Philippines	December 5, 2023	
11967	Internet Transactions Act of 2023	December 5, 2023	

=== 2024 ===
R. A. No.	Title / Description	Date signed	Ref.
11976	Ease of Paying Taxes Act	January 5, 2024	
11977	Pampanga State Agricultural University-Floridablanca Campus Act	February 15, 2024	
11979	Polytechnic University of the Philippines (PUP)-Parañaque City Campus Act	February 15, 2024	
11980	Revised Bulacan State University Charter	February 15, 2024	
11981	Tatak Pinoy (Proudly Filipino) Act	February 26, 2024	
11982	An Act granting benefits to Filipino octogenarians and nonagenarians, amending for the purpose Republic Act No. 10868, otherwise known as the "Centenarians Act of 2016", and appropriating funds therefor	February 26, 2024	
11983	New Philippine Passport Act	March 11, 2024	
11984	No Permit, No Exam Prohibition Act	March 11, 2024	
11985	Philippine Salt Industry Development Act	March 11, 2024	
11995	Philippine Ecosystem and Natural Capital Accounting System (PENCAS) Act	May 22, 2024	
11996	Eddie Garcia Law	May 24, 2024	
11997	Kabalikat sa Pagtuturo Act	May 31, 2024	
11999	Bulacan Special Economic Zone and Freeport Act	June 13, 2024	
12000	Negros Island Region Act	June 11, 2024	
12001	Real Property Valuation and Assessment Reform Act	June 13, 2024	
12006	Free College Examinations Act	June 14, 2024	
12009	New Government Procurement Act	July 20, 2024	
12010	Anti-Financial Account Scamming Act (AFASA)	July 20, 2024	
12019	The Loss and Damage Fund Board Act	August 28, 2024	
12021	Magna Carta of Filipino Seafarers	September 23, 2024	
12022	Anti-Agricultural Economic Sabotage Act	September 26, 2024	
12023	An Act amending Sections 105, 108, 109, 110, 113, 114, 115, 128, 236, and 288 and adding new Sections 108-A and 108-B of the National Internal Revenue Code of 1997, as amended	October 2, 2024	
12024	Self-Reliant Defense Posture (SRDP) Revitalization Act	October 8, 2024	
12027	An Act discontinuing the use of the mother tongue as medium of instruction from kindergarten to grade 3, providing for its optional implementation in monolingual classes, and amending for the purpose Sections 4 and 5 of Republic Act No. 10533, otherwise known as the "Enhanced Basic Education Act of 2013"	October 10, 2024	
12028	Academic Recovery and Accessible Learning (ARAL) Program Act	October 16, 2024	
12063	Enterprise-Based Education and Training (EBET) Framework Act	November 7, 2024	
12064	Philippine Maritime Zones Act	November 7, 2024	
12065	Philippine Archipelagic Sea Lanes Act	November 7, 2024	
12066	An Act amending Sections 27, 28, 32, 34, 57, 106, 108, 109, 112, 135, 237, 237-A, 269, 292, 293, 294, 295, 296, 297, 300, 301, 308, 309, 310, and 311, and adding new Sections 135-A, 295-A, 296-A, and 297-A of the National Internal Revenue Code of 1997, as amended, and for other purposes	November 8, 2024	
12073	The Bacoor Assembly of 1898 Act	November 7, 2024	
12076	Ligtas Pinoy Centers Act	December 6, 2024	
12077	Student Loan Payment Moratorium During Disasters and Emergencies Act	December 6, 2024	
12078	An Act amending Republic Act No. 8178 or the "Agricultural Tariffication Act", as amended by Republic Act No. 11203	December 6, 2024	
12079	An Act creating a VAT refund mechanism for non-resident tourists, adding a new section 112-A to the National Internal Revenue Code of 1997, as amended, for the purpose	December 6, 2024	
12080	Basic Education Mental Health and Well-Being Promotion Act	December 6, 2024	

=== 2025 ===
R. A. No.	Title / Description	Date signed	Ref.
12120	Philippine Natural Gas Industry Development Act	January 8, 2025	
12122	An Act fixing the term of office of the Philippine Coast Guard Commandant and for other purposes	February 18, 2025	
12123	An Act resetting the first regular sessions in the Bangsamoro Autonomous Region in Muslim Mindanao, amending for the purpose Section 13, Article XVI of Republic Act No. 11054, as amended, otherwise known as the "Organic Law for the Bangsamoro Autonomous Region in Muslim Mindanao"	February 19, 2025	
12124	Expanded Tertiary Education Equivalency and Accreditation Program (ETEEAP) Act	March 3, 2025	
12145	Economic, Planning, and Development Act	April 10, 2025	
12160	Philippine Islamic Burial Act	April 11, 2025	
12174	Chemical Weapons Prohibition Act	April 15, 2025	
12177	Free Legal Assistance for Military and Uniformed Personnel Act	April 15, 2025	
12178	National Education Support Personnel Day Act	April 15, 2025	
12179	An Act amending Section 50 of Republic Act No. 9136, otherwise known as the "Electric Power Industry Reform Act of 2001"	April 18, 2025	
12180	PHIVOLCS Modernization Act	April 24, 2025	
12199	Early Childhood Care and Development System Act	May 8, 2025	
12209	An Act rationalizing the safety measures and penalties relative to the operation of motorcycles, amending for the purpose Republic Act No. 11235, otherwise known as "Motorcycle Crime Prevention Act"	May 9, 2025	
12215	Philippine Agriculturists Act	May 29, 2025	
12216	National Housing Authority Act	May 29, 2025	
12224	An Act declaring the first day of February of every year as the national day of awareness on hijab and other traditional garments and attire	June 18, 2025	
12231	Government Optimization Act	August 4, 2025	
12232	An Act Setting the Term of Office of Barangay Officials and Members of the Sangguniang Kabataan, and for Other Purposes	August 13, 2025	
12233	Judiciary Fiscal Autonomy Act	August 14, 2025	
12234	Konektadong Pinoy Act	August 24, 2025	
12252	An Act Liberalizing the Lease of Private Lands by Foreign Investors, Establishing the Stability of Long-Term Lease Contracts, Amending for the Purpose Republic Act No. 7652, Otherwise Known as the Investors’ Lease Act	September 3, 2025	
12253	Enhanced Fiscal Regime for Large-Scale Metallic Mining Act	September 4, 2025	
12254	E-Governance Act	September 5, 2025	
12287	Declaration of State of Imminent Disaster Act	September 12, 2025	
12288	Career Progression System for Public School Teachers and School Leaders Act	September 12, 2025	
12289	Accelerated and Reformed Right-of-Way (ARROW) Act	September 12, 2025	
12290	Virology and Vaccine Institute of the Philippines (VIP) Act	September 12, 2025	
12305	Philippine National Nuclear Energy Safety Act	September 18, 2025	
12312	Anti-POGO Act of 2025	October 23, 2025	
12313	Lifelong Learning Development Framework (LLDF) Act	October 23, 2025	

=== 2026 ===
R. A. No.	Title / Description	Date signed	Ref.
12315	An Act Extending the Term of the Second Congressional Commission on Education, Amending for the Purpose Republic Act No. 11899 or the “Second Congressional Commission on Education (EDCOM II) Act”	March 5, 2026	
12316	An Act Authorizing the President to Suspend or Reduce Excise Tax on Petroleum Products, Amending for the Purpose Section 148 of the National Internal Revenue Code of 1997, as Amended	March 25, 2026	
12317	An Act Resetting the First Regular Elections in the Bangsamoro Autonomous Region in Muslim Mindanao, Amending for the Purpose Section 13, Article XVI of the Republic Act No. 11054, as Amended, Otherwise Known As The “Organic Law for the Bangsamoro Autonomous Region in Muslim Mindanao”	March 25, 2026	
12321	Last Mile and GIDA Schools Act	July 22, 2026	
12322	An Act Allowing the Department of Education the Flexibility to Determine the Pedagogical Approaches to be Implemented in the Basic Education Curriculum, Amending for the Purpose Section 5 of Republic Act No. 10533, or ‘the “Enhanced Basic Education Act of 2013”	August 2, 2026	
12325	An Act Enchancing the Universal Access to Quality Tertiary Education Act, Amending for the Purpose Republic Act No. 10931, and Appropriating Funds Therefor	September 4, 2026	
12326	An Act Fixing the Term of Office of Barangay Officials and Members of the Sangguniang Kabataan to Five (5) Years, Amending Republic Act No. 12232 or "An Act Setting the Term of Office of Barangay Officials and Members of the Sangguniang Kabataan, and for Other Purposes	September 24, 2026	
12327	Basic Education Voucher Assistance Act	November 12, 2026	

== National Budget ==
R. A. No.	Title / Description	Date signed	Ref.
11936	General Appropriations Act of 2023	December 16, 2022	
11975	General Appropriations Act of 2024	December 20, 2023	
12116	General Appropriations Act of 2025	December 30, 2024	
12314	General Appropriations Act of 2026	January 5, 2026	
