= Ray T. Reyes =

Filipino politician

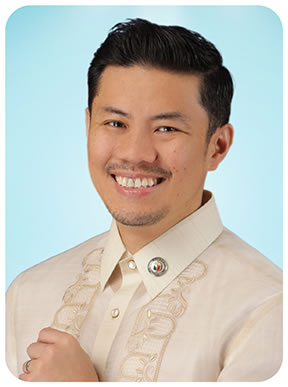
- Official portrait, 2022

Member of the Philippine House of Representatives for AnaKalusugan Partylist
- In office June 30, 2022 – June 30, 2025
- Preceded by: Mike Defensor

Personal details
- Born: Ray Florence Tolentino Reyes; August 12, 1981 (age 45) Manila, Philippines
- Education: Ateneo de Manila University (BS); Harvard Business School (EE)
- Occupation: Politician
- Profession: Businessman

Ray Florence Tolentino Reyes (born August 12, 1981) is a Filipino politician who served as the Representative for AnaKalusugan Partylist from 2022 to 2025.

== Early life and education ==
Ray T. Reyes was born on August 12, 1981 in Manila, Philippines. He received his early education from the Don Bosco Technical College Mandaluyong. He studied management information systems at Ateneo de Manila University and later completed the president management program at Harvard Business School Executive Education.

== Business career ==
From 2003 to 2016, Reyes was a project manager at Comnet Management Corporation, then served as vice president for business development from 2016 to 2017, and became its president in 2017. He was the general manager of First Bay Power Corporation from 2005 to 2016 and its president from 2017 to June 2022. He also worked as a business development manager at Adventureland International Leisure Corporation from 2013 to June 2022. Since 2013, he has been the president of B.T.G. Holdings.

== Political career ==
In 2022, Reyes was elected as first nominee for AnaKalusugan Party List. As the party's representative, he has focused on healthcare policies aimed at improving accessibility and expanding specialized services in rural areas. Reyes introduced House Bill No. 3134, which became Republic Act No. 11959, known as the Regional Specialty Centers Act.

During the 19th Congress, Reyes serves on twelve congressional committees, including roles as Vice Chairperson of the Committee on Health, the Special Committee on Food Security, and the Special Committee on Southern Tagalog Development. By March 2024, he had authored 163 House Bills, including the Ease of Paying Taxes Act (RA 11976), the New Agrarian Emancipation Act (RA 11953), the New Philippine Passport Act (RA 11983) and the aforementioned Regional Specialty Centers Act (RA 11959).

Several of Reyes' proposed bills advanced to the third reading in the House of Representatives. These include the Magna Carta for Barangay Health Workers (HB 06557), the Philippine Centers for Disease Prevention and Control Act (HB 06522), Amendments to the Anti-Agricultural Smuggling Act of 2016 (HB 03917), Amendments to the Philippine Clean Air Act of 1999, otherwise known as the Waste Treatment Technology Act (HB 06444), the Virology and Vaccine Institute of the Philippines Act (HB 06452) and the Basic Education Mental Health and Well-Being Promotion Act (HB 06574).

Reyes also plans to submit a bill proposing an increase in excise tax for alcoholic beverages.

In his role as Vice Chairperson of the Committee on Health, Reyes pressed PhilHealth about its plans to make up for the years that it failed to improve its outdated case rates and benefit packages, noting that under the Universal Healthcare Act, patients’ out-of-pocket expenses should only stand at around 35% of their total hospital bills. This prompted PhilHealth to commit an increase to 50% before the 2024 ends.
