= Bacoor Assembly =

Historic event in the Philippines

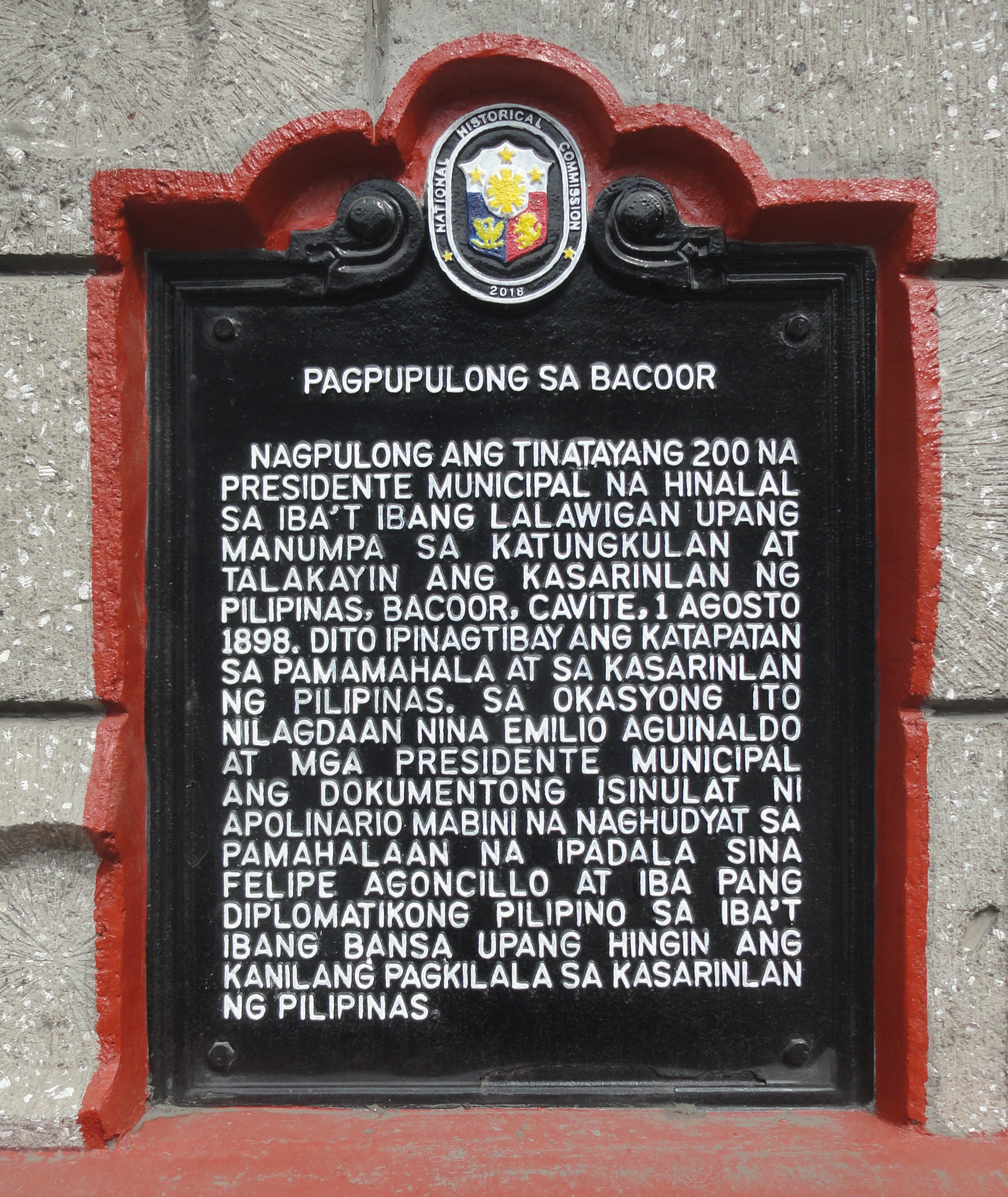
- NHCP historical marker at Cuenca Ancestral House
- Date: August 1, 1898
- Venue: Bacoor, Cavite, Philippines
- Organised by: Revolutionary Government of the Philippines

The Bacoor Assembly was a historic meeting held on August 1, 1898, in Bacoor, Cavite, Philippines. The assembly was convened to promulgate the Philippine independence from Spanish colonial rule, which President Emilio Aguinaldo had declared earlier in June 1898 in Kawit, Cavite.

The assembly was held at the Cuenca Ancestral House, which served as the seat of Aguinaldo's revolutionary government. Apolinario Mabini, serving as the legal and constitutional adviser, drafted the Act of Independence used at the Bacoor Assembly, which was signed by around 200 local officials representing 16 provinces in the country. Then, Aguinaldo approved the said Act, which was disseminated worldwide.

== Outcome ==
In September 1898, the Malolos Congress ratified the Bacoor Assembly document as Acta Agusto Uno.

The Philippines' declaration of independence, however, was not recognized internationally. In December 1898, the Treaty of Paris was signed, in which Spain ceded the Philippines to the US.

== Recognitions ==
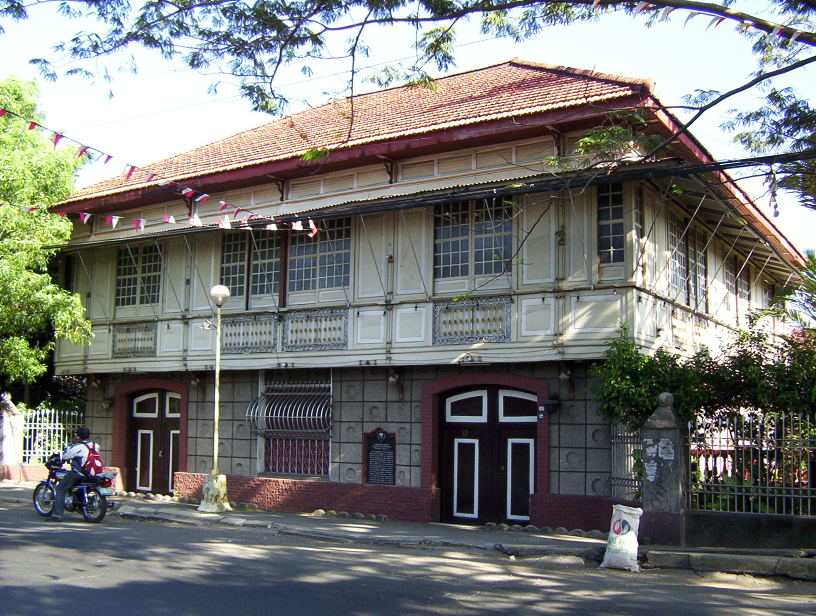
Cuenca Ancestral House

In 2018, the National Historical Commission of the Philippines installed a historical marker at the Cuenca Ancestral House to mark the venue of the Bacoor Assembly. In addition, in 2024, the Philippine government approved the Republic Act No. 12073, also known as the Bacoor Assembly of 1898 Act, declaring August 1 as a special working holiday.
