= 2022 Muntinlupa local elections =

Philippine election

2022 Muntinlupa mayoral election
- May 9, 2022
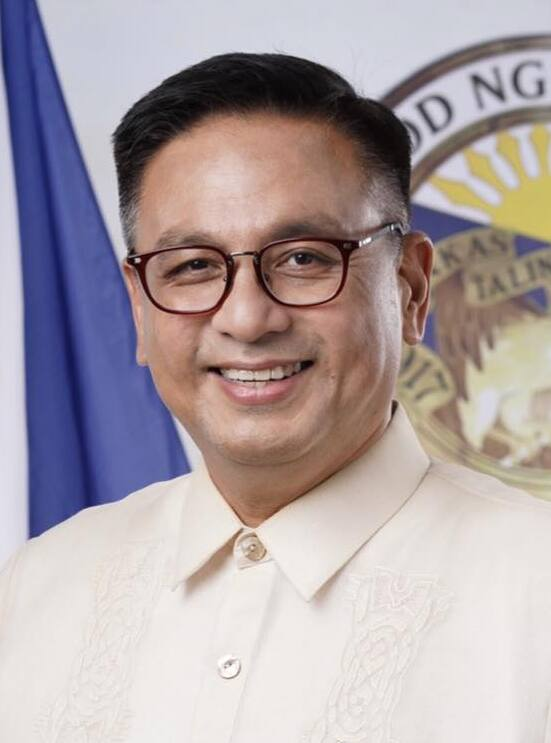
Nominee	Ruffy Biazon	Red Mariñas
Party	1Munti	PRP
Running mate	Artemio Simundac	Eulogio Dioko II
Popular vote	180,742	60,434
Percentage	74.26%	24.83%
Mayor before election
Jaime Fresnedi
Liberal
Elected mayor
Ruffy Biazon
1Munti

Local elections took place in Muntinlupa on May 9, 2022, within the 2022 Philippine general election. Voters elected the elective local posts in the city: the mayor, vice mayor, the congressman, and the 16 councilors, eight each in the two local legislative districts of Muntinlupa.

== Background ==
Incumbent mayor Jaime Fresnedi is term-limited. Despite being eligible for a third and final consecutive term, incumbent representative Ruffy Biazon chose to run for mayor, thus switching places with Fresnedi, who will run in his place for a seat in Congress, with incumbent vice mayor Artemio Simundac as Biazon's running mate. They are running under the ticket of One Muntinlupa, a local party, with Fresnedi running under the Liberal Party.

Former Bureau of Immigration commissioner and 2019 mayoralty candidate Marc Red Mariñas and Eulogio Dioko II, son of former vice mayor Celso Dioko, will also run for mayoralty and vice mayoralty posts under the People's Reform Party.

== Candidates ==
One Muntinlupa

One Muntinlupa
#	Name	Party
For Representative
1.	Jaime Fresnedi	Liberal
For Mayor
2.	Ruffy Biazon	1Munti
For Vice Mayor
2.	Artemio Simundac	1Munti
For Councilor (1st District)
2.	Ate Rachel Arciaga	1Munti
4.	Ivee Arciaga-Tadefa	1Munti
5.	Paty Katy Boncayao	1Munti
6.	Allan Camilon	1Munti
8.	Raul Corro	1Munti
10.	Alexson Diaz	1Munti
14.	Ting Niefes	1Munti
16.	Jedi Presnedi	1Munti
For Councilor (2nd District)
1.	Lester Baes	1Munti
2.	Ryan Bagatsing	1Munti
3.	Luvi Constantino	1Munti
9.	Arlene Hilapo	1Munti
13.	Eliot Martinez	1Munti
16.	Dado Moldez (Note: Dado Moldez substituted Estrellita "Letty" Santiago, who withdrew from the race on October 5, 2021, days after filing her certificate of candidacy.)	1Munti
17.	Marissa Rongavilla	1Munti
19.	Jun “Metong” Sevilla	1Munti

Notes

Team Red Mariñas

People's Reform Party/Team Red Mariñas
#	Name	Party
For Representative
2.	Silverio Garing	PDP–Laban
For Mayor
3.	Marc Red Mariñas	PRP
For Vice Mayor
1.	Eulogio Dioko II	PRP
For Councilor (1st District)
1.	Teng Andres	PRP
3.	Bigmack Arciaga	PRP
13.	Lisa Macalalad	PRP
15.	Marichu Pagkalinawan	PRP
17.	Mekong Sapitula	PRP
18.	Joshua Sebastian	PRP
19.	Melchor Teves	PRP
20.	Bong Venturina	PRP
For Councilor (2nd District)
7.	Princess Gonzaga	PRP
10.	Bhebot Lizardo	PRP
11.	Wilson Lopena	PRP
14.	Marlon Medina	PRP
15.	Allan Miranda	PRP
18.	Kitchie San Pedro	PRP
20.	Vec-Vec Ulanday	PRP
21.	Gonza Tabora Vasquez	Lakas

Reform PH - People's Party

Reform PH - People's Party Muntinlupa-1st District
#	Name	Party
For Councilor (1st District)
9.	Ian Dela Cruz	RP

Independent

Independent
#	Name	Party
For Mayor
1.	Nelson Benjamin	Independent
4.	Oscar Marmeto	Independent
For Councilor (1st District)
7.	Nelvin Cerillo	Independent
11.	Gervic Erum	Independent
12.	Shernan Roy Gaite	Independent
For Councilor (2nd District)
4.	Anthony Raymond De Leon	Independent
5.	Ravi Del Rosario	Independent
6.	Elmer Espeleta	Independent
8.	Bruno Gravador	Independent
12.	Edgar Allan Manalo	Independent

== Result ==
=== Mayor ===
Muntinlupa mayoralty election
Party	Candidate	Votes	%
1Munti	Ruffy Biazon	180,742	74.26%
PRP	Red Mariñas	60,434	24.83%
Independent	Nelson Benjamin	1,153	0.47%
Independent	Oscar Mamerto	1,069	0.44%
Total votes		243,398	100.00

=== Vice Mayor ===
Muntinlupa vice mayoralty election
Party	Candidate	Votes	%
1Munti	Artemio Simundac (Incumbent)	131,882	57.47%
PRP	Eulogio Dioko II	97,567	42.52%
Total votes		229,449	100.00
1Munti hold			

=== District Representative ===
2022 Philippine House of Representatives election in Muntinlupa
Party	Candidate	Votes	%
Liberal	Jaime Fresnedi	183,085	77.71%
PDP–Laban	Silverio Garing	52,530	22.29%
Total votes		235,615	100.00%
Liberal gain from PDP–Laban			

=== Councilor ===
==== Summary ====
Party or alliance		Votes	%	Seats
One Muntinlupa		1,270,095	75.76	16
Team Red Mariñas	People's Reform Party	312,129	18.62	0
Team Red Mariñas	Lakas-CMD	13,085	0.78	0
Team Red Mariñas	Total	325,214	19.40	0
Reform		8,319	0.50	0
Independent		72,793	4.34	0
Ex officio seats				2
Total		1,676,421	100.00	18

==== 1st District ====
Muntinlupa City Council Elections - 1st District
Party	Candidate	Votes	%
1Munti	Raul Corro (Incumbent)	117,497	46.55
1Munti	Alexson Diaz (Incumbent)	113,081	44.80
1Munti	Paty Katy Boncayao-Barreto (Incumbent)	109,816	43.51
1Munti	Rachel Arciaga	104,727	41.49
1Munti	Ivee Arciaga-Tadefa (Incumbent)	100,487	39.81
1Munti	Allan Rey Camilon (Incumbent)	97,556	38.65
1Munti	Jedi Presnedi	92,183	36.52
1Munti	Ting Niefes (Incumbent)	83,480	33.08
PRP	Melchor Gaspar Teves	57,424	22.75
PRP	Mekong Sapitula	41,774	16.55
PRP	Teng Andres	27,844	11.03
PRP	Bigmack Arciaga	26,066	10.33
PRP	Joshua Sebastian	17,432	6.91
PRP	Maricris Pagkalinawan	17,005	6.74
PRP	Lisa Macalalad	13,245	5.25
PRP	Kuya Bong Venturina	11,620	4.60
Reform	Ian Dela Cruz	8,319	3.30
Independent	Shernan Roy Gaite	7,597	3.01
Independent	Nelvin Cerillo	4,567	1.81
Independent	Gervin Erum	3,597	1.43
Total votes		1,055,317	100.00

Party	Votes	%	Seats
One Muntinlupa	818,827	77.59	8
People's Reform Party	212,410	20.13	0
Reform	8,319	0.79	0
Independent	15,761	1.49	0
Total	1,055,317	100.00	8

==== 2nd District ====
Muntinlupa City Council Elections - 2nd District
Party	Candidate	Votes	%
1Munti	Mark Lester Baes (Incumbent)	62,863	24.91
1Munti	Francis Ian "Ryan" Bagatsing (Incumbent)	60,072	23.80
1Munti	Luvi Constantino	59,048	23.39
1Munti	Mamerto "Jun" Sevilla Jr.	58,817	23.30
1Munti	Marissa Rongavilla (Incumbent)	57,769	22.89
1Munti	Arlene Hilapo (Incumbent)	52,309	20.72
1Munti	Cornelio Martinez	51,856	20.55
1Munti	Rodolfo "Dado" Moldez	48,534	19.23
Independent	Elmer Espeleta	27,644	10.95
PRP	Vec Ulanday	21,787	8.63
PRP	Allan Miranda	19,056	7.55
PRP	Incess Gonzaga	14,657	5.81
PRP	Kitchi San Pedro-Ladignon	14,007	5.55
Lakas	Gonza Vasquez	13,085	5.18
PRP	Wilson Lopena	12,291	4.87
PRP	Marlon Medina	11,839	4.69
Independent	Bruno Gravador	9,002	3.57
Independent	Anthony Raymond De Leon	8,400	3.33
Independent	Ravi Del Rosario	6,955	2.76
PRP	Bhebot Lizardo	6,082	2.41
Independent	Edgar Allan Manalo	5,031	1.99
Total votes		621,104	100.00

Party or alliance		Votes	%	Seats
One Muntinlupa		451,268	72.66	8
Team Red Mariñas	People's Reform Party	99,719	16.06	0
Team Red Mariñas	Lakas-CMD	13,085	2.11	0
Team Red Mariñas	Total	112,804	18.16	0
Independent		57,032	9.18	0
Total		621,104	100.00	8

== Opinion polling ==
Ruffy Biazon vs. Red Mariñas
Source of poll aggregation	Dates administered	Ruffy Biazon	Red Mariñas	Margin
RP-Mission and Development Foundation Inc. (RPMDinc)	November 16–24, 2021	62%	29%	Biazon +33
