= Cuenca Ancestral House =

- Bahay na Tisa
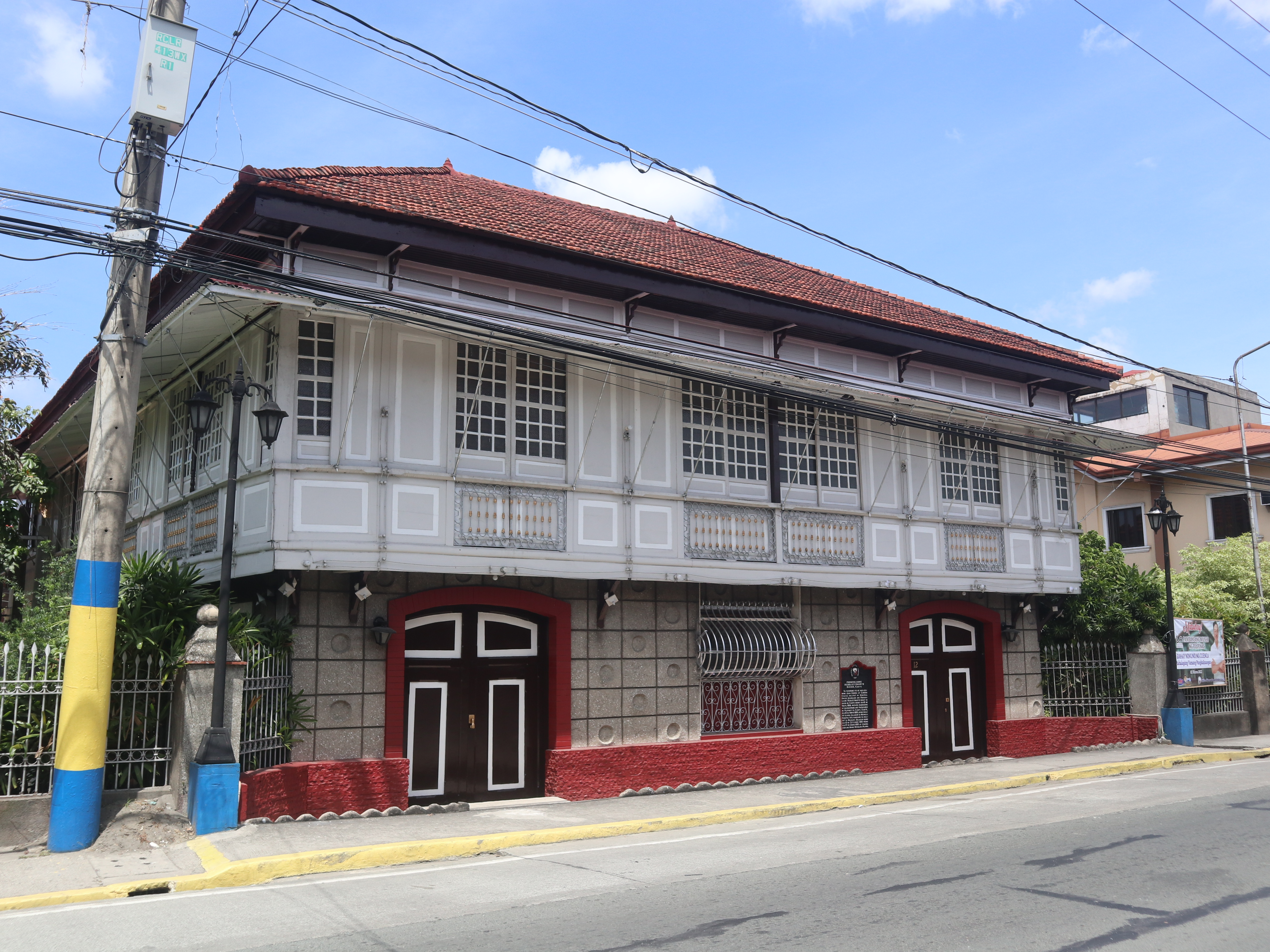
- Interactive map of the Cuenca Ancestral House area

General information
- Architectural style: Bahay na bato
- Location: Bacoor, Cavite, Philippines
- Coordinates: 14°27′34.82″N 120°56′34.04″E

The Cuenca Ancestral House (Bahay na Tisa) is a historic residential building in Bacoor, Cavite, Philippines.

== History ==
It served as the residence of Juan and Candida Cuenca. On July 15, 1898, the house became as the headquarters of the Katipunan-led revolutionary government of Emilio Aguinaldo during the Philippine Revolution shortly after the proclamation of Philippine Independence on June 12 of the same year. This earned it the reputation of being the "First Malacañang of the Philippines". It fulfilled this role until September 15, 1898, when the revolutionary government moved to Malolos.
