= E-Governance Act =

Congress of the Philippines
- Long title: An Act Institutionalizing the Transition of the Government to E‑Governance, Strengthening the ICT Academy, and Appropriating Funds Therefor
- Citation: Republic Act No. 12254
- Territorial extent: Philippines
- Enacted by: House of Representatives of the Philippines
- Enacted: 6 March 2023
- Enacted by: Senate of the Philippines
- Enacted: 27 January 2025
- Signed by: President Bongbong Marcos
- Signed: 5 September 2025
- Commenced: 9 April 2026
- Effective: 1 October 2025

Legislative history

Initiating chamber: House of Representatives of the Philippines
- Bill title: An Act Institutionalizing the Transition of the Government to E-Governance in the Digital Age, Creating for the Purpose the Philippine Infostructure Management Corporation and Appropriating Funds Therefor
- Bill citation: HB 7327
- Introduced: 30 June 2022
- First reading: 28 February 2023
- Second reading: 1 March 2023
- Third reading: 6 March 2023
- Voting summary: 304 voted for; 4 voted against; None abstained
- Committee report: Committee Report No. 349

Revising chamber: Senate of the Philippines
- Bill title: An Act Institutionalizing the Transition of the Government to E-Governance, Establishing for the Purpose the E-Governance Academy, and Appropriating Funds Therefor
- Bill citation: SB 2781
- Received from the House of Representatives of the Philippines: 7 July 2022
- First reading: 14 August 2024
- Second reading: 21 January 2025
- Third reading: 27 January 2025
- Voting summary: 21 voted for; None voted against; None abstained
- Committee report: Committee Report 297
- Conference committee bill passed by House of Representatives of the Philippines: 9 June 2025
- Conference committee bill passed by Senate of the Philippines: 9 June 2025
- Status: In force

The E-Governance Act, or the Act Institutionalizing the Transition of the Government to E‑Governance, Strengthening the ICT Academy, and Appropriating Funds Therefor, officially designated as Republic Act No. 12254 is a state process automation and digitization law in the Philippines. It establishes as state policy for the institutionalization of digital governance across the Philippine bureaucracy. The Act emphasizes efficiency, transparency, accountability, and citizen-centered service delivery, while requiring that open data and freedom of information be balanced with data privacy and security.

== Background ==
Prior to its passage of this law, government service delivery in the Philippines was characterized by fragmentation, redundancy, and inefficiency. Agencies often developed their own information systems in isolation, leading to incompatibility and duplication of effort. Citizens were required to submit the same documents repeatedly to different offices, and many transactions remained paper-based, requiring physical presence and long queues. This fragmentation also hindered transparency and accountability. Without interoperable systems, data sharing between agencies was slow and inconsistent, making it difficult to track government performance or detect irregularities. The lack of standardized digital platforms created opportunities for corruption, as manual processes left room for discretion and manipulation.

The trajectory of Philippine e‑governance can be traced through several distinct milestones, each reflecting the state’s evolving approach to digital transformation. The first official government web portal, Gov.ph, was launched in 2002. Its purpose was primarily informational, serving as a directory of agencies and services, but it did not allow citizens to complete transactions online. This limited scope meant that while it improved access to information, it did little to reduce the bureaucratic burden of in‑person processes.

A more ambitious effort came in 2012 with the iGovPhil Project, initiated under the Information and Communications Technology Office. This project sought to provide shared infrastructure for government agencies, including a government cloud, a unified email system, and the beginnings of a national government portal. While it laid important technical foundations, adoption was uneven. Agencies often pursued their own ICT projects independently, leading to duplication and incompatibility.

The creation of the Department of Information and Communications Technology in 2015 through Republic Act No. 10844 marked a turning point. For the first time, the Philippines had a dedicated agency to lead ICT and e‑governance initiatives. Soon after, in 2016, the department adopted the E‑Government Master Plan 2022, which articulated the vision of One Digitized Government, One Nation. This plan emphasized interoperability and citizen‑centered services, but implementation remained inconsistent, particularly among local government units with limited resources.

By the time of the COVID-19 pandemic, the weaknesses of these earlier initiatives became starkly visible. Citizens faced difficulties accessing essential services remotely, and the absence of a unified platform forced them to navigate multiple websites and systems, each with its own requirements. This context provided the immediate motivation for the eGov PH Super App, launched in 2023. Unlike its predecessors, the app was designed as a mobile-first, transactional platform that consolidated services from both national and local governments. It was also backed by stronger legal and institutional frameworks, particularly Republic Act No. 11032 (Ease of Doing Business and Efficient Government Service Delivery Act of 2018).

The successful rollout of this mobile application therefore motivated the need to institutionalize digital governance as a permanent feature of public administration. It sought to harmonize ICT projects across agencies, mandate interoperability, and create a unified framework for digital transformation. The law also emphasized citizen-centered services, transparency, and resilience against disruptions such as cyberattacks or public health emergencies.

== eGov PH Super App ==
eGov PH Super App is the Philippine government’s central digital platform designed to consolidate public services into a single, accessible mobile application. It was launched in June 2023 by the Department of Information and Communications Technology as part of the country’s broader digital transformation agenda, later reinforced by this law. The app was conceived to address persistent problems in Philippine governance, particularly the fragmentation of systems, the duplication of requirements, and the reliance on paper-based processes that forced citizens to visit multiple offices for even the most basic transactions.

The app functions as a one-stop shop for government services. It allows citizens to register and verify their identity using mobile numbers, personal information, and facial recognition, with further verification through government-issued identification such as the Philippine Identification System card, passports, or driver’s licenses. Once registered, users can access a wide range of services, including the application or renewal of clearances, access to civil registry documents, SIM card registration, eTravel passes, and digital versions of government-issued IDs. It also integrates digital payment systems, enabling citizens to pay fees and taxes electronically. Over time, the app has expanded to include services such as employment search, scheduling appointments for civil registry services, reporting crimes, and requesting financial or medical assistance from agencies like the Department of Health and the Department of Social Welfare and Development.

The eGov PH Super App is also designed with inclusivity in mind. Certain features, such as storing and displaying the national ID, can be accessed offline, ensuring that citizens without constant internet access can still benefit. The app requires agencies and local government units to integrate their services into interoperable platforms, ensuring that the app is not merely a convenience tool but a legal requirement for harmonized digital governance. It also minimizes opportunities for corruption by reducing face-to-face interactions and discretionary handling of documents.

In December 2025, the Philippine government launched the eGovPH super app. The application, unveiled by President Ferdinand “Bongbong” Marcos Jr., centralizes services such as permits, clearances, and government information in a single interface to improve accessibility and efficiency in government transactions. The initiative aligns with the objectives of the E‑Governance Act, which calls for the adoption of information and communications technology to modernize public service delivery.

== Legislative history ==
=== House ===
Several legislative bills were proposed by the House. These included House Bills Nos. 3, 277, 1809, 2568, 2683, 2731, 2902, 2963, 2978, 3421, 3563, 3612, 4115, 4137, 4261, 4262, 4499, 4776, 5308, 6882, and 7056. Each of these earlier bills carried variations of the same theme: institutionalizing the transition of government to e‑governance, establishing an e‑government framework, or mandating the digitalization of frontline services.

The first measure was House Bill No. 3, filed on 30 June 2022 by Ferdinand Martin Romualdez, Yedda Marie Kittilstvedt Romualdez, Ferdinand Alexander Araneta Marcos, and Jude Acidre. This bill set the tone for the 19th Congress by identifying e‑governance as a priority reform.

Shortly after, House Bill No. 277 was filed on 4 July 2022 by Tobias Reynald Tiangco, followed on 2 August 2022, House Bill No. 1809 was filed by Jose Francisco Benjamin Benitez, followed on 10 August 2022 by House Bill No. 2568 authored by Rufus Rodriguez. The sequence continued with House Bill No. 2683, filed on 11 August 2022 by Cheeno Miguel Brizuela Almario, and House Bill No. 2731, filed on 15 August 2022 by Zaldy Co.

On 17 August 2022, House Bill No. 2902 was filed by Ralph Recto, followed on 22 August 2022 by House Bill No. 2963 authored by Joey Salceda and House Bill No. 2978 authored by Estrellita Suansing and Horacio Suansing Jr. The next wave came in September 2022. On 12 September, House Bill No. 3421 was filed by Ernest George Tambunting. On 19 September, House Bill No. 3563 was filed by Rex Gatchalian, and on 20 September, House Bill No. 3612 was filed by Mark Go. In October 2022, House Bill No. 4115 was filed on 10 October by Strike Bautista Revilla, followed on 11 October by House Bill No. 4137 authored by LRay Villafuerte. On 17 October, two measures were filed: House Bill No. 4261 by David Suarez and House Bill No. 4262 by Danilo Suarez. On 26 October, House Bill No. 4499 was filed by Joseph Stephen Paduano. In November 2022, House Bill No. 4776 was filed on 7 November by Erwin Tulfo, and House Bill No. 5308 was filed on 28 November by Aurelio Gonzales Jr.

The final set of measures came in early 2023. On 14 February 2023, House Bill No. 6882 was filed by Benny Abante, and on 21 February 2023, House Bill No. 7056 was filed by Wilbert Lee.

All of these measures were referred to the Committee on Information and Communications Technology, with the Committee on Appropriations as secondary committee. On 28 February 2023, the committees reported out House Bill No. 7327 under Committee Report No. 349, entitled An Act Institutionalizing the Transition of the Government to E‑Governance in the Digital Age, Creating for the Purpose the Philippine Infostructure Management Corporation and Appropriating Funds Therefor. The bill was swiftly approved on second reading on 1 March 2023 and third reading on 6 March 2023 with 304 in favor, 4 against and no abstentions.

=== Senate ===
The push for an institutionalized framework on e‑governance in the Senate began with multiple bills filed by different senators between July 2022 and early 2023. These measures varied in scope—from proposals to establish a national e‑government authority, to bills mandating full digital transformation of agencies, to those focusing on specific aspects such as mobile applications, digital payments, or local government ICT offices. The earliest of these was Senate Bill No. 67, filed by Senator Alan Peter Cayetano, which proposed the institutionalization of a Mobile Application Para sa Pilipino (Mobile A.P.P.) as a platform for delivering government services. This was followed by Senate Bill No. 194, filed by Senator Bong Go, which directly called for the transition of the government to e‑governance in the digital age.

In the succeeding months, other senators filed their own versions. Senator Alan Peter Cayetano also filed Senate Bill No. 298, the Smart Philippines Act, which emphasized affordable internet access as part of digital transformation. Senate President Juan Miguel Zubiri filed Senate Bill No. 318, another version of the E‑Governance Act. Senator Grace Poe filed Senate Bill No. 334, establishing an e‑government framework, while Senator Jinggoy Estrada filed Senate Bill No. 455 with similar intent.

More senators joined the effort. Senator Sonny Angara filed Senate Bill No. 625, proposing a National Digital Transformation Policy and Council, while Senator Sherwin Gatchalian filed Senate Bill No. 685, mandating the full digital transformation of all government agencies and local government units. Senator Lito Lapid filed Senate Bill No. 974, focusing on the digitalization of frontline services, and Senator Ramon Bong Revilla Jr. filed Senate Bill No. 982, another e‑government framework bill.

In late 2022, Senator Sherwin Gatchalian filed Senate Bill No. 1051, proposing the establishment of an Information Technology Office in every province, city, and municipality. Senator Mark Villar filed Senate Bill No. 1126, mandating the transition to e‑governance. Senator JV Ejercito filed Senate Bill No. 1172, institutionalizing a master plan for e‑governance.

By early 2023, additional measures were filed: Senator Ramon Bong Revilla Jr. filed Senate Bill No. 1542, Senator Joel Villanueva filed Senate Bill No. 1574, and Senator Loren Legarda filed Senate Bill No. 1867, all of which reiterated the need for a comprehensive e‑governance law. Finally, Senator Sonny Angara filed Senate Bill No. 1978, another version institutionalizing the transition to e‑governance.

All of these measures—Senate Bills Nos. 67, 194, 298, 318, 334, 455, 625, 685, 974, 982, 1051, 1126, 1172, 1542, 1574, 1867, and 1978—were referred to the Senate Committees on Science and Technology; Civil Service, Government Reorganization and Professional Regulation; Local Government; Public Information and Mass Media; and Finance. On 14 August 2024, these committees jointly reported out Senate Bill No. 2781 under Committee Report No. 297, recommending its approval in substitution of all the earlier bills and taking into consideration House Bill No. 7327, which had already been approved by the House of Representatives. Senate Bill No. 2781 was entitled An Act Institutionalizing the Transition of the Government to E‑Governance, Establishing for the Purpose the E‑Governance Academy, and Appropriating Funds Therefor.

On 11 September 2024, Senate Bill No. 2781 was formally sponsored in plenary session. The bill then proceeded through the period of interpellations and amendments during the latter part of 2024. On 21 January 2025, the Senate approved the bill on Second Reading.

On 27 January 2025, the Third Reading copy of Senate Bill No. 2781 was finalized, with 21 senators in favor, no one is against, while two did not vote. Sonny Angara was already resigned to take the role of Secretary of the Department of Education.

=== Bicameral ===
On 3 February 2025, the Senate formally designated its conferees to the bicameral conference committee. The chamber named Senator Alan Peter Cayetano, Senator Lito Lapid, and Senator Aquilino Pimentel III to represent the Senate in reconciling the differing provisions of the two measures. On 4 February 2025, the House of Representatives likewise designated its conferees, following a decision made by the Senate. The House panel included Representative Tobias Reynald Tiangco of the Lone District of Navotas City, Representative Cheeno Miguel Almario of the Second District of Davao Oriental, Representative Maricar Zamora Nograles‑Almario of the First District of Davao de Oro, Representative Joel Cabredo of the Third District of Albay, and Representative Richard Ongchuan of the Lone District of Northern Samar.

After months of technical working sessions and negotiations, the bicameral conference committee completed its work. On 9 June 2025, the Conference Committee Report on the disagreeing provisions of House Bill No. 7327 and Senate Bill No. 2781 was submitted to the Senate. The report recommended that House Bill No. 7327, in consolidation with Senate Bill No. 2781, be approved in accordance with the reconciled text agreed upon by the conferees. On the same day, Senator Alan Peter Cayetano delivered the sponsorship speech for the conference committee report in the Senate plenary. Later that day, the Senate approved the report. The House of Representatives likewise approved the conference committee report the same day.

=== Approval of the President ===
President Bongbong Marcos approved the measure on September 5, 2025.

== Implementation ==
The Department of Information and Communications Technology submitted the Implementing Rules and Regulations (IRR) on February 13, 2026. DICT signed the IRR on March 24, 2026, and it took effect in 15 days on April 9, 2026.

=== DICT ===
The Department of Information and Communications Technology is designated as the lead implementing agency. It is tasked with harmonizing information and communications technology projects with the National Information and Communications Technology Development Agenda and the Electronic Government Master Plan, ensuring interoperability, supporting infrastructure and cybersecurity, and issuing performance scorecards.

=== EGov UPMO ===
The Act establishes the Electronic Governance Unified Project Management Office (EGov UPMO) within the Department. Headed by the Undersecretary for Electronic Government, the EGov UPMO is mandated to oversee the portfolio, program, and project management of government ICT initiatives. It ensures alignment with the Electronic Government Master Plan, monitors timelines and budgets, enforces interoperability standards, and evaluates agency proposals. The Office is required to employ professionals with internationally recognized certifications in project and program management, thereby institutionalizing professional standards in government ICT implementation.

=== ICT Academy ===
The Information and Communications Technology Academy is strengthened as a permanent institution for capacity-building. It is mandated to provide training and certification in project management, program management, information technology service management, enterprise architecture, information security, data privacy, and risk management. The Academy is intended to ensure a sustainable supply of qualified ICT professionals within the bureaucracy, thereby professionalizing ICT positions and reducing reliance on external contractors.

=== Electronic Government Master Plan ===
The Electronic Government Master Plan (EGMP) is institutionalized as the national blueprint for digital transformation. It must be reviewed every three years and aligned with the Philippine Development Plan. The EGMP provides the overarching architecture for digitization, integration, and delivery of government services. It requires a whole-of-government approach, obligating agencies, local government units, and government-owned and controlled corporations to align their ICT projects with the Plan. The Department of Information and Communications Technology is mandated to formulate and update the EGMP in consultation with stakeholders, including civil society and the private sector. The Plan encompasses both citizen-facing services and internal systems such as finance, human resources, procurement, and records management. It also requires privacy and cybersecurity safeguards. Systems processing personal data must undergo a Privacy Impact Assessment under the guidelines of the National Privacy Commission, and minimum information security standards must be prescribed in accordance with international best practices.

== Coverage ==
This Act applies to all branches of the Government of the Republic of the Philippines, including the Executive, Legislative, and Judicial branches, Local Government Units, State Universities and Colleges, Government-Owned and Controlled Corporations, and Philippine Government offices abroad. It provides definitions of key terms such as electronic governance, electronic government, interoperability, digitalization, critical information infrastructure, privacy-by-design, privacy-by-default, and privacy engineering. These definitions establish the conceptual and technical framework for implementation.

== Role of Government agencies, offices, and instrumentalities ==
All government agencies, offices, and instrumentalities—including constitutional commissions, local government units, state universities and colleges, and government-owned and controlled corporations—are mandated to adopt and implement electronic governance systems consistent with the Electronic Government Master Plan. Each agency must designate a Chief Information Officer or equivalent officer to ensure alignment with the Plan. Agencies are required to digitize frontline services, enhance websites, and establish electronic bulletin boards for information dissemination. They must also ensure interoperability with the Integrated Government Network and other national platforms. The Act respects the fiscal and administrative autonomy of agencies while requiring compliance with national standards.

== Core electronic government programs and systems ==
The Act mandates the development of integrated systems forming the backbone of Philippine electronic governance. These include the Citizen Frontline Delivery Service Platform, the Electronic Local Government Unit System, Government Digital Payment Systems, the Government Public Key Infrastructure, the Human Capital Management Information System, the Integrated Financial Management Information System, the Integrated Government Network, the Online Public Service Portal, the Philippine Digital Health System, the Philippine Government Interoperability Framework, a modernized Government Procurement System, and the Records and Knowledge Management Information System. All systems processing personal data also must undergo a Privacy Impact Assessment in accordance with the Data Privacy Act of 2012 (Republic Act No. 10173) and the guidelines of the National Privacy Commission.

== E-Government Interoperability Fund ==
The Act creates the E-Government Interoperability Fund (EIF), administered by the Department of Information and Communications Technology. The Fund finances the development, integration, and maintenance of interoperable systems. It may be sourced from appropriations under the General Appropriations Act, agency savings, and other lawful sources. The EIF is designed to support agencies and local government units with limited resources, thereby promoting uniformity and preventing disparities in digital capacity.

== Transitory provision ==
The Act provides for a transition from paper-based and fragmented systems to integrated digital governance. Within one year of effectivity, the Department of Information and Communications Technology must establish the Electronic Governance Unified Project Management Office. Agencies and local government units are required to adopt the mandated systems or integrate their existing platforms into the national framework, provided these are interoperable. This provision ensures continuity of services while standardizing systems.

== Joint Congressional Oversight Committee on E-Governance ==
The Act establishes a Joint Congressional Oversight Committee on E-Governance, composed of members of both the Senate and the House of Representatives. The Committee is tasked with monitoring and evaluating implementation, particularly the progress of the Electronic Government Master Plan, the utilization of the E-Government Interoperability Fund, and the performance of the Department of Information and Communications Technology. It is authorized to call agencies to report on compliance and to recommend adjustments or amendments.

== Significance for the Philippines and its bureaucracy ==
Republic Act No. 12254 represents a structural reform in Philippine public administration. It institutionalizes digital governance as a permanent feature of the bureaucracy, addressing inefficiencies such as redundant paperwork, fragmented systems, and slow service delivery.

In policy terms, the Act aims to embed digital transformation into law, rather than treating it as an executive initiative. It is designed to improve bureaucratic efficiency, reduce opportunities for corruption by minimizing face-to-face transactions, and enhance public trust through more transparent and accessible services. For the Philippines, it aims to transition toward a bureaucracy that is more integrated, professionalized, and capable of meeting the demands of a digital society.
