= Anakalusugan =

Political organization in the Philippines

- — Philippine partylist —
- Full name: Alagaan Natin Ating Kalusugan
- Sector(s) represented: Health
- Colors: Yellow, Green, Red

Current representation (19th Congress)
- Seats in the House of Representatives: 0 / 3 (Out of 63 party-list seats)
- Representative(s): None (Position last held by Ray T. Reyes)

Website
- anakalusugan.com.ph

Alagaan Natin Ating Kalusugan (lit. 'let's take care of our health'), also known as the Anakalusugan Party List (stylized as AnaKalusugan, a portmanteau of Tagalog words for "offspring" and "health") is a health advocacy group with representation in the House of Representatives of the Philippines. It aims to represent the Philippines' health sector.

== History ==
=== 18th Congress ===
During the 18th Congress, Anakalusugan had Mike Defensor as its representative. Defensor proposed the passage of Free Annual Medical Checkup Act that would mandate the government to provide free annual medical examinations to Filipinos. Anakalusugan also played a part in the House of Representatives' probe against Philhealth regarding a corruption scandal involving funds worth billions of pesos in 2020.

Amid the COVID-19 pandemic, Defensor along with Sagip Party-list representative Rodante Marcoleta initiated an event called "ivermectin pan-three" that distributes the anti-parasitic drug ivermectin, despite warnings from the World Health Organization on the lack of evidence to support ivermectin's efficacy against COVID-19.

== Electoral performance ==
Election	Votes	%	Party-list seats
2010	47,828	0.16%	0 / 57
2013	Did not participate		
2016	191,362	0.59%	0 / 59
2019	237,629	0.85%	1 / 61
2022	281,512	0.76%	1 / 63
2025	154,121	0.37%	0 / 63

=== Representatives to Congress ===
Period	Representative
18th Congress; 2019–2022	Mike Defensor
19th Congress; 2022–2025	Ray T. Reyes
Note: A party-list group, can win a maximum of three seats in the House of Representatives.
