= 2022 Lapu-Lapu City local elections =

Election in Lapu-Lapu City, Philippines in 2022

2022 Lapu-Lapu City mayoral election
- May 9, 2022
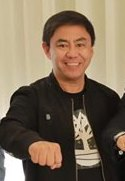
		LAKAS
Nominee	Junard Chan	Paz Radaza
Party	PDP–Laban	Lakas
Running mate	Celedonio Sitoy	Ricardo Amores
Popular vote	148,629	45,634
Percentage	76.51%	23.49%
Mayor before election
Junard Chan
PDP–Laban
Elected mayor
Junard Chan
PDP–Laban

Local elections were held in Lapu-Lapu City on May 9, 2022, within the Philippine general election. Registered voters of the city will be electing candidates for the following elective local posts: mayor, vice mayor, district representative, and twelve councilors. The city has its own congressional district.

== Mayoralty and vice mayoralty elections ==
=== Mayor ===
Incumbent mayor Junard Chan is vying for a second term. He is running against incumbent representative and former mayor Paz Radaza.

Mandaue City mayoral election
Party	Candidate	Votes	%
PDP–Laban	Junard Chan	148,629	76.51
Lakas	Paz Radaza	45,634	23.49
Total votes		194,263	100.00
Margin of victory		102,995	53.02

=== Vice mayor ===
Incumbent vice mayor Celedonio Sitoy is vying for a second term. He is running against incumbent city councilor Ricardo Amores. Also running is Reynaldo Canton Jr.

Mandaue City Vice mayoral election
Party	Candidate	Votes	%
PDP–Laban	Celedonio Sitoy	125,417	70.48
Lakas	Ricardo Amores	47,493	26.69
PDDS	Reynaldo Canton Jr.	5,037	2.83
Total votes		177,947	100.00
Margin of victory		77,924	44.19

== District representative ==
Incumbent representative Paz Radaza is vying to return as mayor thereby making the lone district an open seat. Six candidates will compete for the seat including incumbent city councilor Michael Dignos and Maria Cynthia King-Chan, wife of incumbent mayor Junard Chan.

2022 Philippine House of Representatives election in Lapu-Lapu City's Lone District
Party	Candidate	Votes	%
PDP–Laban	Maria Cynthia King-Chan	136,713	74.31
Lakas	Michael Dignos	35,699	19.40
PDDS	Manuel Degollacion Jr.	6,393	3.47
Liberal	Chezie Demegillo	3,007	1.63
Independent	Genaro Tampus	1,451	0.79
PLM	Pablo Doronio Jr.	724	0.39
Total votes		183,987	100.00
Margin of victory		101,014	54.91

== City Council ==
Incumbents are expressed in italics.

=== By ticket ===
==== Partido Demokratiko Pilipino-Lakas ng Bayan/Team Libre ====
#	Name	Party
1.	Marciano Alforque Jr.	PDP–Laban
4.	Celestino Aying	PDP–Laban
5.	Linda Susan Baring	PDP–Laban
9.	Annabeth Cuizon	PDP–Laban
10.	Jan Vincent Dela Serna	PDP–Laban
12.	Eugenio Espedido	PDP–Laban
13.	Jeorgen Book	PDP–Laban
15.	Emilio Galaroza Jr.	PDP–Laban
18.	Efren Herrera	PDP–Laban
25.	Joseph Pangatungan	PDP–Laban
34.	Climaco Tatoy Jr.	PDP–Laban
35.	Nelson Yap	PDP–Laban

==== Lakas–CMD/Team Deretso ====
#	Name	Party
3.	Antonio Amistad	Lakas
7.	Elias Berdin	Lakas
13.	Cipriano Flores	Lakas
16.	Alexander Gestopa Jr.	Lakas
17.	Diosaminda Hayashi	Lakas
19.	Flaviano Hiyas Jr.	Lakas
22.	Rex Mangubat	Lakas
26.	Gregorio Paquibot Jr.	Lakas
27.	Eduardo Patalinjug	Lakas
28.	Arsilito Pejo	Lakas
29.	Rodolfo Potot	Lakas
31.	Harry Don Radaza	Lakas

==== Pederalismo ng Dugong Dakilang Samahan ====
#	Name	Party
6.	Marife Batobalonos	PDDS
8.	Chelito Caro	PDDS
20.	Fredie Into	PDDS
21.	Oliver Linao	PDDS
24.	Arturo Morala	PDDS
32.	Jose Ramero Roma	PDDS

==== Partido Lakas ng Masa ====
#	Name	Party
2.	Engely Alibong	PLM
30.	Gemma Rabanzo	PLM

==== Independent ====
#	Name	Party
11.	Humprey Elvira	Independent
33.	Guido Tabaña	Independent

=== By district ===
Party	Votes	%	Seats
Partido Demokratiko Pilipino-Lakas ng Bayan	1,383,711	71.98	12
Lakas–CMD	488,515	25.41	–
Pederalismo ng Dugong Dakilang Samahan	34,936	1.82	–
Partido Lakas ng Masa	2,891	0.15	–
Independent	12,180	0.63	–
Ex officio seats			2
Total	1,922,233	100.00	14

- Key: Italicized: incumbent

City Council election at Lapu-Lapu City's lone district
Party	Candidate	Votes	%
PDP–Laban	Eugenio Espedido	125,370	62.48
PDP–Laban	Annabeth Cuizon	121,784	60.70
PDP–Laban	Marciano Alforque Jr.	120,667	60.14
PDP–Laban	Celestino Aying	120,066	59.84
PDP–Laban	Linda Susan Baring	119,548	59.58
PDP–Laban	Jan Vincent Dela Serna	119,424	59.52
PDP–Laban	Efren Herrera	116,656	58.14
PDP–Laban	Nelson Yap	116,478	58.05
PDP–Laban	Climaco Tatoy Jr.	106,593	53.13
PDP–Laban	Jeorgen Book	105,793	52.73
PDP–Laban	Joseph Pangatungan	105,714	52.69
PDP–Laban	Emilio Galaroza Jr.	105,618	52.64
Lakas	Rex Mangubat	49,940	24.89
Lakas	Antonio Amistad	44,641	22.25
Lakas	Flaviano Hiyas Jr.	43,471	21.67
Lakas	Diosaminda Hayashi	42,384	21.12
Lakas	Elias Berdin	42,034	20.95
Lakas	Eduardo Patalinjug	41,049	20.46
Lakas	Harry Don Radaza	40,529	20.20
Lakas	Rodolfo Potot	39,172	19.52
Lakas	Alexander Gestopa Jr.	38,916	19.40
Lakas	Cipriano Flores	38,744	19.31
Lakas	Gregorio Paquibot Jr.	37,374	18.63
Lakas	Arsilito Pejo	30,261	15.08
PDDS	Fredie Inot	8,735	4.35
Independent	Humprey Elvira	8,175	4.07
PDDS	Chelito Caro	7,886	3.93
PDDS	Marife Batobalonos	5,598	2.79
PDDS	Oliver Linao	5,025	2.50
Independent	Guido Tabaña	4,005	2.00
PDDS	Arturo Morala	3,974	1.98
PDDS	Jose Ramero Roma	3,718	1.85
PLM	Gemma Rabanzo	2,891	1.44
Total votes		1,922,233	100.00

Party	Votes	%	Seats
Partido Demokratiko Pilipino-Lakas ng Bayan/Team Libre	1,383,711	71.98	12
Lakas–CMD/Team Deretso	488,515	25.41	0
Pederalismo ng Dugong Dakilang Samahan	34,936	1.82	0
Independent	12,180	0.63	0
Partido Lakas ng Masa	2,891	0.15	0
Total	1,922,233	100.00	12
