= New Agrarian Emancipation Act =

Congress of the Philippines
- Long title: An Act Emancipating Agrarian Reform Beneficiaries from financial burden by condoning all principal loans, unpaid amortizations and interests and exempting payment of Estate Tax on agricultural lands awarded under the Comprehensive Agrarian Reform Program
- Citation: Republic Act No. 11953
- Territorial extent: Philippines
- Enacted by: House of Representatives of the Philippines
- Enacted by: Senate of the Philippines
- Signed by: President Bongbong Marcos
- Signed: July 7, 2023
- Effective: July 24, 2023
- Status: In force

The New Agrarian Emancipation Act, officially designated as Republic Act No. 11953, is a bill passed by the 19th Congress of the Philippines and signed by President Bongbong Marcos on July 7, 2023. The law frees more than 600,000 farmers from debt. The Act complements the Aquino-era Comprehensive Agrarian Reform Program, which condones farmers with awarded lands from amortizations (managed by Land Bank of the Philippines), including interest and surcharges. About 610,054 agrarian reform beneficiaries (ARBs) tilling 1,173,101.575 hectares (2,898,797.12 acres) of land are seen to benefit from this law. The Philippine government will pay the remaining balance of the direct compensation due the landowners under the Voluntary Land Transfer (VLT) or the Direct Payment Scheme (DPS) amounting to ₱206.2 million. The law covers ₱57.56 billion in agrarian arrears.

Among the law's authors were party-list representatives from the Makabayan Bloc: House Minority Leader France Castro of ACT Teachers, House Assistant Minority Leader Arlene Brosas of Gabriela, and Raoul Manuel of Kabataan. It was passed in the House of Representatives and the Senate on March 22, 2023.

The first-ever distribution of Certificates of Condonation with Release of Mortgage (COCROM) was held in Lingayen, Pangasinan, on July 19, 2024, almost one year after the condonation law took effect.

== See also ==
- Land reform in the Philippines
  - Comprehensive Agrarian Reform Program
