= Muntinlupa National High School =

- Mataas na Paaralang Pambansa ng Muntinlupa

Location
- NBP Res., Poblacion; Muntinlupa, Metro Manila; Philippines; 14.3887854°N 121.0272990°E

Information
- Type: Public
- Established: August 3, 1945 (as Muntinlupa High School)
- Founder: Bureau of Prisons Director Eriberto Misa
- Principal: Dr. Rosendo E. Sangalang
- Grades: 7 to 12
- Newspaper: Umalohokan (Filipino) and Chanticleer (English)

Muntinlupa National High School (Filipino: Mataas na Paaralang Pambansa ng Muntinlupa) or simply MNHS is a public school in Muntinlupa, Philippines. Located in NBP Reservation, Poblacion, Muntinlupa, it was established on August 3, 1945 and is currently headed by Dr. Rosendo E. Sangalang.

== History ==
On July 17, 1945, due to the need of providing accessible high school education to the children of the Bureau of Prisons employees, Prisons Director Eriberto Misa, together with New Bilibid Prisons Superintendent Alfredo Bunye petitioned the Secretary of Public Instruction and Information for the opening of a public high school within the premises of the NBP Reservation. At that time, the children of prison employees either sent their children to the nearest high schools located in Manila or in Biñan. In the same petition, the prison officials guaranteed that the BUPRI administration would provide the facilities needed by the proposed high school. A week later, they sent another letter suggesting that a monthly tuition fee of 10 pesos should be charged to every student. The Department of Public Instruction and Information, then led by Secretary Jose Reyes, approved the proposal.

Upon the approval of the request of the BUPRI Officials, Superintendent Vicente Garcia of the Division of Rizal received instructions to organize the school, named as Muntinlupa High School. He appointed Cesar S. Tiangco, a Navotas-born teacher of Rizal High School as the school's first principal. Lourdes Tibayan and Catalina Roque joined Tiangco as faculty members. Later, they were joined by Teodora Sacco, Melchor Tugab, Pilar Francisco and Miss Clarito. On their part, the BUPRI officials created a school board, with BUPRI Executive Officer Generoso Castañeda as Chair and BUPRI Education Section Chief Rufino Recaido and NBP Superintendent Bunye as members. They likewise assigned a portion of the BUPRI's Construction Section Building located in NBP Reservation's Type B area as the MHS campus, consisting of two classrooms, one laboratory, a home economics room, and a windowless building dubbed as "carcel" (solitary confinement cell) as classroom for fourth-year students. A small patch of land across the road served as the school's horticulture garden, and the Muntinlupa Sunken Garden acted as the school's parade ground.

The first class of Muntinlupa High School opened on August 3, 1945, with 41 students from various families of NBP employees. Four years later, this pioneering class had graduated, with BUPRI Director Eustaquio Balagtas giving the commencement speech. As the years went by, other children from the neighboring barrios of Muntinlupa were admitted to the school, increasing further the student population. In 1955, after four years of negotiations between the Department of Justice and Department of Education, and preparations by BUPRI officials first led by Director Balagtas and later, his successor, Atty. Alfredo Bunye, the MHS campus was relocated to a 10.5 hectare land on the northern part of the NBP Reservation. The school buildings in the new site were constructed by BUPRI inmates, with its funding derived from the congressional funds of Rizal First District Representative Eulogio Rodriguez Jr. It served as the sole public high school in Muntinlupa until the establishment of the Muntinlupa Municipal High School in 1980.

After 31 years in service, in 1976, Tiangco returned to Rizal High School to serve as their School Principal. He was then replaced by Marcela Ponce, on whose leadership the school was upgraded to its present status as a national high school following the approval of the Ministries of Budget and Education and Culture. Two years after, the school's main building was razed in a fire, prompting the government to replace it with a larger, two-storey Imelda-type building. In 1994, the school started to offer the DOST's Engineering and Science Education Program, with students being admitted after a competitive examinations and their curriculum having electives in science and mathematics. In the same decade, the campus' land area was decreased due to the construction of the Katarungan Village, a housing project for the employees of the Department of Justice and its line agencies.

Due to its large student population, MNHS annexes were established in the late 1990s. In 1998, the Muntinlupa National High School - Science Annex was established and selected MNHS faculty was tapped to serve as its initial administrators and teachers. It was initially located inside the nearby Itaas Elementary School compound before it was relocated in Barangay Tunasan and became the Muntinlupa Science High School. In 2009, the Muntinlupa National High School - Annex (now Poblacion National High School) was established in Poblacion, Muntinlupa to cater to the residents of the Southville III Housing Project. Two years later, the MNHS - Tunasan Annex was established and in 2021, it became a separate school known as the Tunasan National High School. In these cases, some of MNHS faculty members and administrators were seconded to these annexes until such time that the school itself had sufficient faculty members.

In 2019, MNHS won the Zayed Sustainability Prize for Global High School Category, beating more than 2,000 proposals from different schools around the world. The winning proposal, "RevAMP: Revitalized Algae Micro-farm Projects", was conceptualized by students Maria Eliza May Faldas, Miguel Bautista, and Diego de Vera, under the guidance of MNHS Science Department Head Teacher III Ma. Regaele Olarte and faculty member Jason Albaro.

== Roster of school principals ==
Name	Tenure	Notes	Post-MNHS career
Cesar S. Tiangco	1945-1976	First school principal	Returned to Rizal High School, Pasig as principal
Marcela B. Ponce	1978-1991	Former MNHS English teacher	Retired
Felix A. Balbaguio	1991-1995	Former MNHS CAT-I commandant, transferred from Pasay City West High School	Transferred to Makati High School, Makati
Dr. Isabelita L. Montesa	1996-2006	Transferred from Makati High School	Retired
Dr. Estrella C. Aseron	2006-2014	Transferred from Parañaque National High School	Transferred to Pedro E. Diaz High School, where she first served as principal
Dr. Florante C. Marmeto	2014-2019	Former MNHS Mathematics teacher and former principal of Alabang and Sucat Elementary Schools	Transferred to PEDHS
Dr. Antonio B. Rocha	2019-2024	Former MNHS Values Education teacher, transferred from Tunasan National High School	Transferred to PEDHS
Dr. Florante C. Marmeto	2024-2025	Former MNHS principal, transferred from Muntinlupa Science High School	Appointed Chief of Curriculum Implementation Division, DepEd SDO Muntinlupa
Dr. Rosendo E. Sangalang	2025–present	Former MNHS TLE department head, first principal of Poblacion National High School, transferred from Lakeview Integrated School	Incumbent

== Jurisdictional history ==
Division	Year	Notes
Division of Rizal	1945-1975	Together with other municipalities of the pre-1975 Rizal Province
Division of Pasay City	1975-1993	Together with Pasay City and then-Municipalities of Makati, Parañaque, Las Piñas, Taguig, and Pateros, dubbed as NCR 4th District
Division of Muntinlupa, Taguig, and Pateros (MUNTAPAT)	1993-1996	Present-Day DepEd SDO Taguig City and Pateros
Division of Muntinlupa	1996–present	Incumbent

== System ==
The Muntinlupa National High School curriculum for Junior High School:

- STE (formerly ESEP) caters to students with future professions in Science, Technology and Engineering. Students in this curriculum undergo a series of screening activities including an exam and interview.
- Regular curriculum follows the basic system of Philippine education.

Muntinlupa National High School Tracks for Senior High School:

Academic Track

- Accountancy, Business and Management Strand is for students with ambitions in the field of business and finance
- General Academic Strand which is for those who will pursue basic professions including education and criminology, and for undecided students
- Science, Technology, Engineering and Mathematics Strand is for the students who aspire to be involved in the fields of Science and Math

Arts and Design and Sports Track

Technological Vocational Livelihood Track

- Home Economics
- Information and Communications Technology

Strengthened Senior High School (SHS) Program

- Starting school year 2025–2026, Muntinlupa National High School was designated as one of four pilot institutions in Muntinlupa for the strengthened Senior High School (SHS) program under DepEd. Under the program, core subjects are reduced from 15 per semester to five full-year subjects offered in Grade 11, namely Effective Communication, Life Skills, General Mathematics, General Science, and Pag-aaral ng Kasaysayan at Lipunang Pilipino. The program also restructured tracks into two — Academic and TechPro — and expanded work immersion hours from 80 to 320–640 hours.

Former heads of the Senior High School are Dr. Darylle Cesar G. Hilapo (STEM) from 2016 to 2022 and Dr. Mylyn M. Vallejo (HUMSS) from 2022 to 2025. The senior high school is currently headed by Nelia Abejar from 2025 to present.

== International awards ==
- Global High School (GHS) category for the East & Asia Pacific of the 2019 Zayed Sustainability Prize (ZSP).

== Notable alumni ==
Alumni	Year graduated	Notes
Eufronia Recaido	1949	Class valedictorian; consul-general of various diplomatic missions of the Department of Foreign Affairs
Ignacio Bunye	1960	Class valedictorian, later mayor (1986-1998) and congressman (1998-2001) of Muntinlupa City, press secretary, and member of the Bangko Sentral ng Pilipinas Monetary Board
Jesus Verzosa	1971	Class valedictorian, later chief of the Philippine National Police (2008-2010)
Roberto Rongavilla	1973	Class salutatorian; former district director of the Manila Police District
Rey Bulay	1975	Former Muntinlupa city councilor (1988-1998, 2007-2010), PCGG commissioner, Manila chief prosecutor and COMELEC commissioner
Francisco Dakila Jr.	1977	Class valedictorian; former deputy governor, Bangko Sentral ng Pilipinas
Joseph Acosta	1977	Former AFP surgeon general
Emmanuel Salamat	1981	Former commander, AFP Northern Luzon Command
Rowena Raton-Hibanada	1990	2008 Metrobank Most Outstanding Teacher of the Philippines
Nathaniel Hermosa II	1994	Class valedictorian; professor, UP Diliman National Institute of Physics and 2017 National Academy of Science and Technology Outstanding Young Scientist awardee

== Notable faculty members ==
Faculty	Designation	Notes
Ma. Regaele Olarte	Former faculty and head, MNHS Science Department	2016 Metrobank Most Outstanding Teacher of the Philippines 2023 Ten Outstanding Young Men (TOYM) of the Philippines for Educational Leadership
Jason Albaro	Former faculty and head, MNHS Science Department	2021 Metrobank Most Outstanding Teacher of the Philippines

== See also ==
- List of schools in Muntinlupa
