= List of schools in Muntinlupa =

This is a list of schools in Muntinlupa, Metro Manila, Philippines.

== Tunasan ==
- Lyceum of Alabang INC.
- Kaku School GT
- Divine Gift Learning Center
- Divine Mercy School
- Holy Infant Academy (Main Campus)
- Holy Queen of La Salette School
- Infant Jesus Montessori School of Muntinlupa - Parkhomes
- Mountaintop Christian Academy
- Muntinlupa Science High School
- Ridgeview Academy
- Santo Niño School of Muntinlupa
- Servite School, Inc.
- The Birthright Educators Foundation Inc.
- Tunasan Elementary School
- Victoria Elementary School
- Victory Fundamental Baptist Academy
- Wise Kids School of Muntinlupa, Inc.
- Emmanuel John Institute of Science And Technology, Inc.
- Tunasan National High School

== Poblacion ==
- Christian Love School
- Itaas Elementary School
- Poblacion Elementary School
- Liceo de Piccolo Santo
- Lombosco Academy Foundation, Inc.
- Muntinlupa Christian Academy
- Muntinlupa Elementary School
- Muntinlupa National High School
- Poblacion National High School
- Our Lady of The Abandoned Catholic School
- Plena Gracia Learning School
- Pamantasan ng Lungsod ng Muntinlupa (PLMun)
- Southernside Montessori School
- Spring Christian School
- Sunshine Christian School of Muntinlupa

== Putatan ==
- Catherine McAuley Learning Center
- Child's Mind Learning Center
- Christ Baptist Academy
- Christ the King School of Muntinlupa
- Christ the Living Intercessor Christian School
- Colegio de Nuestra Señora de Guadalupe (Our lady of Guadalupe academy/Gregorio Umali Memorial School Foundation)
- F. De Mesa Elementary School
- Holy Infant Academy (Putatan Branch)
- J.B. Kiddies Learning Center
- Lakeview Integrated School
- Lakewood School of Alabang
- Living Light Academy
- Mary Cause of our Joy Catholic School
- Muntinlupa Cosmopolitan School
- Muntinlupa Institute of Technology (MIT)
- Putatan Elementary School
- SEAM Christian Learning Center, Inc.
- South Crest School
- South Mansfield College
- Soldier's Hills Elementary School

== Bayanan ==
- Bayanan Elementary School (Main Campus)
- Bayanan Elementary School (Unit 1)
- Little Angel's Learning Center
- Maranatha Christian Academy - Bayanan
- Maria Ferarri School
- MBC-Sinai School
- Mary, Mother of God Parochial School
- Muntinlupa School for Child's Development
- SEAM Christian Learning Center, Inc.
- APEC Schools Bayanan

== Alabang ==
- Alabang Elementary School
- Anima Christi Center for Learning and Human Development
- Far Eastern University Alabang
- Infant Jesus Learning Center - Alabang
- Le Sainte School
- Informatics College Northgate Alabang
- Liceo de Alabang, Inc.
- MIT International School
- Saint Bernadette College of Alabang
- Pedro E. Diaz High School
- Saint Francis of Assisi College
- Saint Peter School of Alabang
- San Roque Catholic School
- STI College (Alabang Branch)
- Theresiana de Montealegre Dame School

== Ayala Alabang ==
- De La Salle Zobel School
- Institute for Child Development
- Maria Montessori Foundation
- PAREF Woodrose School
- San Beda College Alabang
- The Learning Child School
- Virgin Mary Immaculate School
- PAREF Rosemont School

== Cupang ==
- Cupang Elementary School
- Our Lady of the Lake School
- PAREF Ridgefield School
- PAREF Southridge School
- Saint Bernadette College of Alabang
- San Beda College Alabang
- Kennedy International School of Business and Languages
- Cupang Senior High School

== Buli ==
- Muntinlupa Business High School
- Buli Elementary School
- U-BIX Institute of Technology, Inc.

== Sucat ==
- Bagong Silang Elementary School
- Bay View Academy
- Miraculous Medal School
- Saint Augustine School for the Deaf
- Sucat Elementary School
- Sucat Elementary School Sitio Pagkakaisa Annex Zone 3
- Sucat Elementary School Sitio Pagkakaisa Annex Zone 4
- Muntinlupa Business Highschool (Sucat Annex)
- Sto. Domingo Pascual Academy, Inc.
- Colegio De Muntinlupa

== Former schools in Muntinlupa ==
- Philippine Christian School of Tomorrow
- Sacred Heart Institute (Closed on 2017)

== See also ==
- List of schools in Metro Manila (primary and secondary)
- List of international schools in Metro Manila
- List of universities and colleges in Metro Manila
