= National Super Quiz Bee =

Philippine academic competition

- Quiz Bee (1977–1992); National Super Quiz Bee (1993–2005); National Quiz Bee (2006–2013, 2015–2016)
- Created by: Quiz Bee Foundation
- Developed by: Rasty Tayag
- Presented by: Rowena Zulueta; Eddie Lacsi; Bingbing Josue; Pettizou Tayag; Atom Araullo; Lea Salonga; Spanky Enriquez; Anthony Suntay; Danny Fajardo
- Country of origin: Philippines
- Original languages: English; Filipino
- No. of episodes: 210

Production
- Camera setup: Multiple-camera setup
- Running time: 1 hour (including commercials)

Original release
- Network: IBC (1996–2001); Studio 23 (2005–2013); TFC (worldwide) (2009?-2010?)
- Release: 1996 – 2013

The National Super Quiz Bee was a long-running Philippines television quiz show and academic competition that was established in 1977 by the Quiz Bee Foundation and ran until 2016 under the Foundation's auspices. It transitioned through several titles, including Quiz Bee (1977–1992), National Super Quiz Bee (1993–2005), and National Quiz Bee (2006–2013, 2015–2016).

Originally launched as a national spelling bee, the competition expanded into a multi-disciplinary televised event which aired on various networks, including Intercontinental Broadcasting Corporation (IBC) from 1996 to 2001, Studio 23 from 2005 to 2013, and via The Filipino Channel (TFC) internationally.

The prizes and TV coverage were primarily funded by the private sector, but the competition was also endorsed and assisted by various agencies of the Philippine government, including the Department of Education (DepEd), Commission on Higher Education (CHED), Department of the Interior and Local Government (DILG), the Senate of the Philippines, and the Office of the President.

At 39 years, the program holds the record for the longest-running national academic contest in the Philippines, and was also the country's longest-running televised quiz show with its 15 years of broadcast history.

== History ==
In 1976 Rasty Tayag and the erstwhile Filipino Department of Education, Culture, and Sports launched a nationwide elementary school spelling contest called the 1976 Spelling Bee Contest. Renamed as Quiz Bee the following year, the contest was held annually from 1977 onwards.

The Quiz Bee Foundation was established in 1983, with Carlos P. Romulo as founding chairman, Rasty M. Tayag as president, and the following founding trustees: Edgardo Angara, President, University of the Philippines; Dr. Helena Benitez; Dr. Estefanía Aldaba-Lim; Atty. Efrenilo Cayanga; and Mel Mathay, Governor of Metro Manila. With the death of Carlos P. Romulo in 1990, Rasty Tayag assumed the position of chairman of the foundation.

In 1993, in keeping with the Philippines 2000 program of President Fidel V. Ramos, the competition was expanded to include high school and college students and the name was changed to the National Super Quiz Bee.

== Eligibility rules ==
Any school recognized by DepEd was eligible to compete, but it could only field students who were enrolled in the school at the designated level when the season started. This included students enrolled at any private or public school, college, or university in the Philippines, but Philippine schools abroad were technically ineligible.

Unlike other quiz competitions, Quiz Bee assigned particular subject categories for each educational level.

In keeping with televised academic quiz formats in the Philippines promoting the 'give-chance-to-others' concept, a student could become National Champion only once. If a student won the elementary mathematics National Championship they were not allowed to participate in any future Super Quiz Bee rounds except for the Special Edition Quiz Bee, if held. This restriction also applied to teacher-coaches, even if they changed students.

== Hosts ==
The National Quiz Bee was hosted by numerous people over its history, often with two hosts sharing an episode, one acting as quizmaster while the other recapped scores and made other announcements. Hosts included: Rowena Zulueta; Eddie Lacsi; Bingbing Josue; Pettizou Tayag; Atom Araullo; Lea Salonga; Spanky Enriquez; Anthony Suntay; and Danny Fajardo.

== Venues ==
Division and Regional Eliminations for non-NCR (National Capital Region) regions were usually held at schools and DepEd offices within the region, while NCR District, Division, and Regional Eliminations were usually held in major shopping malls around Metro Manila, and were televised.

The National Finals and the various Super Quiz Bees were held at the locations listed in the following table.

| Season Number | Years Covered | Theme | Finals Venue |
|---|---|---|---|
| 1 | 1977-1978 | ? | |
| 2 | 1978-1979 | ? | ? |
| ASEAN Super Quiz Bee | 1979 | ? | ? |
| 3 | 1979-1980 | ? | ? |
| 4 | 1980-1981 | ? | PNB Auditorium, Iloilo City |
| 5 | 1981-1982 | ? | ? |
| 6 | 1982-1983 | ? | ? |
| 7 | 1983-1984 | ? | ? |
| 8 | 1984-1985 | ? | ? |
| 9 | 1985-1986 | ? | ? |
| 10 | 1986-1987 | ? | ? |
| 11 | 1987-1988 | ? | ? |
| Quiz Bee for the Handicapped | 1988 | ? | Philamlife Auditorium, Manila |
| 12 | 1988-1989 | ? | ? |
| 13 | 1989-1990 | ? | ? |
| World Super Quiz Bee | 1990 | ? | ? |
| 14 | 1990-1991 | ? | ? |
| 15 | 1991-1992 | ? | ? |
| 16 | 1992-1993 | ? | ? |
| 17 | 1993-1994? | ? | ? |
| ASEAN Super Quiz Bee | 1996 | ? | ? |
| 18 | 1997-1998 | ? | ?, Muntinlupa |
| 19 | 1998-1999 | ? | Expo Pilipino, Pampanga |
| 20 | 1999 | Buzzing Towards the New Millennium | Subic Bay Freeport Zone, Olongapo, Zambales |
| 21 | 2000 | ? | Development Academy of the Philippines, Tagaytay, Cavite |
| 22 | 2001 | ? | Development Academy of the Philippines, Tagaytay, Cavite |
| 23 | 2002-2003 | ? | Development Academy of the Philippines, Tagaytay, Cavite |
| 24 | 2003 | ? | Development Academy of the Philippines, Tagaytay, Cavite |
| 25 | 2004 | ? | Development Academy of the Philippines, Tagaytay, Cavite |
| 26 | 2005 | ? | Development Academy of the Philippines, Tagaytay, Cavite |
| 27 | 2006 | ? | ? |
| 28 | 2007 | ? | ? |
| 29 | 2008-2009 | ? | Development Academy of the Philippines, Tagaytay, Cavite |
| 30 | 2009-2010 | ? | Development Academy of the Philippines, Tagaytay, Cavite |
| 31 | 2010-2011 | ? | Development Academy of the Philippines, Tagaytay, Cavite |
| 32 | 2011-2012 | ? | Development Academy of the Philippines, Tagaytay, Cavite |
| 33 | 2012-2013 | ? | Development Academy of the Philippines, Tagaytay, Cavite |
| 34 | 2013 | ? | ? |
| 35 | 2015-2016 | ? | ? |

== Prizes ==
Prizes for regional champions were given, although this was not consistent every year. Prizes for national champions varied from year to year depending on sponsorship. For example, in the 28th National Quiz Bee in 2007 the winner received a presidential trophy, a gold medal, P$100,000 worth of insurance, P$70,000 worth of educational plan, a 32-volume encyclopedia set, a multimedia computer system, a mobile phone, and gift packages. The National Super Quiz Bee did not give cash prizes.

In 2005 the Philippine Daily Inquirer awarded life-sized fiberglass statues of its Guyito water buffalo (carabao) mascot to the 20 public high schools that ranked highest in the 26th National Super Quiz Bee. Originally sculpted by artist Juan Sajid Imao and decorated by the country's foremost painters, each artist was free to interpret that year's theme, "The Power of Knowing". From January to May 2006, Inquirer representatives visited the 20 selected schools and cities to present the sculptures, with a one-day Inquirer Campus Journalism Workshop held at each school.

== Special Quiz Bees ==
In addition to the annual National Quiz Bee, the Quiz Bee Foundation also organized ASEAN Super Quiz Bees in 1979 and 1996) and a World Quiz Bee in 1990, in which the national champions of the immediately preceding National Quiz Bee represented the Philippines against competitors from ASEAN member countries and the world respectively. There was also a Quiz Bee for the Handicapped in 1988.

For all three of the ASEAN and world Quiz Bees, the "Makabayan" (Philippine history and culture) category was expanded to include ASEAN history and culture and world culture respectively, as per the following table.

| Educational Level | Grade Level | Approximate Age of Competitor (years) | Category/ies |
|---|---|---|---|
| Elementary | 4-7 | 10-13 | "Makabayan" (Philippine History, Culture and Values) |
| Elementary | 4-7 | 10-13 | Mathematics |
| Secondary | 1-4 (1-5 since 32nd Bee due to K-12 adoption) | 14-17 | Science and Technology (Science, Technology and Nutrition since 32nd Bee) |
| Tertiary | 1-5 | 18-22 | General Information and International Affairs |

== Summit of the Super Quiz Bee ==
The Summit of the Super Quiz Bee was a usually 4-day camp of tours, seminars, and fellowships for regional champions and their respective teacher-coaches competing in the national finals. The national finals competition was the highlight of the summit, with the various contestants and their teacher-coaches dressing in traditional regional attire for the stage competition and a special prize given to the best in national costume.

The national finals were open to the public.

== Winners ==
(Due to limited documentation, winners from only a few selected seasons and categories are currently available.)

At the conclusion of each televised program champions were recognized first, followed by runners-up, and in later editions of the competition the runners-up assumed the responsibilities of the champions if the latter were unable to represent the Philippines in subsequent contests.

=== Season 1 (1977) ===
The inaugural season featured three categories. Jonas Lardizabal of Malate Catholic School, Manila (NCR) won in History. Mary Ann Vicentina of San Fernando West Elementary School, Pampanga (Region III) was champion in Mathematics. Jesus Clin Jr. of Naga Parochial School, Naga City (Region V) won in Science and Technology.

=== Season 2 (1978) ===
Amor Marie Reyes of St. Theresa's College, Cebu City (Region VII) won in History. Edanili Lacar of Silliman University, Dumaguete City (Region VII), took the Mathematics title. Michelle Jover of Light Bringer School, Davao City (Region XI) won in Science and Technology.

=== ASEAN Super Quiz Bee (1979) ===
Amor Marie Reyes and Hanziel Rebancos represented the Philippines in History. Carina Go was the Mathematics champion, while Michelle Jover won in Science and Technology.

=== Season 3 (1979) ===
Hanziel Rebancos of Moises Salvador Elementary School, Manila (NCR) won in History. Carina Go of Dipolog Pilot Demonstration School, Dipolog City (Region XI) won in Mathematics. Maribel Alberto of Abano Pilot School, Daet (Region V) won in Science and Technology.

=== Season 4 (1980) ===
Solomon Rosario of Ballesteros Central Elementary School, Cagayan (Region II) won in History. Honorio Allado III of Ateneo University, Davao City (Region XI) won in Mathematics. Melflor Atienza of St. Mary's College, Quezon City (NCR) won in Science and Technology.

=== Season 22 (2001) ===
Records for the History and Mathematics categories are unavailable. In Science and Technology, Anderson Pedroso of Muntinlupa Science High School (NCR) was the champion. Neil Tristan Yabut of the University of the Philippines Diliman, Quezon City (NCR) won the tertiary divisionin General Information and International Affairs.

=== Season 32 (2011–2012) ===
| Category | Winners | Region | Institution |
|---|---|---|---|
| Makabayan | Mia Clarisse Gumpa | Region II – Cagayan Valley | |
| | Ma. Abigail Rivero | Region IX – Zamboanga Peninsula | |
| Mathematics | Farrel Eldrian Wu | National Capital Region (NCR) | |
| | Dann Lawrence Llabore | Region XII - Soccsksargen | |
| Science and Technology | Mitzie Love C. Syjongtian | Region II - Cagayan Valley | |
| | Philip Christopher Cruz | Region IV A – Calabarzon | |
| General Information & International Affairs | Ritchel John Arellano | Region XI - Davao Region | Assumption College of Nabunturan |
| | Twinkle Imperial Mangi | Region IV B - Mimaropa | Marinduque State University |

=== Season 33 (2012–2013) ===
| Category | Winners | Region | Institution |
|---|---|---|---|
| Makabayan | Russel Ryan Floresca | NCR (National Capital Region) | Comembo Elementary School |
| | Khim Anne Gabuco | Region V - Bicol Region | Pawa Elementary School |
| Mathematics | Shaquille Wyan Que | NCR (National Capital Region) | Grace Christian College |
| | Genie Nicole Cortez | Region II - Cagayan Valley | Ballesteros Central School |
| Science & Technology | Rainier Mendoza | Region V - Bicol Region | San Jacinto National High School |
| | Judy Angela Carmela Parrenas | Region VII - Western Visayas | Capiz National High School |
| General Information and International Affairs | Jissey Raye Rafanan | Region IX - Zamboanga Peninsula | Pilar College |
| | Marwin de Guzmán | Region III - Central Luzon | Nueva Ecija University of Science & Technology |

== Legacy ==
National Super Quiz Bee was one of the longest-running academic competitions in the Philippines, helping to promote a culture of academic excellence among Filipino students. Through its nationwide reach and multi-level format the competition served as a platform for identifying and developing young intellectual talent across various disciplines. The competition also played a significant role in popularizing academic quiz formats on Philippine television, blending education with entertainment and inspiring similar scholastic programs. Its longevity reflected sustained support from educational institutions, government agencies, and media organizations.

Several participants have gone on to achieve distinction in international academic and creative competitions. Notable former contestants include Farrel Eldrian Wu, who later earned recognition in international mathematics competitions, and Twinkle Imperial Mangi, who received recognition, publication, and exhibition in an international socio-political art competition.

== See also ==
- List of programs broadcast by Studio 23
- List of programs broadcast by Intercontinental Broadcasting Corporation
