= Malate Catholic School =

Roman Catholic school in Manila, Philippines

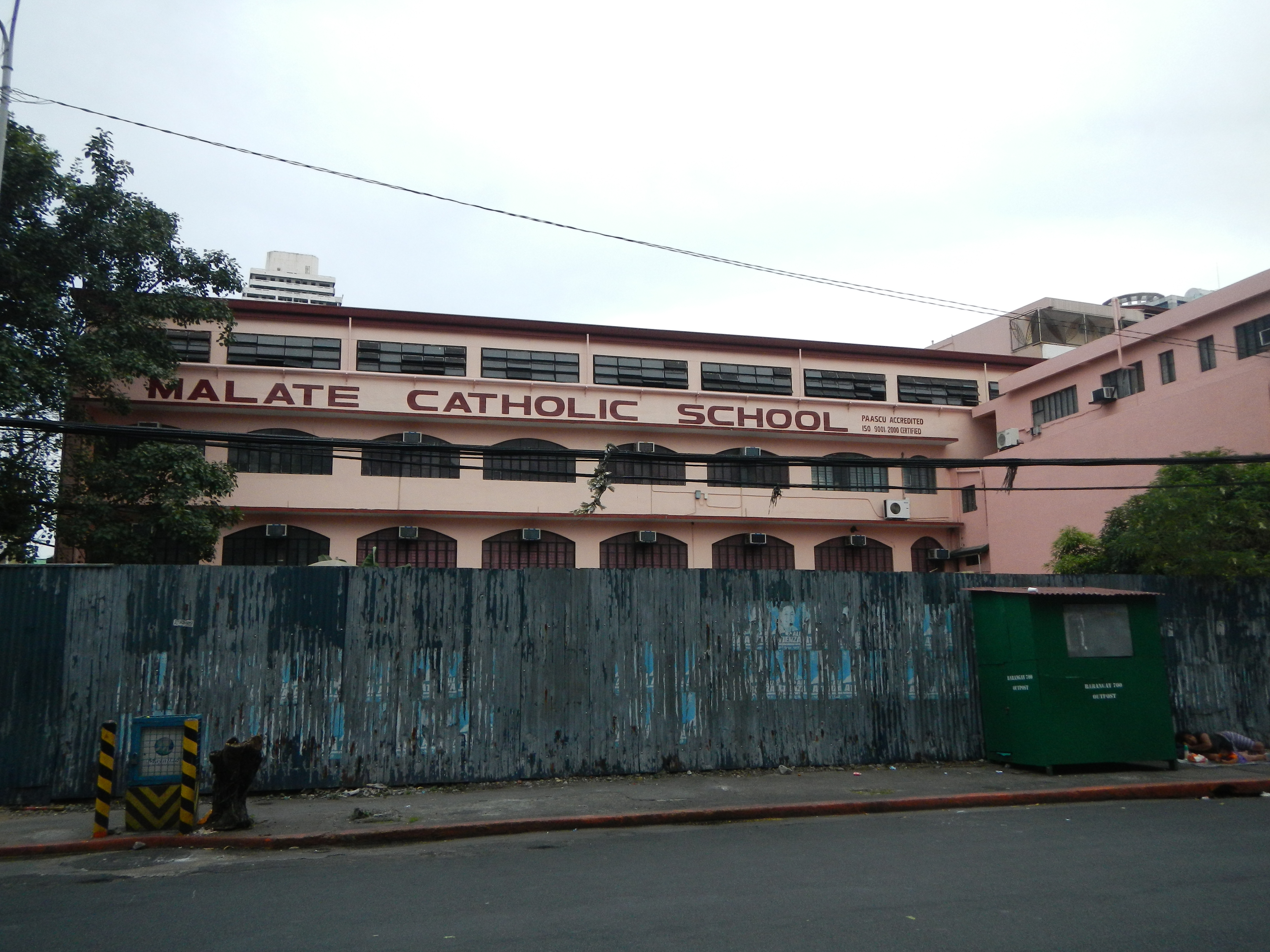

Location
- Madre Ignacia Street; Manila; Philippines; 14°34′07″N 120°59′10″E

Information
- Type: Private School, Roman Catholic
- Motto: "True to my Faith"
- Established: 1917; 109 years ago
- Status: Open
- School district: Malate, Manila
- Chaplain: Malate Church
- Teaching staff: 51 - 200 Employees
- Grades: K to 12 (2012; 14 years ago)
- Language: English (medium of instruction); Tagalog (native)
- Colors: Red and white
- Athletics: Basketball
- Nickname: Malatean
- Accreditation: PAASCU (since 1983; 43 years ago)
- Newspaper: "the Clarionette"
- Affiliations: MAPSA, CEAP, RCAMES, RVM
- Hymn: "Malate Hymn"
- Programs: STEM, HUMSS, General Academic Strand (GAS), Accounting Business Management (ABM), Technical Vocational Livelihood (TVL)
- Website: www.facebook.com/MalateCatholicSchoolOfficial/

Malate Catholic School (Filipino: Paaralang Katoliko ng Malate, abbreviated as MCS) is a private Catholic K to 12 school in Malate, Manila, Metro Manila, Philippines established in 1917. It is accredited by PAASCU.

== History ==
In 1588, Augustinian friars from Spain established a mission in Malate under the advocacy of Our Lady of Remedies. By 1596, the Augustinians had moved the small chapel to the site where the church currently stands.

The school's origins trace back to 1909, when the "Beatas de la Compañía de Jesús", now known as the Religious of the Virgin Mary (RVM) Sisters, began teaching local children at the "Escuela Catolica de Malate," which is documented in a photograph of the Beatas from that year. The parochial school was formally founded in 1917 under the Redemptorist Fathers, who then administered the parish, with Terence Brown serving as the first director and Mother Alix, a Belgian sister from St. Theresa's College, as the first principal.

The school's history was interrupted by war. In 1941, Japanese forces invaded the country and devastated Malate; the school was forced to close, and its classrooms were converted into hospital wards run by the American Red Cross as the Remedios Hospital. The conflict came to a head in 1945, the year of the American liberation, when the school was ravaged by war. By then the Columban Fathers had taken charge of the parish, and the violence claimed lives connected to the institution: John Lalor was killed on the hospital premises, while others were killed in the church alongside other martyrs.

The school reopened in 1946 on the Grade School Campus after repairs under the leadership of Sheehan. In 1957, management of the school was turned over to the Columban Sisters, with Mary Bernardine serving as the first superior.

Between 1963 and 1983, the MCS saw considerable progress and growth in student population, which required the construction of a new building. In 1972, a five-storey building, now named the Assumption Building, opened for the girls' high school and was blessed by Cardinal Rufino J. Santos, the Archbishop of Manila, on January 22 of that year. James McCarthy took over direction of the school alongside the Columban Sisters in 1974, and in 1975, Bishop Leonardo Legaspi headed the School Board while Ma. Laetetia was appointed Assistant School Directress. MCS achieved a notable distinction in 1977 as the first National Quiz Bee Champion in the History category, and the following year became a member of the Center for Educational Measurement (CEM), adopting its varied testing materials. In April 1982, the school was placed under a Board of Trustees headed by Bishop Gaudencio Rosales, Auxiliary Bishop of Manila, with Mary Laetetia appointed School Directress. The following year, MCS passed the preliminary accreditation of the Philippine Accrediting Association of Schools, Colleges and Universities (PAASCU).

In 1985, a three-storey building named after San Lorenzo Ruiz was constructed on the Boys' campus. The following year, the school purchased a residential house and lot adjacent to the Boys' campus, initially used as a typing room and medical clinic for the boys before being renovated into the RVM Sisters' convent in 1990. In 1987, MCS underwent its second formal PAASCU re-visit and was granted a five-year accreditation status. The school's students achieved notable successes in 1988, first winning at a national level in the Rotary-sponsored Public Speaking contest, and then sending a delegate to London who won the international competition; that same year, the school's representative to the Manila City Girls' and Boys' Week was elected Youth Mayor of the city.

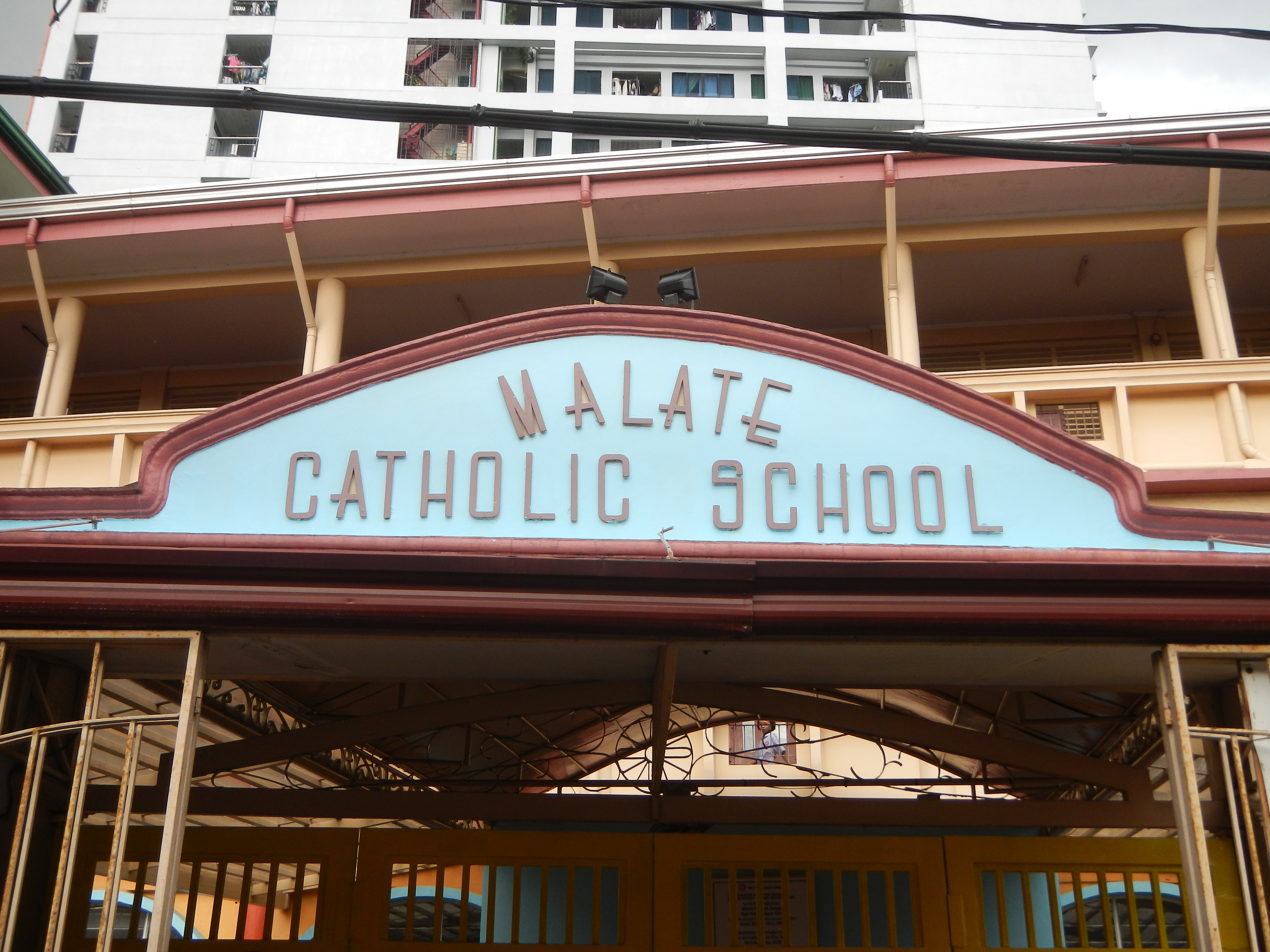
The Grade School Campus

In 1990, management of the school passed from the Columban Fathers to the Religious of the Virgin Mary (RVM) Congregation, with Ma. Rita Ferraris appointed as school directress. That same year, on July 16, a devastating earthquake struck Luzon and partly destroyed the old grade school building, prompting a fund-raising drive called "Piso Mula sa Puso" to finance a new Our Lady of Remedies building. Cardinal Jaime L. Sin, Archbishop of Manila, assisted by Bishop Manuel Sobreviñas, his auxiliary and chairman of the MCS Board of Trustees, blessed and laid the building's cornerstone on October 23, 1990. Ma. Clarita R. Balleque succeeded Ma. Rita Ferraris on December 8, 1990. In 1991, MCS launched its Diamond Jubilee, and preparations began for its third PAASCU re-survey.

In 1992, Gabriel Reyes, then Auxiliary Bishop of Manila, launched the Madre Ignacia Movement's Malate chapter on March 1. That same year, MCS underwent the PAASCU re-survey, using Form B of the analysis and evaluation process for the first time, and was once again granted a five-year accreditation status.

On July 4, 1994, Cardinal Jaime L. Sin blessed the newly built Our Lady of Remedies building, which housed the library, computer and science laboratories, faculty room, and classrooms for the girls' grade school. Construction of a new Madre Ignacia building on the Boys' campus also began that year, and Sr. Clarita encouraged the school community to establish a credit cooperative, which continues to grow in membership and financial capacity.

In 1995, Ma. Rafaela Q. Singzon replaced Ma. Clarita, who had been elected Superior General of the RVM Congregation. Manuel Sobreviñas, chair of the MCS Board of Trustees, blessed the Madre Ignacia building on the Boys' campus, which housed libraries, science and computer laboratories, and faculty rooms. That same year, MCS also served as a host school for local and foreign delegates during the World Youth Day celebration led by Pope John Paul II.

The Immaculate Conception building was blessed in time for the PAASCU visit. The building houses the chapel, directress office, faculty room, music and art rooms, ballet room, classrooms for the girls high school and the PE hall at the rooftop. Gerardo O. Santos, the superintendent of MAPSA-South Manila, was the new chairman of the board of trustees. The school gymnasium was renovated to have more bleachers to accommodate more audience.

The 1997 school year brought numerous physical improvements to the campus:, including the renovation of both the AV-Little Theater and the school gymnasium (which was dedicated in honor of Cardinal Jaime L. Sin, as well as the construction of the new Immaculate Conception building. Moreover, the canteens in both the Boys' and Girls' campuses were expanded, internet service was launched in the multimedia center of the Immaculate Conception building, and the Queen of Peace Ladies Dormitory was built on the site of the Sisters' convent. Three ground-floor classrooms in the St. Joseph building on the Boys' campus were converted into a function room and social hall, and the Finance Office was computerized.

In 1998, PAASCU conducted its fourth re-survey of the school, again using Form B, and granted MCS another five-year accredited status. The Immaculate Conception building was blessed in time for the PAASCU visit; it housed the chapel, directress's office, faculty room, music and art rooms, ballet room, high school classrooms for girls, and a PE hall on the rooftop. Gerardo O. Santos, superintendent of MAPSA-South Manila, became the new chairman of the Board of Trustees, and the school gymnasium was renovated with more bleachers to accommodate larger audiences.

In 2001, Ma. Alice S. Tan succeeded Ma. Rafaela Q. Singzon as school directress. This year marked a significant restructuring of departments and the integration of the entire school program: the retirement of two principals paved the way for merging the Grade School Department (no longer divided into Boys' and Girls' sections) with the High School Department. The Board of Trustees appointed a single principal for the Grade School, whilst Directress Ma. Alice Tan served as the concurrent and transitional principal of the High School Department.

A new high school principal was appointed in 2002, further strengthening the integration effort. Several considerable developments took place that year, including the intensification of the Program of Instruction through the creation of a Curriculum Committee, and the redesign of the school curriculum to include special courses in Speech, SRA, and Computer studies in line with the Department of Education's new Basic Education Curriculum (BEC). Lay administrators were empowered through the adoption of a Minimum Level of Authority strategy in decision-making, and the school began pursuing International Organization for Standardization (ISO) certification by training Internal Quality Auditors (IQAs) to regularly assess and evaluate school services. The school's mission and vision statement was refined and rewritten, a "cool mist system" donated by the MCS Alumni Association was installed in the gym, and an official office was provided for the Parent-Teachers Advisory Council (PTAC).

In 2003, MCS earned recognition for quality management meeting international standards, receiving ISO 9001-2000 certification from the external agency TÜV Rheinland Philippines. The awarding ceremony was attended by the Board of Trustees, former BOT Chair Msgr. Manuel Sobreviñas, officers of the MCS Alumni Association, the Parents Council, and guests from the Department of Education and city government. That year, self-contained classes for grades one and two were adopted, along with co-educational classes at the same levels. The school also launched festivals for fathers, mothers, and children to celebrate the Fourth World Meeting of Families in Manila. From April 3–6, 2003, MCS administrators and Internal Quality Auditors traveled to Thailand to benchmark practices with Assumption University. The school additionally applied for membership in international organizations, including the Association of Human Resource Practitioners of the Philippines (ASHRPI) and the World Council for Curriculum and Instruction (WCCI), while the Alumni Association revived its annual homecoming, intensified its scholarship program, and launched fund-raising drives for school improvement.

In August 2004, MCS underwent its fifth PAASCU re-survey and was again granted a five-year accredited status, with an interim visit in the area of instruction scheduled for the third year. The school adopted a computerized grading system that year, and the MCS Alumni Association (MCSAA) gave tribute to outstanding graduates and alumni with awards of recognition. Sr. Alice began preparing the school community for another significant integration of the high school and grade school departments, and before the school year ended, the Administrative Council, with approval from the Board of Trustees, decided to appoint a single principal for the entire school. Electrical re-wiring was carried out in the Boys' campus buildings for improved safety, and a Non-Formal Education program and Night High School were launched through the initiative of the Social Action Center.

In 2005, Ma. Celestine T. Viernes replaced Ma. Alice Tan as directress, and MCS began operating under a single principal for the entire school, in the aim of uniting the school community more closely around a shared mission and vision. That year, groups of administrators and teachers from Japan, Korea, and Singapore visited MCS, and key administrators from Southville International School in Parañaque were assembled at the school for a round-table discussion on the ISO certification process. The school also adopted a biometric identification system for employee attendance.

In 2006, with the Board of Trustees' approval, the school invested in air-conditioning for all classrooms, and the ballet room in the Immaculate Conception building was converted into a museum exhibiting the school's memorabilia from the past. Numerous other improvements took place that year: a research center was established, and several new programs were drafted, adopted, and implemented, including wellness, research, recruitment and retention, and management succession and supervisory programs for the principal, vice-principal or academic coordinator, subject area coordinator, and physical plant supervisor. The elevator in the Assumption building was repaired and reopened to facilitate classroom monitoring, and two speech laboratories were transferred from the Boys' campus to the San Lorenzo building. MCSAA provided billboards for both campuses, and the Night High School for out-of-school youth was formally and officially established with recognition from the Department of Education. Faculty and staff were also offered international travel on an easy payment scheme to broaden their cultural exposure, with the first trip taken to China, Macau, and Hong Kong, while the Directress and Principal visited King's School in Bangkok, Thailand. Additionally, the PTACI donated a digital time clock for the gym, and a Yamaha School of Music Extension Center was established for students wishing to develop their musical skills.

In 2007, all sections and classes were named after saints, and Night High School (NHS) enrollment grew to over one hundred students; the first batch of fourteen NHS graduates held their graduation on April 11, 2008. The PTAC office was relocated to the ground floor of the Immaculate Conception building, and the old flat sheet-entrance gates of both campuses were replaced with iron gates bearing the school's name and logo, while the Boys' campus façade also benefited from refurbishment. The high school speech laboratory was upgraded with elevated seating, a new console, and video equipment. That April, the science and mathematics coordinators spent seven days training and benchmarking at the National Institute of Education (NIE) in Singapore. The MCS Alumni Association took on the repair of the gymnasium roofing as its project for the year, and the school participated in the Rotary-sponsored Voice of the Youth extemporaneous speaking contest, with its delegate winning at the national level and advancing to compete internationally in London, England.

In preparation for the opening of the 2008 school year, the Boys' library was renovated and extended to the third floor of the Madre Ignacia Building to accommodate more students, and ten additional computer units were purchased to expand internet-connected working and research stations in the library, which also adopted a new computerized cataloguing system. The buildings on the Boys' campus were repainted, and new lighting was installed in the ground floor lobby of the St. Joseph building. In May, the Administrative Council took another benchmarking trip to Singapore, visiting the National Institute of Education (part of the Nanyang University system) where they observed the emerging trend of "Classrooms of the Future," and also studied computer-aided instruction at LEAD (Learning Advantage). In October, the subject area coordinators and Student Services Unit Heads likewise visited NIE, Nanyang University, and LEAD to gain first-hand experience of practices used abroad that could be adopted at MCS.

That year, an encoding center was established on the Boys' campus, and the school was recognized by CEM for thirty years of partnership. The Board of Trustees, led by Santos, recommended relocating the Girls Grade School to the Boys' campus to consolidate it as the Grade School Campus, while moving the Boys High School to the Girls' campus to become the High School Campus. The change offered financial savings by reducing duplicate sets of books and facilities, such as speech laboratories, from four down to two. Also in 2008, the faculty and staff of MCS received gala uniforms, and first communicants began wearing white gala dresses for their first communion, a practice that would continue every first Friday of the month starting in the 2009–2010 school year.

Based on the Board of Trustees' recommendation, the high school boys were transferred to the Our Lady of Remedies Building in 2009, and grade school girls from grades 3 to 6 moved to the St. Joseph Building. The two campuses, previously known as the Girls’ Campus and Boys’ Campus, were renamed the High School Campus and Grade School Campus. Major physical improvements that year included the renovation of the speech laboratory in the San Lorenzo Building on the Grade School Campus, the construction of a 150-person seminar room in the Immaculate Conception Building, and the installation of a new fifth-floor bridge connecting the Assumption Building and the Our Lady of Remedies Building. All comfort rooms on both campuses underwent major repairs, a grill fence and four 350-watt floodlights were installed on the High School Campus, and a new gate and canopy were built on the Grade School Campus, along with cork and whiteboards provided for all classrooms. Educators from Singapore visited MCS for a round-table discussion on the school's reading program, and outstanding teachers were recognized through the "Heart of a Teacher" Award.

In May 2010, administrators traveled to New York for benchmarking purposes, visiting two Catholic institutions, the Immaculate Conception School and the Mary Louis Academy, and engaging in dialogue with their administrators. A new principal was appointed that year, and the Grade School academic coordinator trained as a PAASCU accreditor. MCS underwent its sixth PAASCU re-survey visit, held August 31 to September 1 for the high school and September 6 to 7 for the grade school, and was granted another five-year accreditation, reflecting the school's ongoing commitment to quality Catholic education. Cake and bread making was introduced under the Skills Training Program of the Pastoral Ministry, in coordination with the City Development of Manila and TESDA.

Taking into account recommendations from PAASCU's 2004 visit, the school undertook several significant developments: closer monitoring of the Protect Instruction Program, intensified faculty development, continuous upgrading of instruction through supervision by the subject area coordinator, academic coordinator, and principal, and ongoing acquisition of print and non-print materials for both libraries. The school also increased student-centered activities, encouraged greater involvement of faculty and students in parish activities, improved the salary scheme, and continued upgrading facilities and services. English remained the medium of instruction in all subjects except Filipino, supported by English enhancement sessions for teachers, and the BCEP and SSTP programs were improved to better address students' varied needs. Teachers were encouraged to pursue graduate studies, with some receiving school-funded scholarships, and units or diplomas earned in graduate study became a factor in teacher performance ratings.

During strategic planning that year, the school decided on a 10% tuition fee increase effective for the 2011–2012 school year, along with an upgraded grading system and new enrichment classes in English, Science, and Math for the High School Department to strengthen students' mastery of required competencies and better prepare them for college. The school also reactivated the Homeroom Parents Officers to foster stronger partnership between parents and the school, continued implementing its cost-cutting program, and worked to identify and train students with potential for out-of-school competitions while strengthening recruitment and retention efforts. Syllabi and course outlines were revised, with high school competencies aligned to the content standards of the new secondary education curriculum, and learning plans were developed for Understanding by Design (UbD) implementation in the first and second year levels. In May, administrators also traveled to South Korea for further benchmarking, visiting a public elementary school there.

In 2011, Ma. Corazon P. Agoncillo was appointed as the new school directress, replacing Ma. Celestine T. Viernes. That year, extra and co-curricular activities were intensified, as was student participation in inter-school competitions, and the Faculty and Personnel Development Program reached its peak. The school also conducted benchmarking visits to Don Bosco Technical School, Xavier School, and Southville International School as part of its plan to venture into technology integration and adopt the Genyo platform in the following school year.

In 2012, the school initiated a techno-plan integrating technology into instruction. The Grade School Campus was newly renovated to house the latest Genyo Laboratory, equipped with internet connectivity, and the school subscribed to the Genyo Management System for grades 5, 6, 7, and second-year high school. A Genyo Laboratory was also constructed for the High School Campus, and renovation of the High School Campus began that year. The Faculty Development Program continued to be intensified, and students, faculty, personnel, parents, and alumni were all heavily involved in the school's outreach program. Faculty revived classroom-based action research to help improve instruction, and the K to 12 Program was introduced with the adoption of the Grade 1 and Grade 7 curricula.

In 2013, the school followed through its Five-Year Institutional Development Program (2012–2017), integrating action plans based on the PAASCU Team's recommendations from September 2010 and the RCAM ES KRAs. The Student Manual/Diary was revised, and the Bridging Program was revived for the summer. LCDs were installed in all classrooms, and fifty YoPads were acquired for use by Grade 7 students. Administration, teachers, staff, and maintenance personnel took an educational and recreational trip to Hong Kong and Macau, and the High School buildings and classrooms were repainted. The main water tank in the Assumption Building was replaced with two new tanks, and the school was named Grand Finalist in Eat Bulaga!'s High School Division Pautakan, as well as in the Pep Squad Competition.

== Alma Mater Hymn ==
"There's a school by the Church of Malate That we honor with heart sincere; It's our own school and none could be better, To our mem'ry t'will always be dear, For the truths that we learn in Malate Will guide us forever more, Loyal to God and our country When life's long pilgrimage is o'er When the days of our schooling is over, And the battle of life must be won, Our strength will be found in the teaching We learned in Malate while young Undaunted by fears and temptations, Steadfast and virtue our rule "True to my Faith" is our Motto, The bond of Malate Catholic School."

== Notable alumni and faculty ==
=== National leaders and politicians ===
- Rep. Ruffy Biazon (GS, HS 1986), former Congressional Representative of the City of Muntinlupa, former 2010 senatorial candidate, and commissioner of the Bureau of Customs, 2011–2013.

=== Celebrities, singers and directors ===
- Kuh Ledesma (HS 1974), Filipino pop singer, diva and celebrity icon
- Maryo J. De Los Reyes (GS), acclaimed and award-winning Filipino film and TV director
- Nyoy Volante, Filipino acoustic singer and celebrity

=== Notable faculty ===
- Lorenza Agoncillo, one of the makers of the first Philippine national flag that was unfurled during the declaration of Philippine independence in 1898; faculty teacher of Malate Catholic School for more than 50 years

== See also ==
- Commission on Higher Education (Philippines)
- Department of Education (Philippines)
- Technical Education and Skills Development Authority
