= Poblacion, Muntinlupa =

Barangay in Muntinlupa City, Metro Manila, Philippines

Poblacion
- Barangay
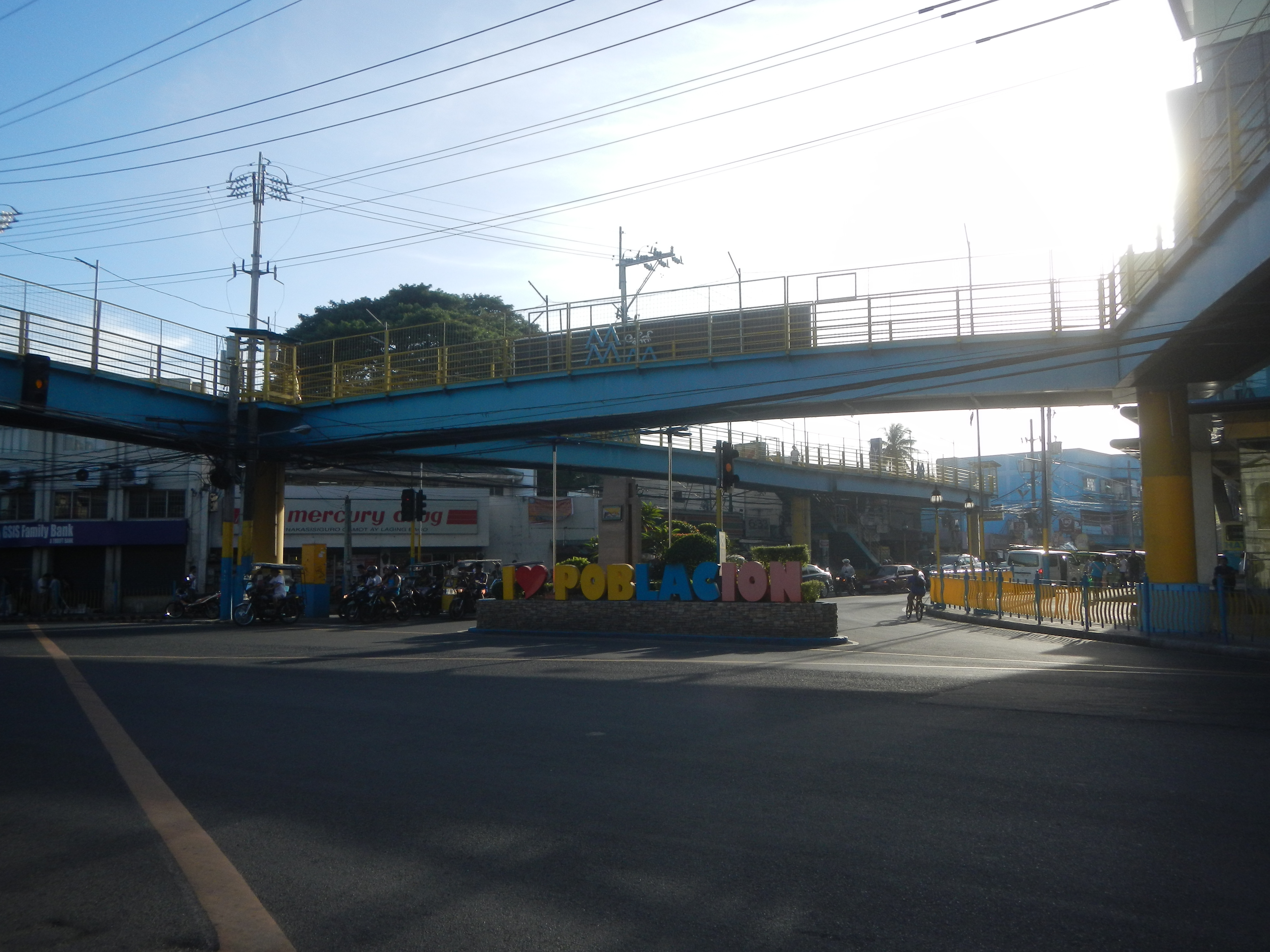
- Intersection of Katihan Road and Manila South Road
- Coordinates: 14°23′7.48″N 121°1′44.52″E
- Country: Philippines
- Region: National Capital Region
- City: Muntinlupa
- District: 1st Legislative district of Muntinlupa

Government
  - Type: Barangay
  - Barangay Captain: Allen Ampaya
  - SK Chairperson: Noreen Argana

Area
  - Total: 6.131 km^{2} (2.367 sq mi)

Population (2024)
  - Total: 124,554
  - Density: 20,320/km^{2} (52,620/sq mi)
- Time zone: UTC+8 (PST)
- Postal Code: 1776
- Area code: 02
- Range: Marikina Valley Fault Ridge

Poblacion is one of the nine barangays of Muntinlupa, Metro Manila, Philippines. It is also the center of the city, hence the name which translates to center in Spanish.

The barangay encompasses the NBP Reservation, which houses the National Bilibid Prison along with several historical sites in the city, including the Memorial Grotto, the Japanese Cemetery, and the Director's Quarter. Within the barangay, there are public primary schools such as Muntinlupa Elementary School and Itaas Elementary School, a public secondary school known as Muntinlupa National High School, and the city's sole public tertiary institution, Pamantasan ng Lungsod ng Muntinlupa. Additionally, there are private schools in the area, namely Our Lady of The Abandoned Catholic School and Southernside Montessori School.

The total land area of the barangay is 6.131 m^{2} (65.99 sq ft) of which 5.51 m^{2} (59.3 sq ft) is part of the NBP Reservation. It has a population of 103,104 which makes this the most populated barangay in the City of Muntinlupa. It is located in the southern section of the city close to Metro Manila's border with Laguna. It is bounded on the north by the Muntinlupa barangays of Putatan and Ayala Alabang, on the south by the Muntinlupa barangay of Tunasan, on the west by the Las Piñas barangay of Almanza Dos, and on the east by Laguna de Bay.

== Demographics ==
Year	Population
2007	69,600
2010	103,104
2015	115,387
2020	120,115
2024	124,554

== Subdivisions ==
While barangays are the administrative divisions of the city, and are legally part of the addresses of establishments and homes, residents usually indicate subdivisions. Listed below are subdivisions in this barangay.

- Camella Homes Alabang IV-A
- Katarungan Village
- Vicar Village
- Southville III
- New Tensuan Site
- Old Tensuan Site
- Pulong Diego

Poblacion has several streets where people reside including the streets of Amparo and Quezon as well as the lakeshore community called "Aplaya".

== NBP Reservation ==
On 1936, the Commonwealth of the Philippines enacted Commonwealth Act No. 67 and a new prison was built in Muntinlupa on 551 hectares of land.

On June 5, 2014, Department of Justice Undersecretary Francisco Baraan III, supervising official on the Bureau of Corrections and the NBP, said that the National Penitentiary will be moved to Barangay San Isidro in Laur, Nueva Ecija. The Government plans to create a regional prison on Nueva Ecija through Public-Private Partnership.

There are several landmarks in the reservation where the following could be seen:

- The Bureau of Corrections Administration Building – This is a prison facade that houses the offices of the prison administration. The maximum security compound, consisting of 12 buildings called brigades are located at the western side of the facade. The structures were built in 1941, but it is the area of the medium security compound that is being shown in movies and in television. The maximum security compound was never shown in TV or in movies, except for the Office of the Director and the front view of the Maximum Security Compound.
- Jamboree Lake – This is the smallest natural lake in the country, a favorite hang-out spot for nature lovers, as well as ordinary passers-by looking for a cool respite from the tropical heat. The lake has been in existence since time immemorial.
- Memorial Hill – This is a small hill in the NBP reservation compound that cradles a World War II Vintage Japanese canon. The hill is likewise the burial place of Eriberto Misa the famous Prison's Director from 1937 to 1949.
- Director's Quarters – The structure manifest an influence of a pre-war architecture that characterizes the outstanding edifice. This was built simultaneously with the Administration Building in 1941. This is also the official residence of the Director of Bureau of Corrections.
- The Japanese Garden Cemetery – The cemetery is a burial place of Gen. Tomoyuki Yamashita, the Japanese general who became famous during the Japanese occupation of the country.

=== Katarungan Village ===
On September 5, 1991, President Corazon C. Aquino issued Presidential Proclamation No. 792, which was amended by Presidential Proclamation No. 120 on December 15, 1992, to the effect that 104.22 hectares of land be developed into housing for employees of the Department of Justice and other government agencies. This housing project is known as the Katarungan ("Justice") Village.

== Education ==
The Department of Education (DepEd) is responsible for basic education in the Philippines. The Commission on Higher Education (CHED) is responsible for Higher Education in the Philippines.

Schools located in the barangay are as follows:

- Christian Love School
- Itaas Elementary School
- Poblacion Elementary School
- Liceo de Piccolo Santo
- Lombosco Academy Foundation, Inc.
- Muntinlupa Christian Academy
- Muntinlupa Elementary School
- Muntinlupa National High School
- Poblacion National High School
- Our Lady of The Abandoned Catholic School
- Plena Gracia Learning School
- Pamantasan ng Lungsod ng Muntinlupa (PLMun)
- Sacred Heart institute (Now, Part of Muntinlupa Central Elementary School)
- Southernside Montessori School and Colleges inc.
- Spring Christian School
- Sunshine Christian School of Muntinlupa

== See also ==
- Muntinlupa Sunken Garden
