= Tunasan =

Barangay in Muntinlupa City, Metro Manila, Philippines

- Barangay
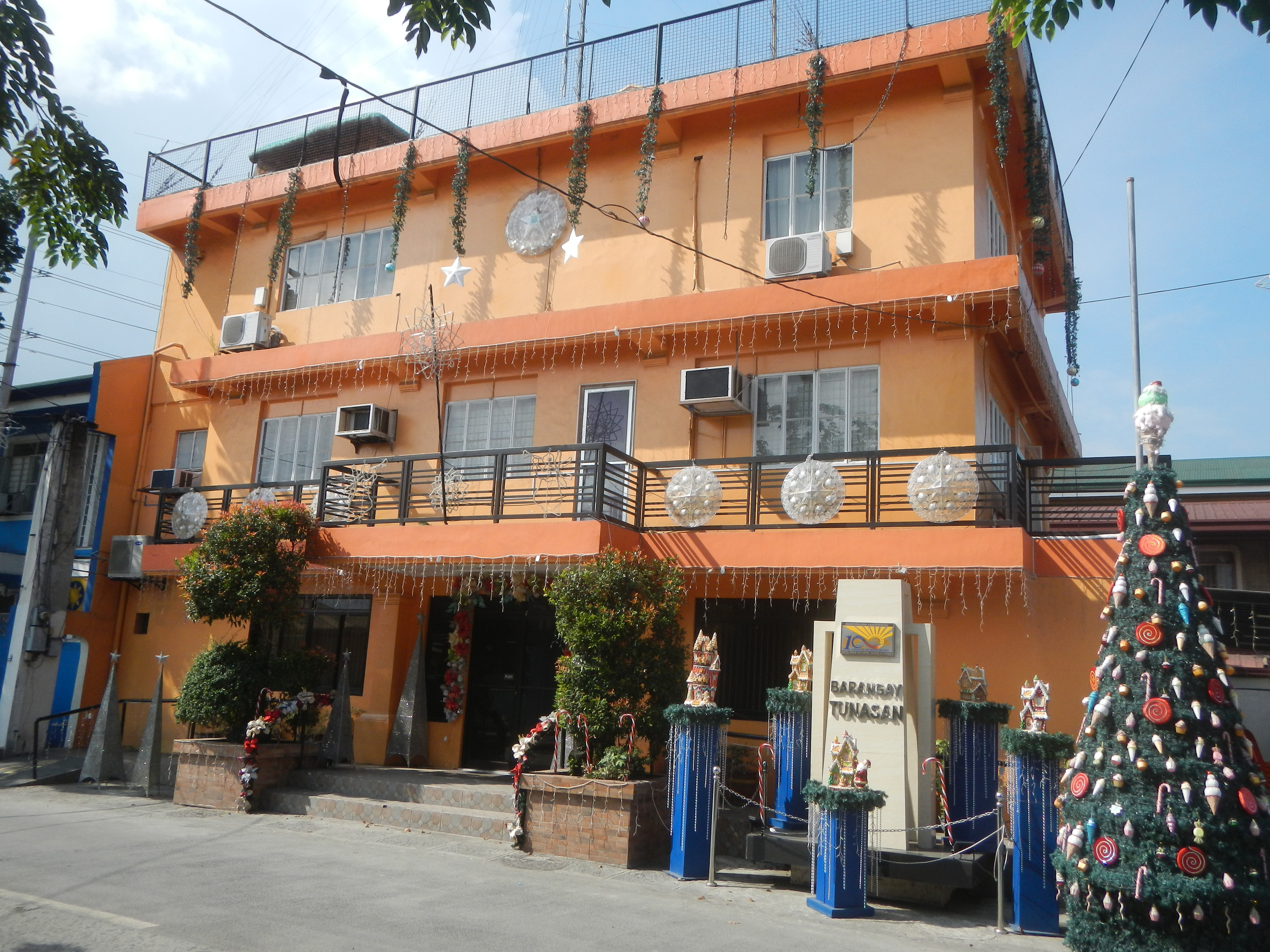
- Barangay Hall of Tunasan
- Map
- Coordinates: 14°22′21.16″N 121°2′10.96″E
- Country: Philippines
- Region: National Capital Region
- City: Muntinlupa
- District: 1st Legislative district of Muntinlupa
- Established: June 28, 1964

Government
  - Type: Barangay
  - Barangay Captain: John Dave Arcilla
  - SK Chairperson: Ryan Marmeto

Area
  - Total: 9.596 km^{2} (3.705 sq mi)

Population (2020)
  - Total: 61,374
  - Density: 6,396/km^{2} (16,570/sq mi)
- Time zone: UTC+8 (PST)
- Postal Code: 1773; 1774 (Susana Heights)
- Area code: 02
- Range: Marikina Valley Fault Ridge

Tunasan (Tagalog pronunciation: [tuˈna.san̩]) is a barangay in Muntinlupa, Philippines. It is the southernmost barangay of Metro Manila, located in the southern section of the city bordering the province of Laguna. The total land area of the barangay is 9.596 km^{2} (3.705 sq mi), the largest in the city. According to the 2020 census, it has a population of 61,374.

Tunasan is 27 kilometres (17 mi) south of Manila. It borders Poblacion, Muntinlupa to the north, Laguna de Bay to the east, the San Pedro barangays of San Antonio and Cuyab to the south, the Las Piñas barangay of Almanza Uno to the west, and the Dasmariñas barangay of Salawag to the southwest.

== Etymology ==
Tunasan got its name from a medicinal plant locally called tunas (Nymphaea nouchali), which was abundant on the Tunasan River and the shoreline of Laguna de Bay.

There are also three legends or myths that possibly explain the origin of Tunasan's name:

- Tunasan was apparently named after Datu Tuna Asomal, who was registered as the area's landowner according to a document called Torrens Title. His father, Datu Manaplo, founded the present-day settlement as Bagbagan in the mid-13th century when they settled here upon docking at Laguna de Bay from Panay and Ancient Tondo (present-day Manila). Bagbagan was said to be later renamed Tunasan in 1735.
- According to old folks, Tunasan was a haven of hardened criminals and pirates (Tagalog: tulisan), hence, it was called such.
- According to a legend, when the Americans stocked their tuna sardines in the area, the people hid them. Every time they eat, they send an errand boy to get some, and he would ask, "Where?" (Tagalog: s'an, shortened term of saan). Being so repeatedly through time, the term Tuna-san was coined, which became the name of the place.

== History ==
Tunasan was called "Tunasancillo" during the Spanish colonial period, and it was a barrio and also a part of the vast hacienda owned by the Augustinian Recollects in the pueblo or town of San Pedro Tunasan in the province of La Laguna. San Pedro Tunasan was annexed to Biñan in 1903. Eventually, the barrio became part of Muntinlupa, which was then part of Taguig in the province of Rizal when San Pedro Tunasan sold it in 1907 during the American period. After the separation, San Pedro Tunasan changed its name to San Pedro and the sold barangay of Tunasancillo was renamed Tunasan.

== Demographics ==
| Year | Population |
|---|---|
| 2007 | 55,502 |
| 2010 | 51,033 |
| 2015 | 53,078 |
| 2020 | 61,374 |
| 2024 | 63,217 |

== Subdivisions ==
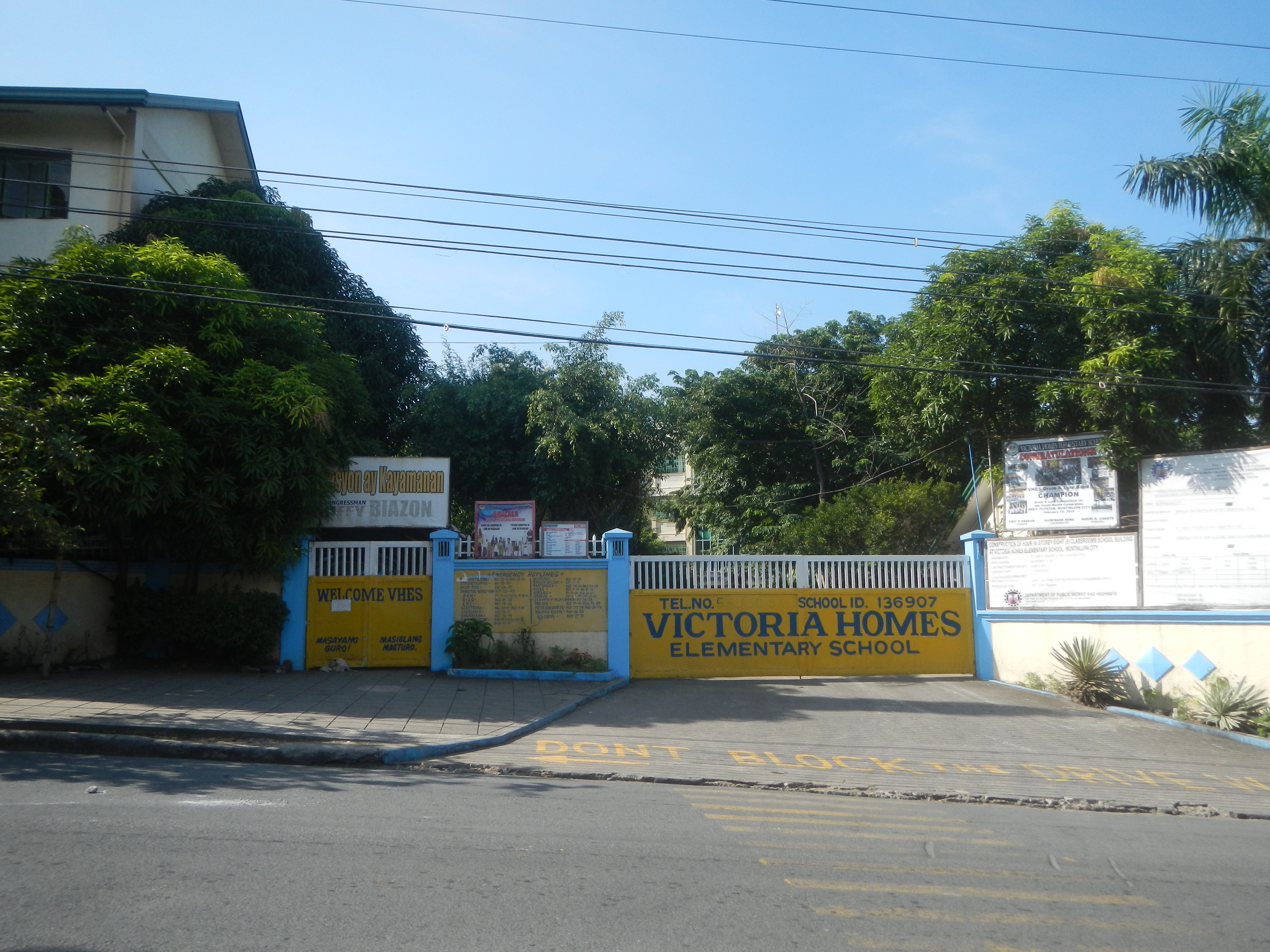
Victoria Homes Elementary Homes inside Victoria Homes Subdivision

While barangays are the administrative divisions of the city and are legally part of the addresses of establishments and homes, residents also include their respective subdivisions. Listed below are the subdivisions in this barangay.

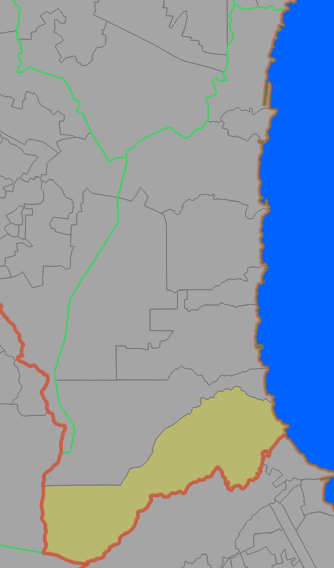
Brgy. Tunasan in Muntinlupa

- Abbey Place
- Aguila Village
- Brazilia Heights Subdivision
- Camella Homes 3
- Camella Homes Ridgeview I Subdivision
- Camella Homes Ridgeview II Subdivision
- JPA Subdivision
- Lake Shore Subdivision
- Lindenwood Residences
- Lodora Subdivision
- Midland II Subdivision
- Parkhomes Subdivision
- Sto. Niño Village
- Susana Heights Subdivision
- Teosejo Industrial Complex
- Teosejo Subdivision
- Victoria Homes Subdivision
- Villa Carolina I
- Villa Carolina II

== Laguerta Compound ==
SM Development Corporation donated an 8,348-square-metre (89,860 sq ft) property in Laguerta, Barangay Tunasan for residential use. Several government offices and buildings are also in this area.

- Department of Education - Muntinlupa
- Tunasan National High School
- Muntinlupa City Health Office
- Muntinlupa City Police Headquarters
- Museo ng Muntinlupa
- Bulilit Center

== Tunasan Baywalk ==
The Tunasan Baywalk is a reclaimed area behind Muntinlupa Science High School, where the Muntinlupa Sports Complex is located.

== Education ==
The Department of Education (DepEd) is responsible for basic education in the Philippines. The Commission on Higher Education (CHED) is responsible for Higher Education in the Philippines.

Schools located in the barangay are as follows:

- Lyceum of Alabang INC.
- Kaku School GT
- Divine Gift Learning Center
- Divine Mercy School
- Holy Infant Academy (Main Campus)
- Holy Queen of La Salette School
- Infant Jesus Montessori School of Muntinlupa - Parkhomes
- Mountaintop Christian Academy
- Muntinlupa Science High School
- Ridgeview Academy
- Santo Niño School of Muntinlupa
- Servite School, Inc.
- The Birthright Educators Foundation Inc.
- Tunasan Elementary School
- Victoria Elementary School
- Victory Fundamental Baptist Academy
- Wise Kids School of Muntinlupa, Inc.
- Emmanuel John Institute of Science And Technology, Inc.
- Tunasan National High School

== See also ==
- Tunasan River
- SM Center Muntinlupa
