= Jamboree Lake =

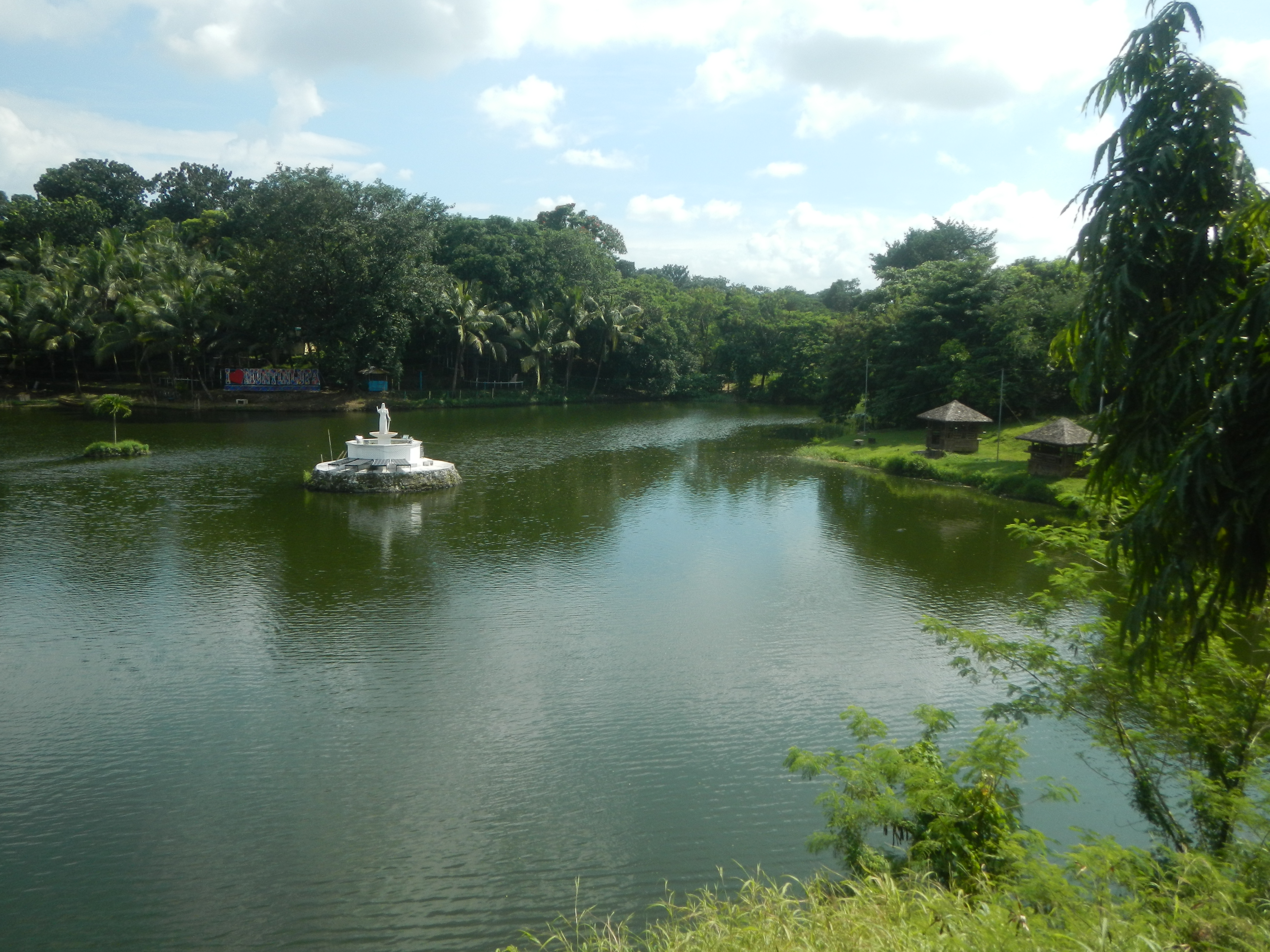
- View southwest from General Paulino Santos Avenue near Gate 1

- Location within Metro Manila
- Location: Muntinlupa, Philippines
- Coordinates: 14°23′8″N 121°2′8″E
- Type: Natural lake
- Primary inflows: None
- Primary outflows: None
- Basin countries: Philippines
- Max. length: 0.28-kilometer (0.17 mi)
- Max. width: 0.12-kilometer (0.075 mi)
- Surface area: 1.5 ha (3.7 acres)
- Islands: 1

Jamboree Lake is a small recreational lake in Muntinlupa, Metro Manila, Philippines. At 1.5 hectares (3.7 acres), it is the smallest natural lake in the country, located within the 587-hectare (1,450-acre) New Bilibid Prison Reservation. It is one of two lakes entirely in Metro Manila, the other being the artificial La Mesa Dam and Reservoir in Quezon City.

== Description ==
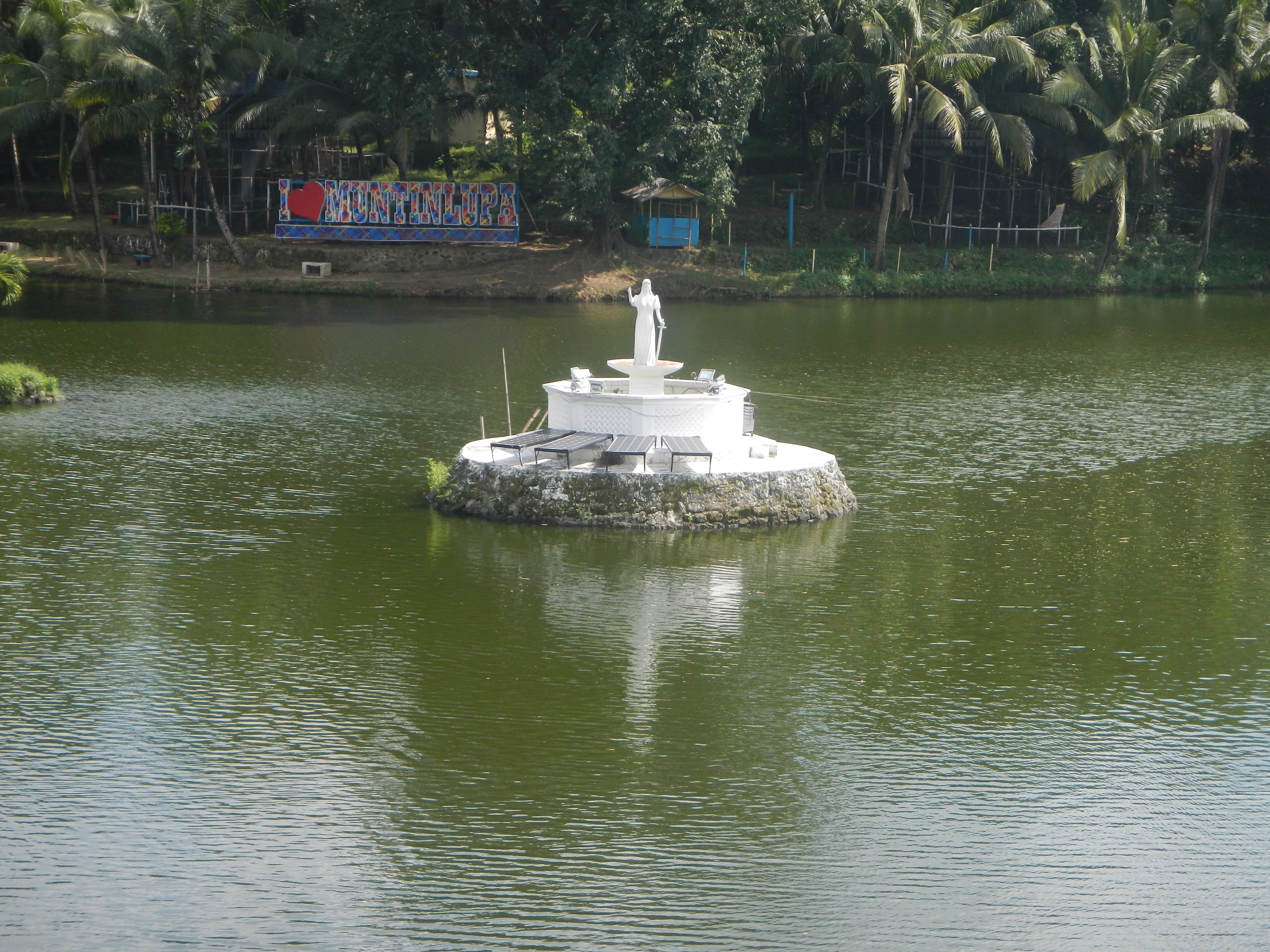
Fountain with Lady Justice on the islet in the middle of Jamboree Lake

Jamboree Lake is a narrow, serpentine lake, about 0.28 kilometers (0.17 mi) long, and situated some 1.8 kilometers (1.1 mi) west of Laguna de Bay coastline in Poblacion, Muntinlupa. It is in the eastern portion of the New Bilibid Prison Reservation, close to NBP Gate 1 at its boundary with Camella Homes Alabang IV-A and the Tensuan villages of Poblacion along the South Luzon Expressway. The lake lies just north of the Magdaong River, which flows down to the southern boundary of the reservation into Muntinlupa's border with Bacoor. It has no visible inlets or outlets. Its water level depends mainly on the groundwater level or precipitation amount.

Jamboree Lake is in a hilly area surrounded by trees and greenery, with a depressed garden, known simply as Sunken Garden, located immediately to the southwest. Near its southern edge is the Memorial Hill, which features an old Imperial Japanese cannon used during World War II, as well as a grotto of Our Lady of Lourdes and the grave of Major Eriberto Misa, the longest-serving director of New Bilibid Prison. The lake and its gardens are bounded by General Paulino Santos Avenue and Insular Prison Road. The main prison facility and maximum security compound are located 1 kilometer (0.62 mi) south of Jamboree Lake, at the southern end of General Paulino Santos Avenue.

The lake contains populations of tilapia and silver perch.

== History ==
Very little is known about the lake's origins besides the presence of a small replica of the Statue of Liberty that once stood in the middle of the lake in the 1940s. With the transfer of inmates from the Old Bilibid Prison (Bilibid Viejo or Cárcel y Presidio Correccional) in Santa Cruz, Manila, to this new facility in 1941, the lands surrounding the lake served as the prison's food production area. Early inmates from the Cordillera Administrative Region helped develop the area by building terraces along the lake's shoreline reminiscent of the rice terraces in their native Ifugao.

The lake was near where the first regular Masses were held in the 1950s before a permanent chapel to Our Lady of Mercy was built to serve prison employees and inmates. In 1955, the Statue of Liberty replica was replaced by that of Lady Justice, designed by former Bureau of Corrections officer Moses Saunar.

The lake was declared a "cultural and historical wealth" by the local government. It was placed under the jurisdiction and management of the Muntinlupa Cultural Affairs Office and Tourism Council in 1999.
