= Muntinlupa Sunken Garden =

Recreational Park in Muntinlupa City, the Philippines

Coordinates: 14°22′58″N 121°1′56″E

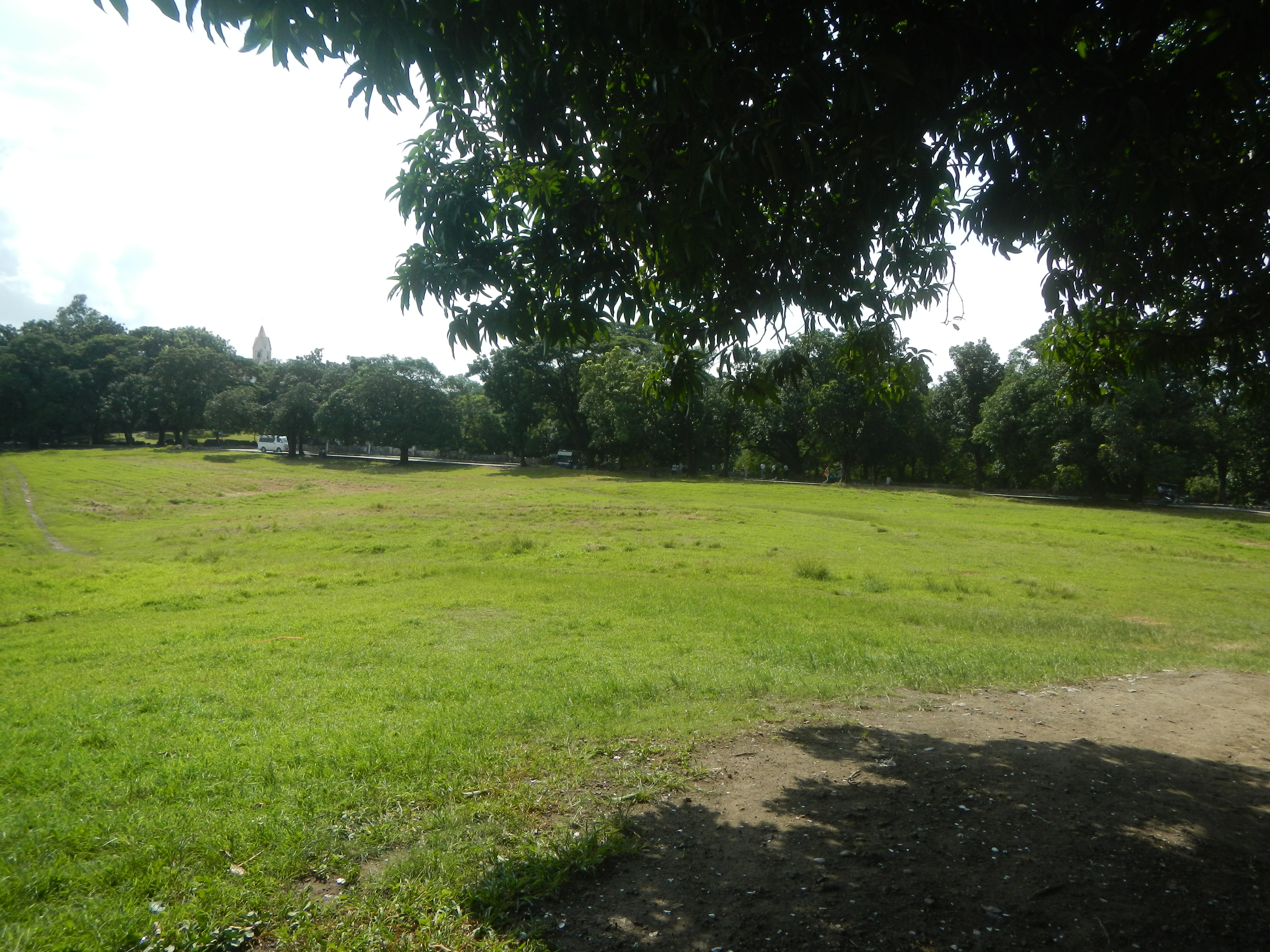
- View north from General Paulino Santos Avenue at the southwest corner of the Sunken Garden
- Interactive map of Muntinlupa Sunken Garden
- Type: Urban park
- Location: Muntinlupa, Philippines
- Area: 15.8 hectares (39 acres)
- Operator: Muntinlupa Environmental Protection and Natural Resources Office (EPNRO); Bureau of Corrections
- Status: Opened

The Muntinlupa Sunken Garden, also known as the New Bilibid Prison Sunken Garden and often shortened to simply Sunken Garden, is a large public urban park and a local government-protected zone located in Muntinlupa, Metro Manila, Philippines.

It is an open grassy space on the southern shore of Jamboree Lake that is lower than the surrounding elevation in the New Bilibid Prison Reservation. The park is under the joint operation and management of the City Government of Muntinlupa and the Bureau of Corrections.

== Description ==
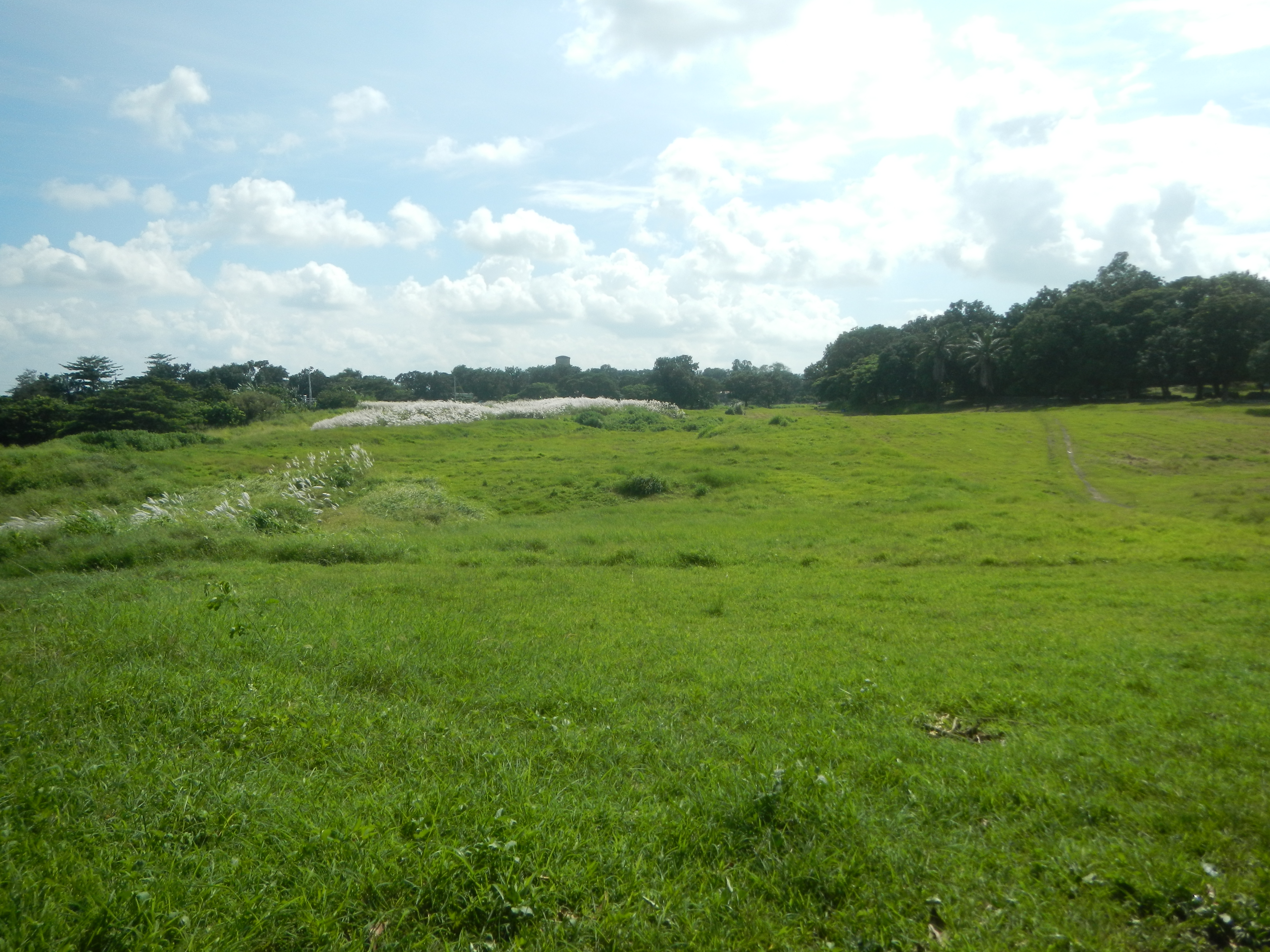
View towards the northern boundary of the Sunken Garden

The Muntinlupa Sunken Garden is in the central area of the Poblacion village at the eastern section of the 587-hectare (1,450-acre) prison reservation. It is an open grassland delineated by large canopy trees that serve as a buffer between New Bilibid Prison and the communities in east Poblacion. The roughly 15.8-hectare (39-acre) park borders Jamboree Lake to the north, with the main prison facility and maximum security compound at its southern end. It is bounded by General Paulino Santos Avenue to the south and west, with the main road leading in and out of the prison reservation known as Insular Prison Road, running along the park's northern boundary.

Within the park's bounds is Memorial Hill, a historical landmark on the northern side near Jamboree Lake. It contains a Marian grotto with a statue of Our Lady of Lourdes. Also in the vicinity is a Japanese vintage cannon used during World War II and a memorial to Major Eriberto Misa, the longest-serving director of the New Bilibid Prison. Across the park's central section on Insular Prison Road is the Our Lady of Mercy chapel, also known as Ina ng Awa Parish Church, which replaced the grotto at Memorial Hill, where regular masses were held in the early 1950s. The park also hosts a recreation camp with gazebos near the lake and extends into the western side of Insular Prison Road north of the chapel, the smaller New Bilibid Prisons Park.

A portion of the Sunken Garden was formerly used as a food production area for prison inmates and employees in the 1940s. In 2007, a portion of the Sunken Garden was declared a mini-forest park through Resolution No. 07-382, signed by Mayor Jaime R. Fresnedi. In 2015, perimeter lights were installed at the park around Jamboree Lake for ₱636,180. The construction of a pavilion and view deck at the lake was announced in 2017 by the local government as part of its economic and infrastructure development spending of ₱873 million for fiscal year 2018.

== Recreation ==
The Muntinlupa Sunken Garden is a popular recreational area for people living in the locality. In addition to serving as the main venue for events and ceremonies sponsored by the Bureau of Corrections, it hosts outdoor activities for locals and visitors, including fitness classes, fun runs, football and fishing. The MJRF Fishing Competition, initiated by Mayor Fresnedi in 2013, is an annual competition in Jamboree Lake. Students from nearby Itaas Elementary School also use the open spaces at the Sunken Garden for their yearly "Field Day" and regular open-air athletics. Nearby Muntinlupa National High School students also use the park for relaxation, recreation, and educational purposes.

In 2014, a resolution was approved allocating a portion of the Sunken Garden for constructing a modern football field. Since May 2015, the park has hosted free weekly outdoor cinema screenings by the lake sponsored by the Muntinlupa local government.

== Gallery ==
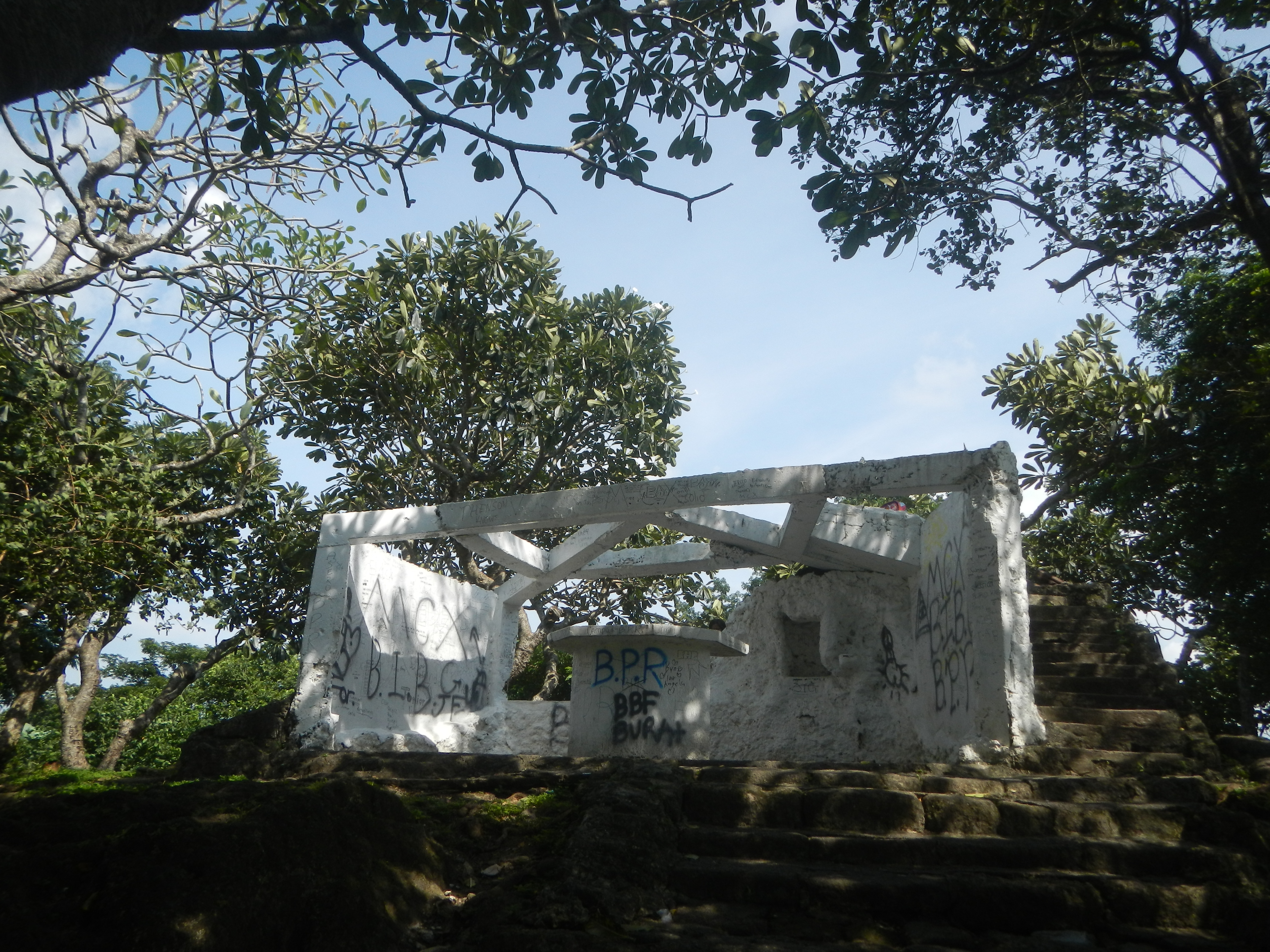
The grotto

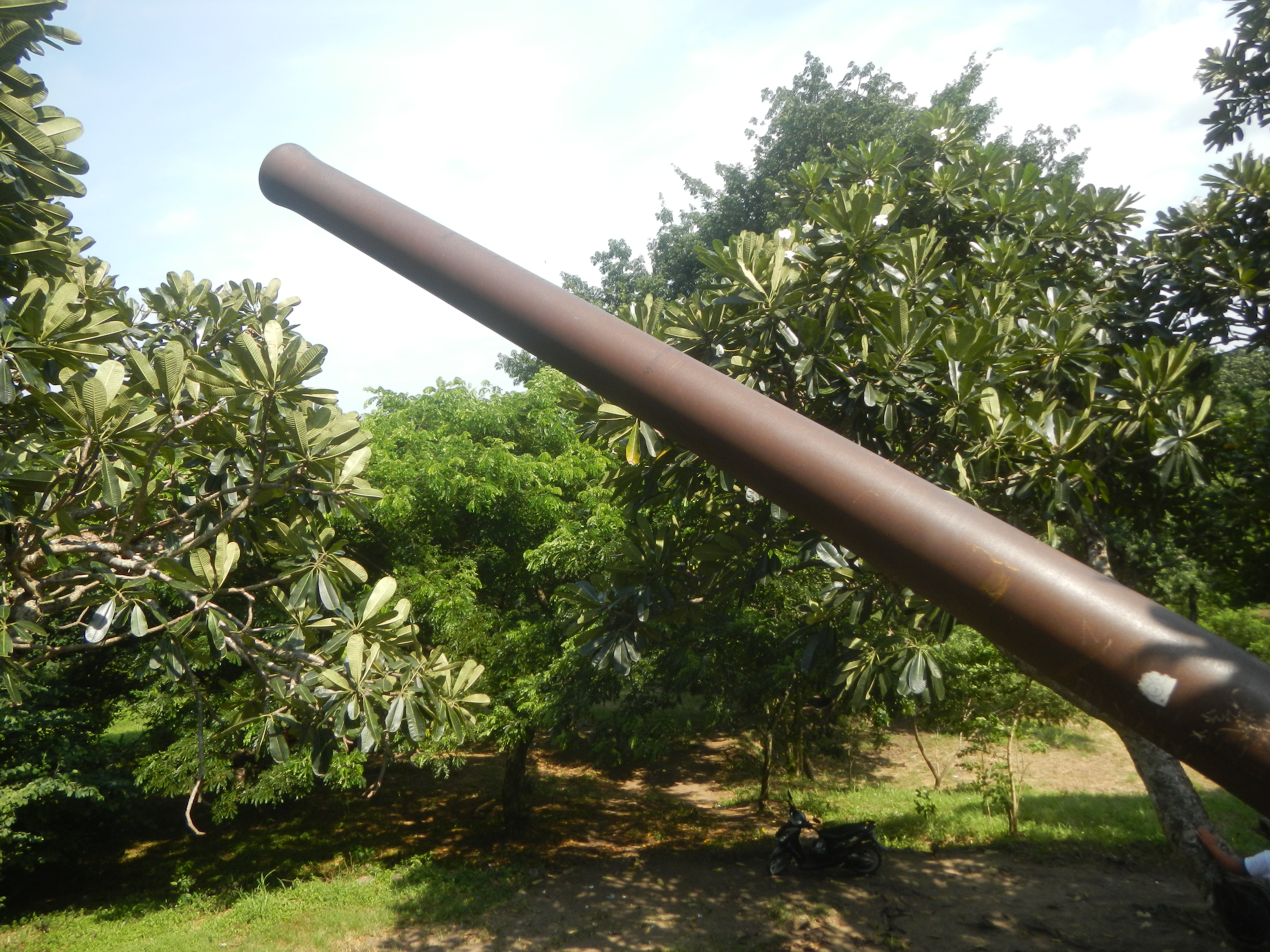
World War II-era Japanese cannon

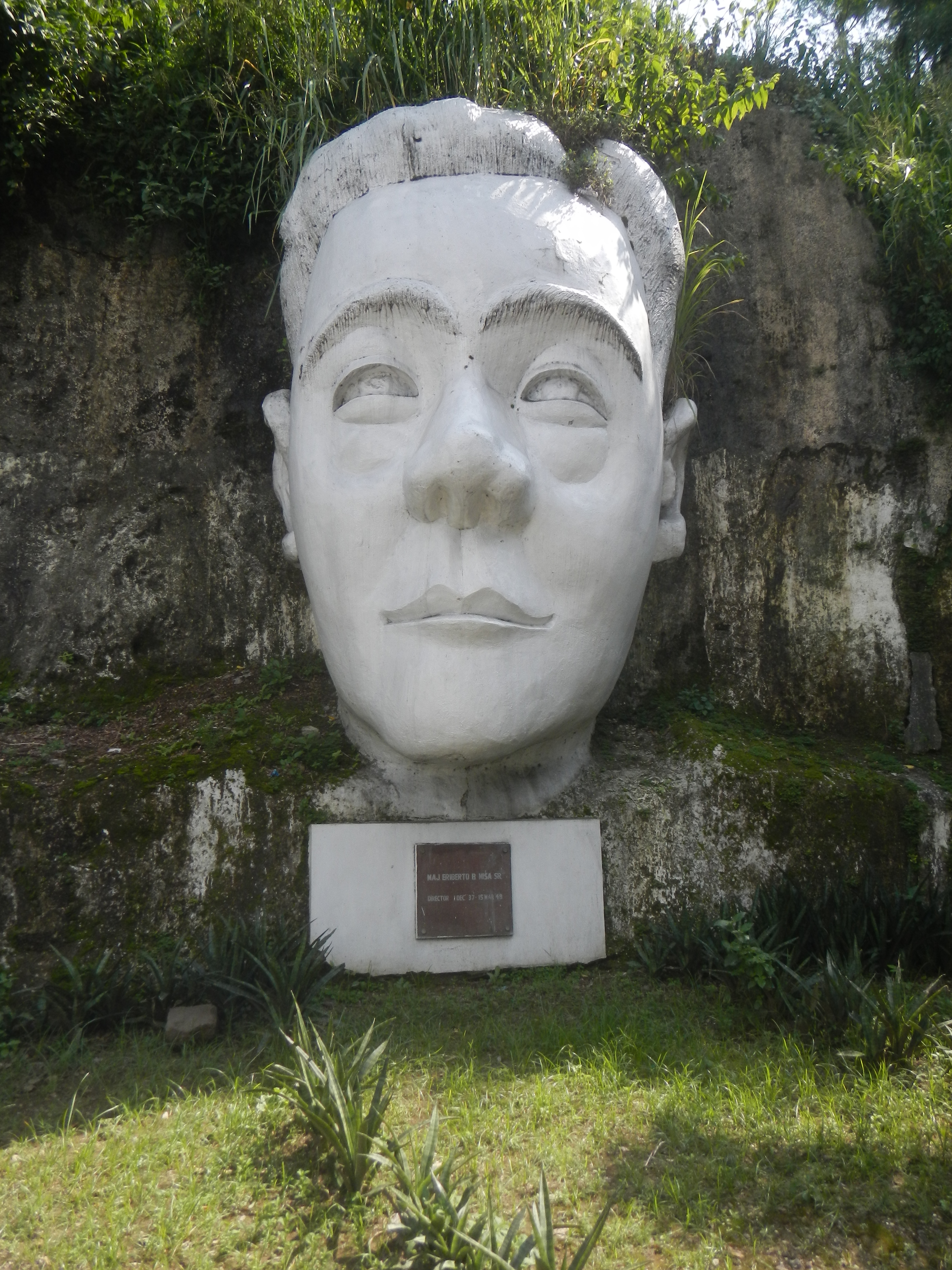
Eriberto Misa memorial at the Memorial Hill

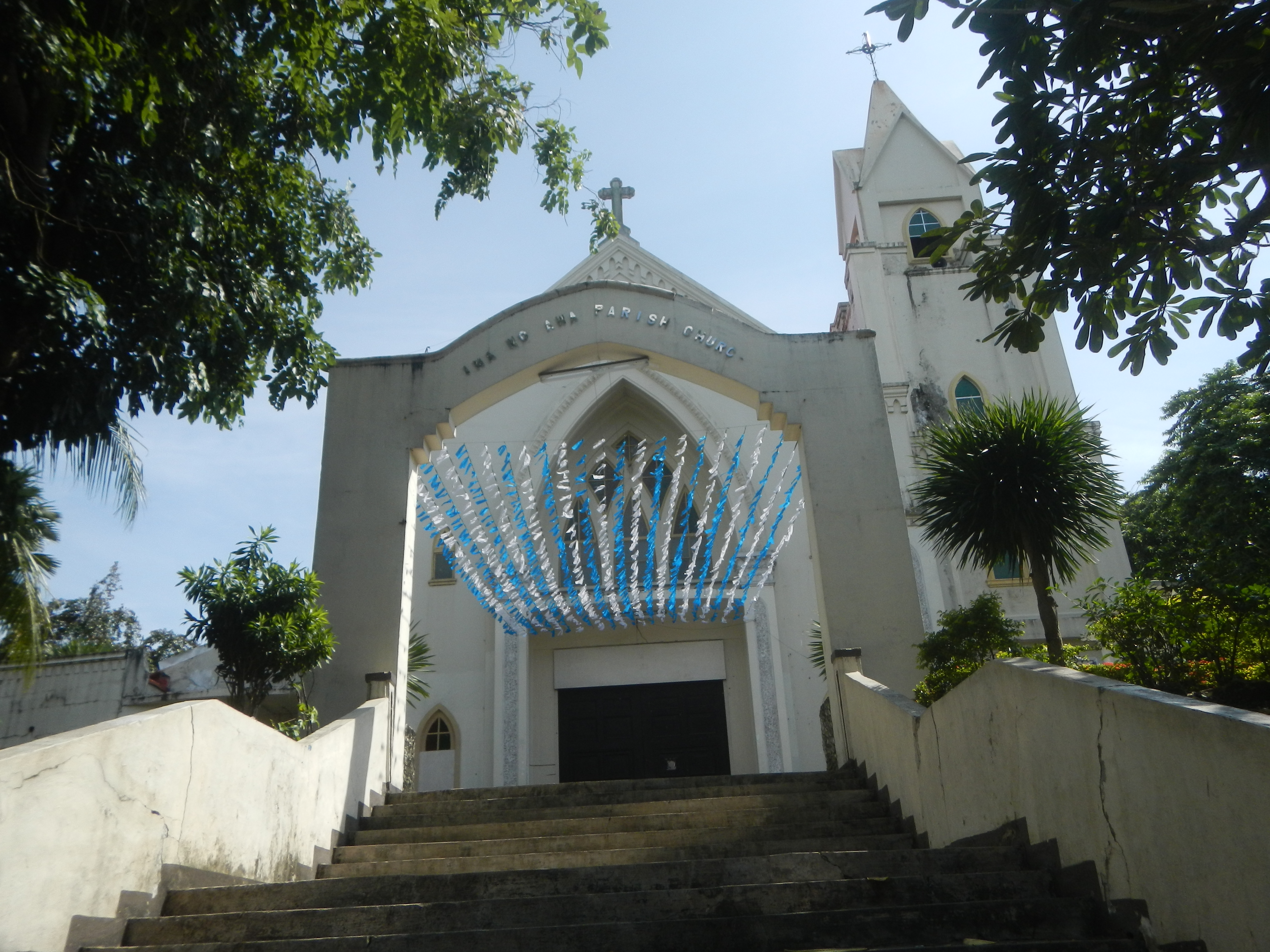
Our Lady of Mercy Parish Church adjacent to Sunken Garden

== See also ==
- List of parks in Metro Manila
