= Genyo e-Learning =

Online learning platform

- Website type: Educational technology
- Available in: English
- Owner: Diwa Learning Systems Inc.
- Website: www.genyo.com.ph
- Commercial: Yes
- Launched: 2004
- Current status: Active

Genyo e-Learning is an online learning platform developed by Diwa Learning Systems Inc. and launched in 2004. It provides digital educational resources for grades 1-10 across five core subjects, supporting both blended and fully online learning models. The platform includes curriculum-based content, online tutorials, and performance monitoring tools for the Philippine educational system. It has been adopted by various schools, becoming particularly prominent during the COVID-19 pandemic. Diwa Learning Systems Inc. provides training and technical support related to the system's implementation.

== History and development ==
Genyo e-Learning was launched in 2004 by Diwa Learning Systems Inc. with the stated goal of integrating Information and Communications Technology (ICT) into education. It has since expanded its functionality to support blended and fully online learning environments. Diwa Learning Systems Inc. conducts webinars and face-to-face training programs for educators, students, and parents on the use of the platform. The company employs Learning Integration Specialists (LIS) to assist schools with technical and implementation issues.

=== Implementation and impact ===
Genyo e-Learning has been adopted by schools across the Philippines. Malate Catholic School has utilized Genyo for its hybrid learning program since 2012, integrating face-to-face and online learning activities. During the COVID-19 pandemic, the platform was used by schools, such as Divine Light Academy in Bacoor, Cavite, and Our Lady of Lourdes School of Bauan in Bauan, Batangas to transition their educational programs to online learning.

== Features ==
The platform includes curriculum-based content in Science, Mathematics, English, Filipino, and Araling Panlipunan. This content includes interactive multimedia elements, online tutorials, and performance-tracking tools for students and teachers.
