= Tunasan River =

River in Luzon, Philippines

Tunasan River Tunasan-Cuyab River
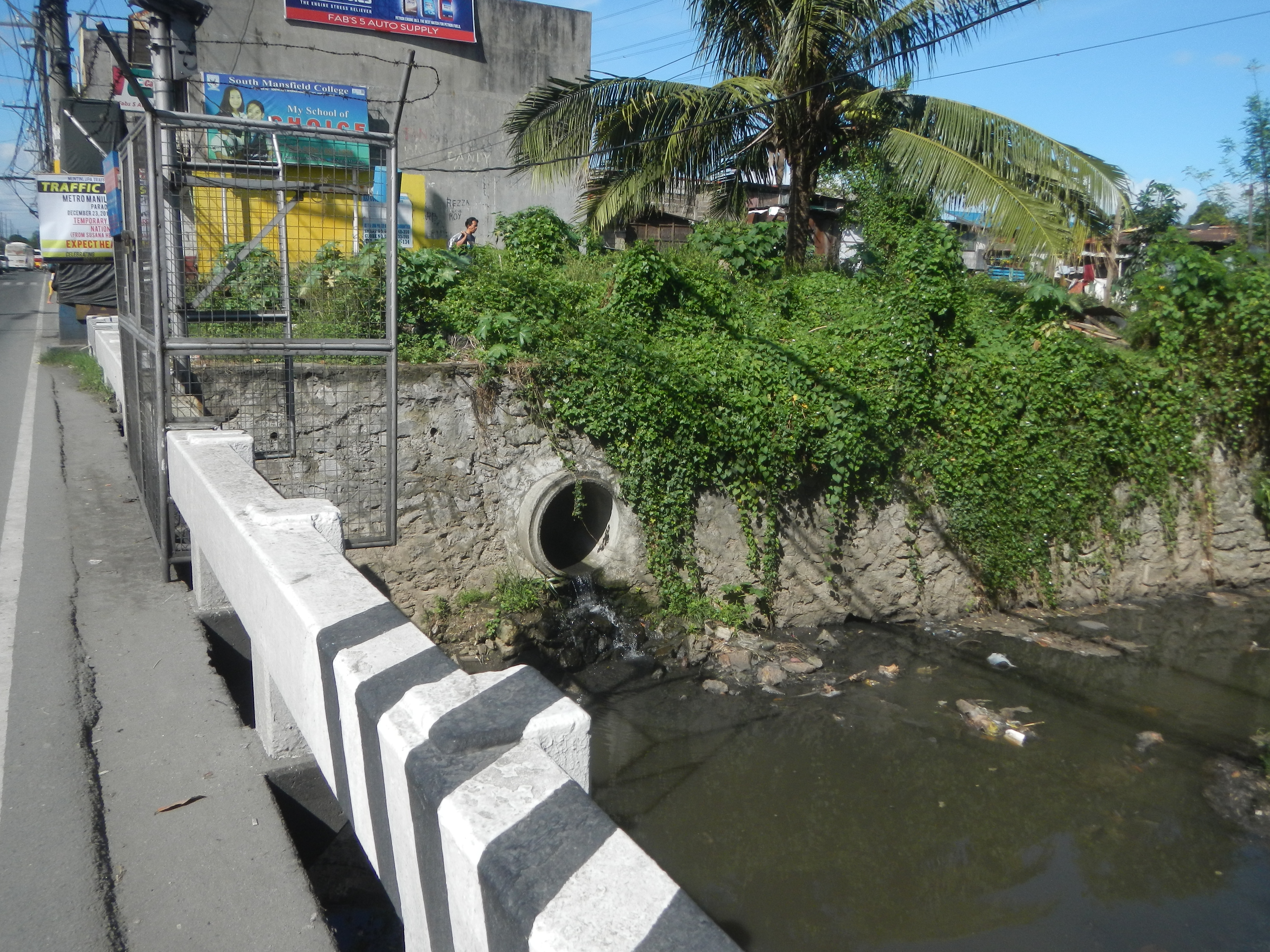
- The river demarcating the boundary between Muntinlupa and Laguna

- Location within Luzon Location within Philippines

Location
- Country: Philippines
- Region: Calabarzon; National Capital Region
- Province: Cavite; Laguna

Physical characteristics
- Source: Dasmariñas, Cavite
- Mouth: western lobe of Laguna de Bay
  - coordinates: 14°22′49″N 121°03′30″E
  - elevation: less than 2 meters (6.6 ft) above sea level
- Length: 9 km (5.6 mi)

The Tunasan River (Tagalog: Ilog ng Tunasan), also referred to as the Tunasan–Cuyab River, is a river system in the Philippines. The river begins at the border of San Pedro, Laguna and Dasmariñas, Cavite, and ends 9 kilometers (5.6 mi) at the border of San Pedro and Muntinlupa, Metro Manila. It is one of 21 major tributaries of Laguna de Bay.

The river system has six adjoining creeks: one in San Pedro, Laguna; one in Dasmariñas, Cavite; three from the ponds inside Hallow Ridge Filipinas Golf in San Pedro; and one from the drainage system of the RMT Complex in Muntinlupa.

The depth of the Tunasan River currently varies from 0.25 to 2 meters (9.8 in to 6 ft 6.7 in).

Both the river and barangay of Tunasan were named after a medicinal plant locally called tunas (Nymphaea nouchali), which was once abundant on the river and the shoreline of Laguna de Bay.

The Tunasan River received media attention in 1994 and 1995 due to a series of "fish kills" caused by high biochemical oxygen demand from decomposing water lilies and the profusion of residential waste filling the river during the rainy season.

== See also ==
- Laguna Lake Development Authority
- List of rivers and estuaries in Metro Manila
