= Pedro E. Diaz High School =

- Muntinlupa, Metro Manila; Philippines

Information
- Type: Public High School
- Established: March 21, 1977 (as Muntinlupa Municipal High School) 1980 (as PEDHS)
- Principal: Antonio B. Rocha

Pedro E. Diaz High School or simply PEDHS is a public secondary school in the Philippines. It is situated in U.P. Side Subdivision, Alabang, Muntinlupa.

== History ==
Pedro E. Diaz High School was first known as Annex of Fort Bonifacio College (FBC) situated at Soldiers Hills Village, Putatan, City of Muntinlupa. Due to Financial and Administrative problems, in February, 1980, the PTA passed the resolution converting the school into Muntinlupa Municipal High School into Pedro E. Diaz High School, which the late Mayor Maximiano Argana and the School Division Superintendent Bienvenido Espiritu approved.

Again, on December 2, 1991, Muntinlupa Mayor Ignacio R. Bunye and the Sangguniang Bayan member signed Resolution No. 91-233 renaming Muntinlupa Municipal High School into Pedro E. Diaz High School in honor and tribute to Hon. Pedro Espeleta Diaz, a former Mayor of his town, who was brutally killed by the Japanese during his term in defense of his townmates.

== Disaster and Risk Reduction Management ==
The school's "Batang Emergency Response Team" (BERT) won several awards at the regional level from the DRRM.

A school building was abandoned due to it being above the Marikina Valley Fault System.

== See also ==
- List of schools in Muntinlupa
