= Santa Teresa College =

Roman Catholic college in Batangas, Philippines

Sta. Teresa College
- Motto: "Always for Jesus"
- Type: Private Sectarian
- Established: 1940
- Affiliations: Roman Catholic
- Academic affiliations: Unified Schools of the Archdiocese of Lipa; Lipa Archdiocesan Schools Association Inc.; Philippine Accrediting Association of Schools, Colleges and Universities; Catholic Educational Association of the Philippines; National Alliance of Private Schools Philippines Inc.; International Society for Technology in Educations; Private Education Assistance Committee
- President: Rev. Fr. Carlo Magno Ilagan
- Principal: Violeta Ramos
- Dean: Randy M Baja
- Location: Bauan, Batangas, Philippines; 13°45′10.52″N 121°03′30.46″E
- Hymn: Teresian Hymn
- Colors: Green & yellow
- Nickname: STC Crusaders
- Sporting affiliations: USCAA, PRISAA, PRISAB
- Mascots: Lorenzo and Teresa
- Website: www.stc-bauan.edu.ph
- Location in Luzon Location in the Philippines

Sta. Teresa College, formerly known as St. Theresa's Academy and Colegio de Santa Teresa de Jesus and often abbreviated as "STC", is a Catholic education institution founded in 1920 and established by the Franciscan Sisters in 1940. Its main campus is located at Kapitan Ponso Street, Bauan, Batangas, Philippines. To date, STC is one of the oldest Catholic Schools within the jurisdiction of the Archdiocese of Lipa.

== History ==
The first classes were held in nipa huts run by the Sisters of the Good Shepherd (RGS) nuns during the 1940s. Due to World War II, STA was forced to close as it was too dangerous to hold classes. When it re-opened after the Philippine Liberation, the RGS nuns turned over the school to the Archdiocese of Lipa.

Reverend Father Conrado G. Castillo served as the director from 1984 to 1994 and as the first college president from 1994 to 2004. After his term, Reverend Father Carlo Magno C. Ilagan took over the presidency, and from 2004 to 2015, he initiated reforms and school development programs that included the opening of a tertiary school and the building of classrooms and offices.

== Facilities ==
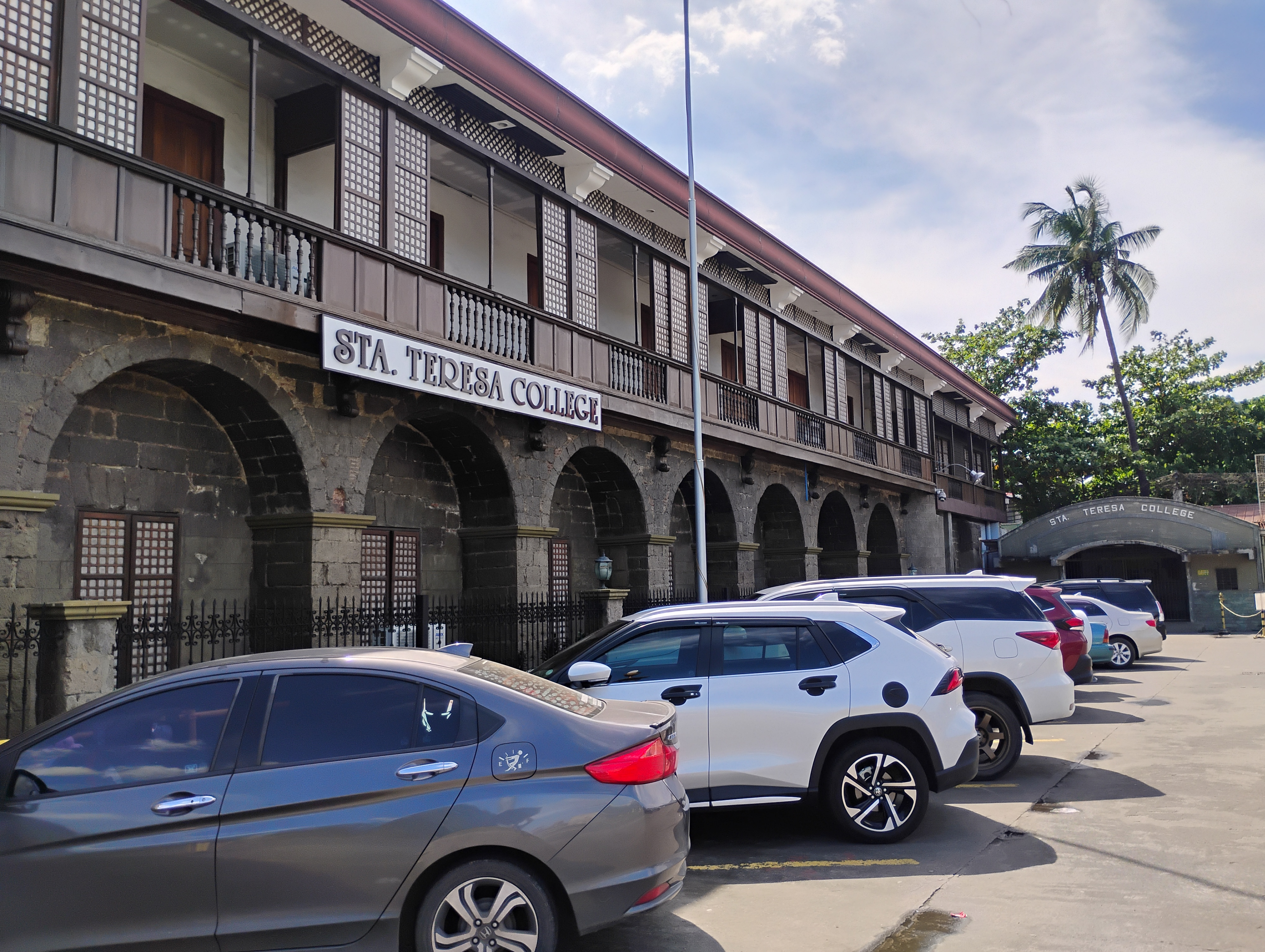
Santa Teresa College beside the Bauan Church

The school uses a RFID Attendance Monitoring System to ensure the security of its students. The school also has a Learning Management System wherein the student use iPad or tablets to store copies of their textbooks in the form of e-books. Quizzes and surveys are completed using tablets which do not require paper and pen.

- Grade School Department

The Grade School Department is a two-floor building.

- High School Department

The High School Department is composed of four buildings.

- College Department

The College Department is a four-floor building with a basement rooms and facilities in addition.

- Canteen

The Main School Canteen serves the Grade School, High School, and College Departments. The Preparatory Department has its own cafeteria.

- STC Gymnasium

STC has 2 gymnasiums, dedicated to San Lorenzo Ruiz and San Pedro Calungsod. The gymnasiums are primarily used for provincial, city or school competitions, sports and entertainment. Different programs are also held here like intramural sports, Family Day, etc.

- Function Hall

STC has 3 function halls. The largest hall is used for large groups of students or major functions, another is located beside the school chapel and a third hall is located near Gate 3 of the Grade School Department.

== Publications ==
The college's publication is The Leaf, and it has three editions, namely, Kiddie, Campus and College Editions.

== Officials ==
In 2015, there was a significant change in the set of officials of the school's administration. Due to the reshuffling of priests in Batangas, Fr. Carlo Ilagan left his position as the school's president for his new assignment as the parish priest of Invencion de la Sta. Cruz Parish in Alitagtag, Batangas. Apparently, Fr. Ricardo Panganiban was appointed as the Unified Schools of the Archdiocese of Lipa and STC's new president. Dr. Randy M. Baja was appointed as the College Dean and Vice President for Academics, while Fr. Mike Samaniego was named as vice president for Finance and Administrative Services. USAL schools are required to have only one principal and one Chief Operating Officer (COO). For Sta. Teresa College, Mr. Aurelio Manalo Jr. was appointed as COO and Mrs. Violeta Ramos was appointed as the school's principal, respectively.

In 2019, Fr. Carlo Ilagan returned as the President for STC. On his return, the school had a ceremony at the San Lorenzo Ruiz Hall.

- Rev. Fr. Carlo Magno Ilagan - President
- Rev. Fr. Mike Samaniego - Finance
- Mr. Aurelio Manalo Jr. - Chief Operating Officer
- Dr. Randy Baja - College Dean
- Dr. Violeta Ramos - Basic Education Department Principal
