= Muntinlupa Science High School =

Public high school in Muntinlupa, Philippines

- Mataas na Paaralang Pang-Agham ng Muntinlupa (Filipino)

Location
- 999 Buendia St., Tunasan, Muntinlupa; Philippines
- Coordinates: 14°23′03″N 121°03′07″E

Information
- Other names: Muntinlupa Science or MunSci
- Type: Public
- Established: 1998; 28 years ago
- Principal: Dr. Ador B. Querubin
- Grades: 7 to 12
- Newspaper: Ang Matyag (Filipino); The Monitor (English)

Muntinlupa Science High School, known as Muntinlupa Science or MunSci, is a special science public high school in the City of Muntinlupa, Philippines that provides a technical and science curriculum that aims to prepare students for careers in science and technology, math, and communication arts.

== History ==
The Division of City Schools of Muntinlupa, with local government officials, residents and students jointly initiated a request to the DECS for the establishment of a school. After the DECS approved the request on April 15, 1999, a Selection Admission Test was administered to 126 student applicants on April 26. The top 72 students composed the batch who were the first to graduate from what would eventually be known as Muntinlupa Science High School.

On June 1, 1998, the school was inaugurated.

After a year at Itaas Elementary School, a three-storey building at 999 Buendia St., Tunasan was inaugurated on June 4, 1999 by city officials headed by former Mayor Jaime R. Fresnedi and DSS Dr. Alma Bella O. Bautista; the DECS office was represented by Dr. Fe Hidalgo. A three-storey building housing the administration office, clinic, guidance counselor|guidance services, library, computer room and two first year classes stands with its back against Laguna de Bay.

On April 1, 2002, the school graduated its first batch of seniors who hold the distinction of having generated the high percentage of UPCAT passers at 64%. During this year under the efforts of Carmen Rodriguez, principal, the first batch of permanent teachers of Muntinlupa Science High School was approved by the Department Of Education.

== Sections ==
There were 42 sections overall from Grade 7 to Grade 12 in MSHS for the School Year 2019 - 2020.

== Student activities ==
=== The Muntinlupa Science High School Chorale ===
The school's choir is Muntinlupa Science High School (MSHS) chorale. The chorale joined choir competitions like the Voices in Harmony (2006) and Ang Aming Munting Handog chorale festival where they achieved the Grand Champion spot on December 6, 2008. They took the first runner up spot in 2006 and 2007. They also joined MUSIKAPELLA where they won second runner up (2007 and 2008) and Best in Choice Piece (2008), Rotary Club Manila (2007) where they won first runner up, and SM malls singing makabayan choir competition where they were hailed Grand Champions.

The MSHS chorale took third place in the NAMCYA 2008 choir category making them one of the best youth choirs in the National Capital Region. In 2010 they become the champion in MCL show choir competition, Hallmark Music and Memories Chorale Competition and Voices In Harmony 2010. In 2012, they were hailed Grand Champion in the 1st Xinghai Prize International Choir Championships held in Guangzhou, China. Subsequently, they took the first place in Voices in Harmony 2012.

=== MSHS Rondalla ===
In 2005, with the guidance of Ivy Rose B. Casiguran, the Rondalla Group was formed. Shierly Protacio of II - Evans was the first president.

In 2007, with the guidance of music teacher Shellah Y. Doniza, the MSHS Rondalla was established. Catherine de Guzman of III - Fahrenheit (2007–08) was the first to be elected as the president and helds the presidency for two consecutive years followed by Sarah Jane dela Cruz of IV - Priestley (2009–10), Kathleen Lopena of IV - Pascal (2010–11), Elsbeth Nacino of IV - Pasteur (2011–12), Angela Borlongan of IV - Pasteur (2012–13), and Ferdinand Bundoc of IV - Pythagoras (2013–14).

They participated in the 2007 NAMCYA Rondalla High School category and reached the regional level with the pieces Maynila (Obertura) and Bakas ng Kahapon held at the University of the Philippines - Diliman, competing with seven other rondalla groups in the National Capital Region. In December 2011, the group represented the Philippines in the International Children's Arts and Culture Festival held in Kuala Lumpur, Malaysia. Local and school occasions were attended by the group since its establishment. Despite the young age of the group, they brought excellence and dignity in the alma mater. The ensemble is known for its members who arrange the pieces played by the group. They consist of bandurria players, octavina players, laud players, guitarists, two bassists and a drummer.

In the school year 2013-2014, the ensemble will take their chance again to compete in the prestigious NAMCYA for the rondalla group category.

== Clubs and organizations ==
The Supreme Student Government or SSG is the highest governing student body in the campus. The officers are elected every year.
