= Museo ng Muntinlupa =

History museum in Muntinlupa, Philippines

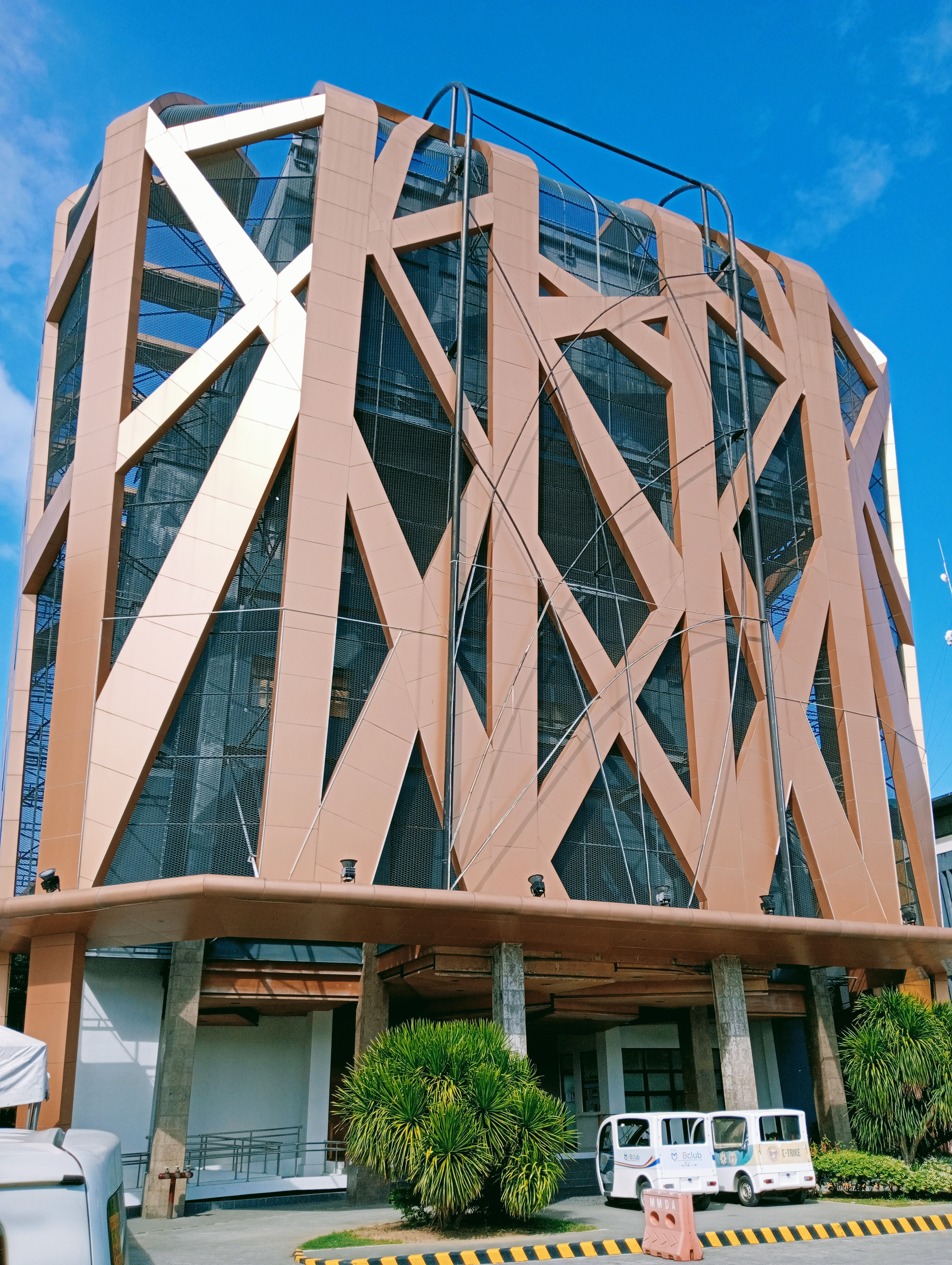
- Established: March 1, 2019
- Location: Centennial Avenue, Tunasan, Muntinlupa, Metro Manila, Philippines
- Coordinates: 14°23′16″N 121°02′47″E
- Type: History city museum
- Owner: Muntinlupa city government
- Building details
- Location in Metro Manila Location in Luzon Location in the Philippines

General information
- Status: Completed
- Groundbreaking: April 25, 2017
- Inaugurated: March 1, 2019
- Cost: ₱180 million

Technical details
- Floor count: 5
- Grounds: 3,000 m^{2} (32,000 sq ft)

Design and construction
- Architect: Beaudon Causapin

The Museo ng Muntinlupa (lit. 'Museum of Muntinlupa') is a history local museum along Centennial Avenue, Tunasan in Muntinlupa, Metro Manila, Philippines.

== Construction ==
The construction of the Museo ng Muntinlupa commenced on April 25, 2017, with an allotted budget of ₱180 million by the city government. It was initially projected to be finished within a year in time for the centennial celebration of Muntinlupa on December 19, but it was completed within almost two years. It was opened to the public on March 1, 2019, coinciding with Muntinlupa's 24th founding anniversary as a city.

== Architecture ==
The museum stands on a 3,000 m^{2} (32,000 sq ft) land. It was designed by Beaudon Causapin, the City Architect of Muntinlupa. The building's façade design was based on the salakab, a traditional fishing trap made from weaved bamboo sticks and fasted by rattan rope often used by fishers working in Laguna de Bay, as a tribute to Muntinlupa's fishing industry, which is a major part of the city's economy. The Museo ng Muntinlupa stands five storeys high. The ochre columns and wire netting were devised to manage the building's temperature by absorbing and deflecting heat.

== Facilities ==
The museum hosts a main gallery, a mayor's hall, an interactive science centre, and a theatre with 200 people seating capacity. It features exhibits featuring the city's history from the precolonial era until the modern period. It also features works of the city's contemporary artists and temporary exhibitions.

== Gallery ==
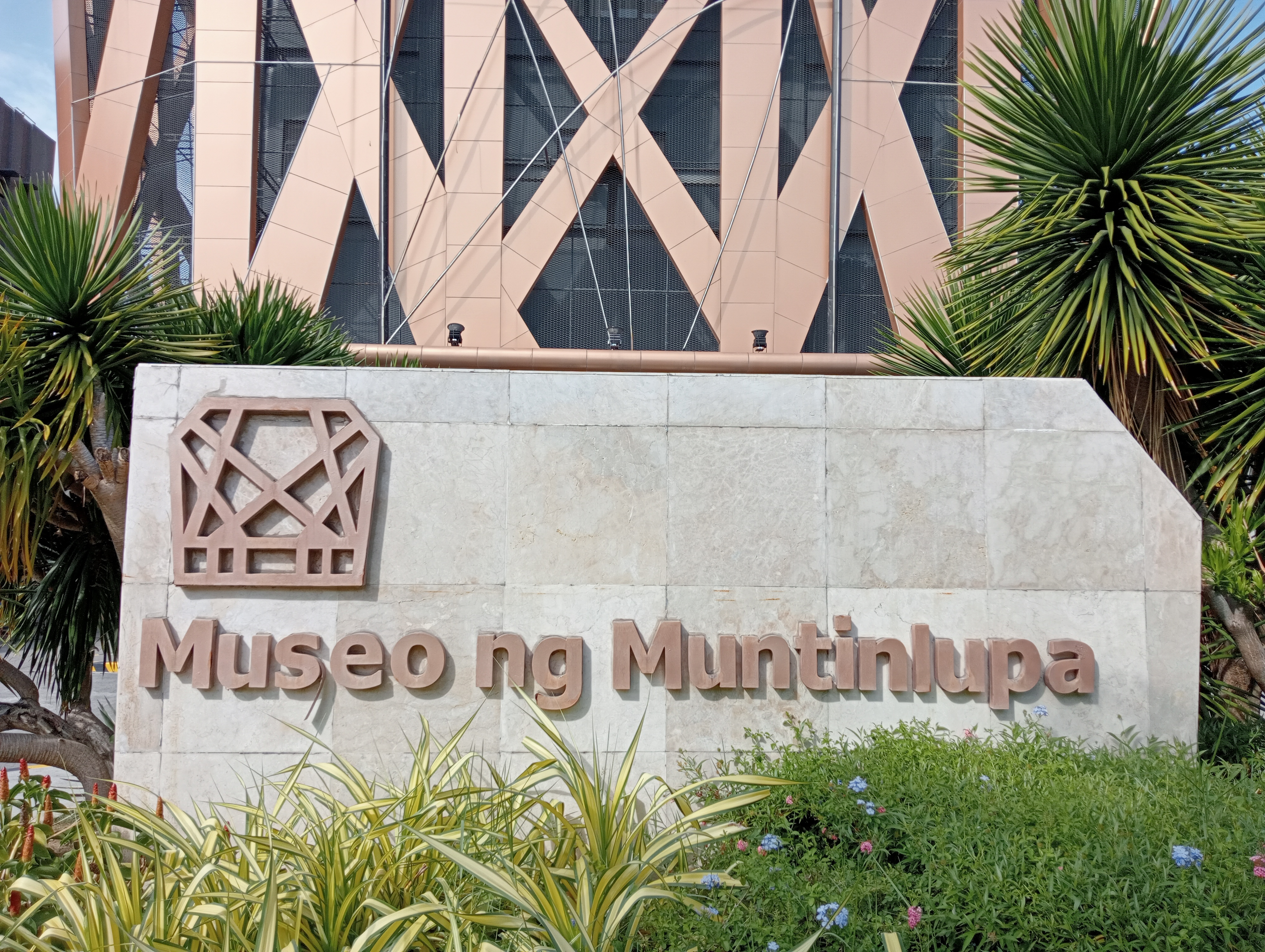
Welcome logo

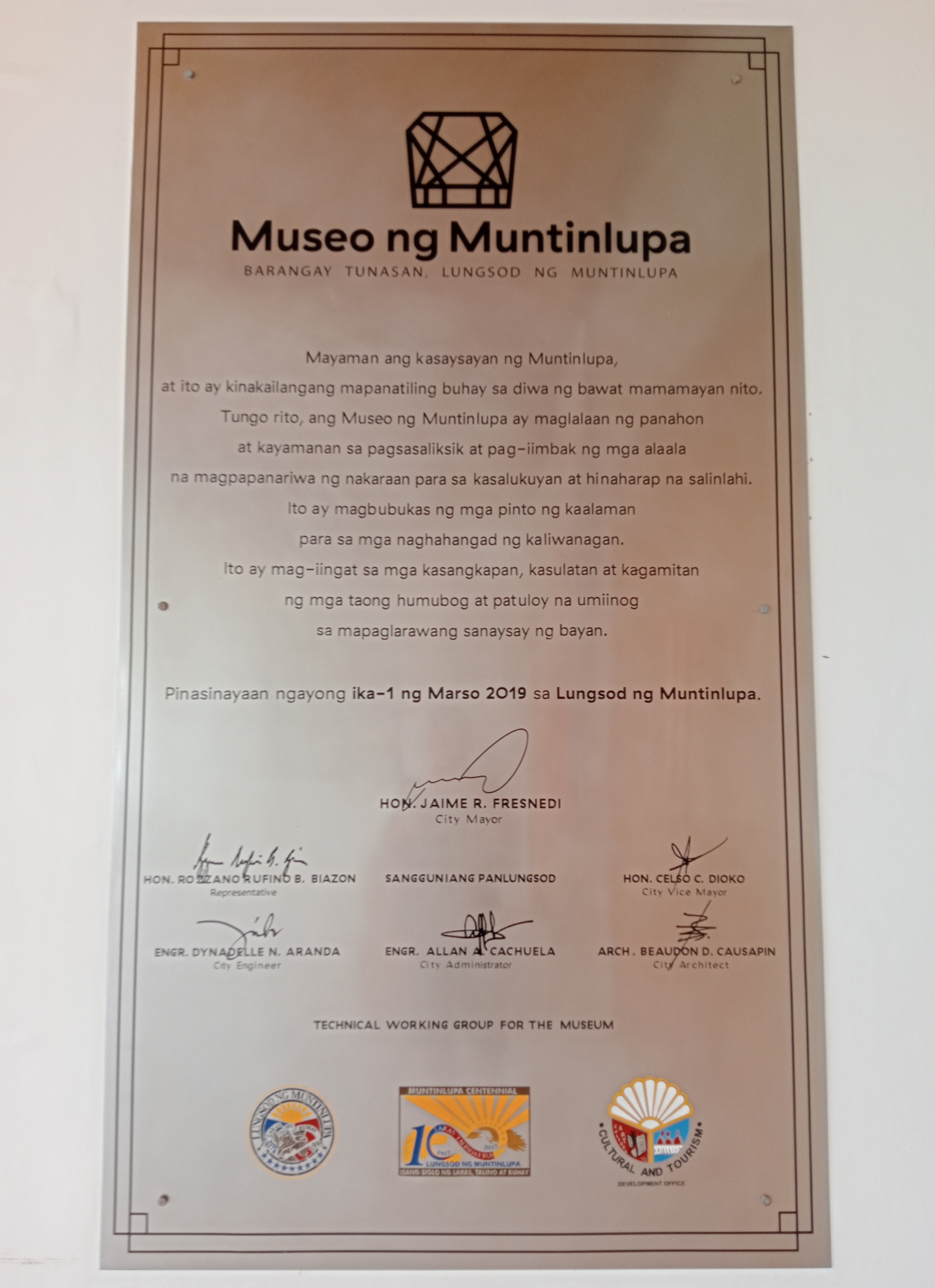
Museum marker
