= Muntinlupa =

Highly urbanized city in southern Metro Manila, Philippines

- Highly urbanized city
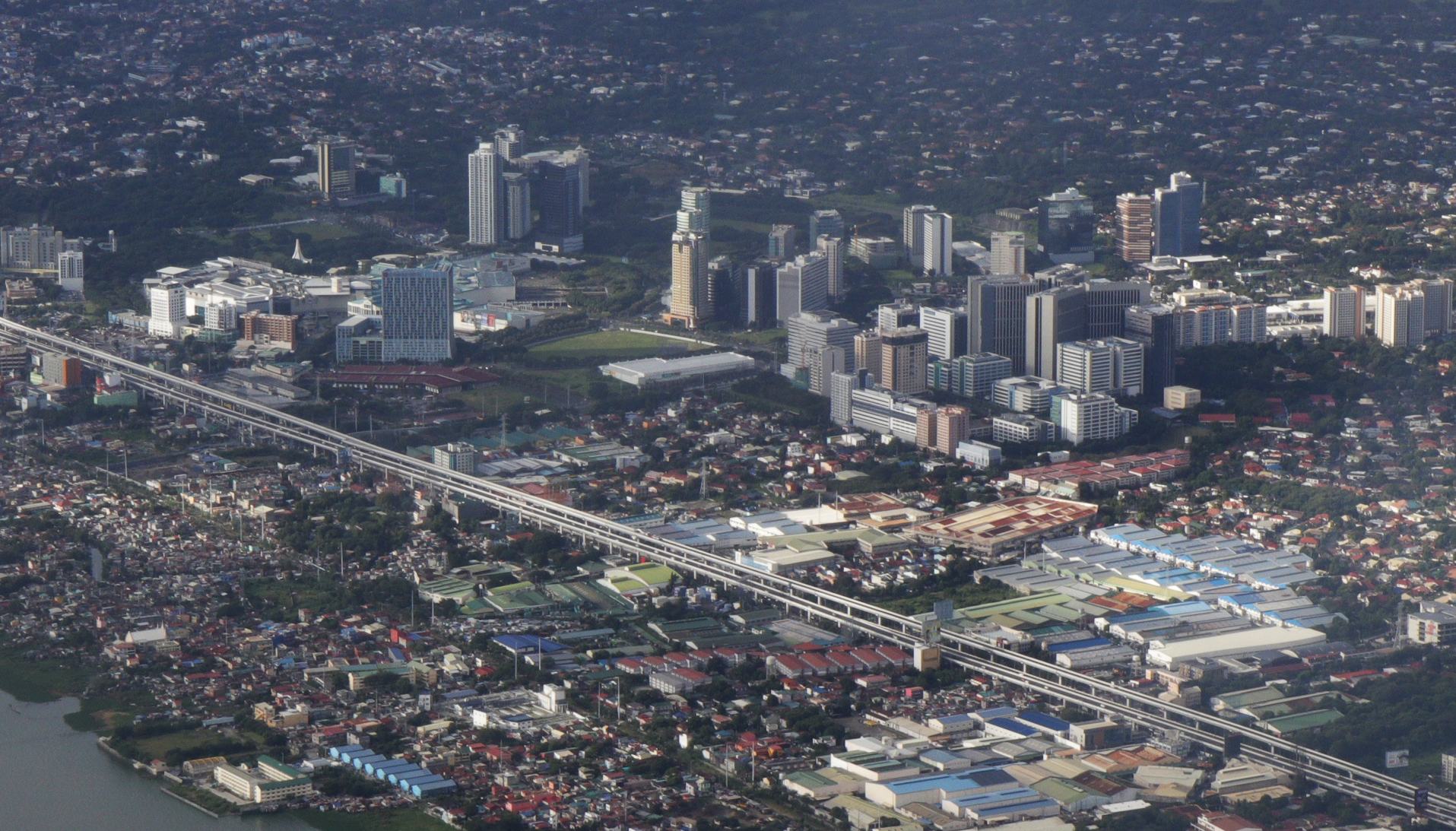
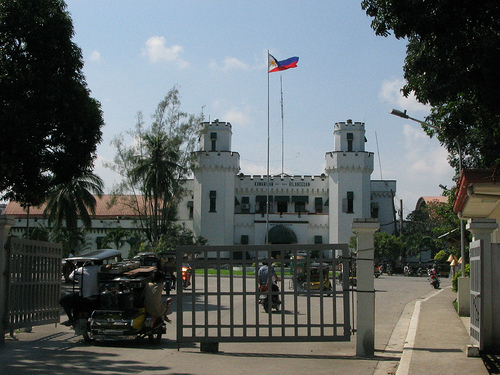
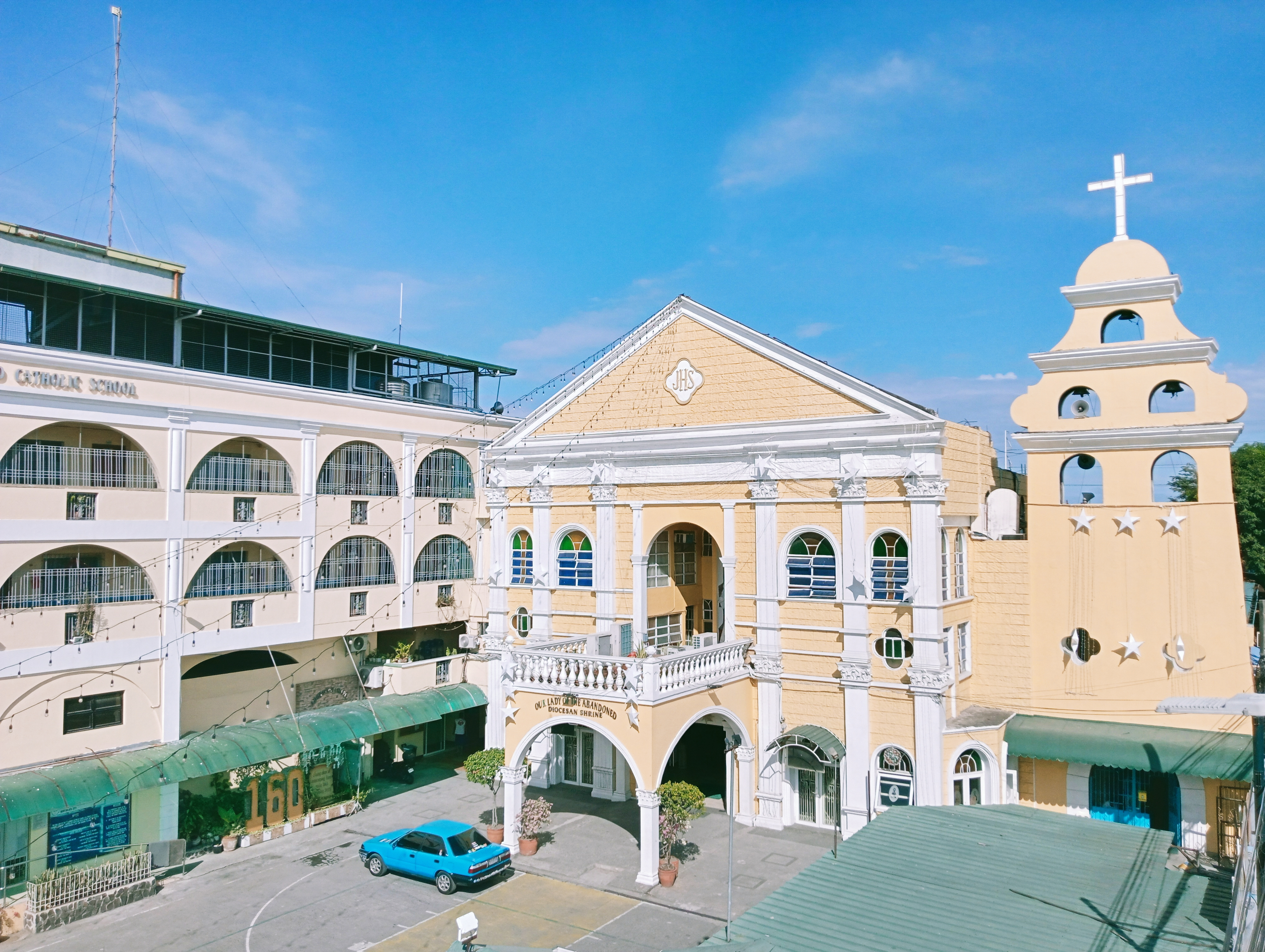
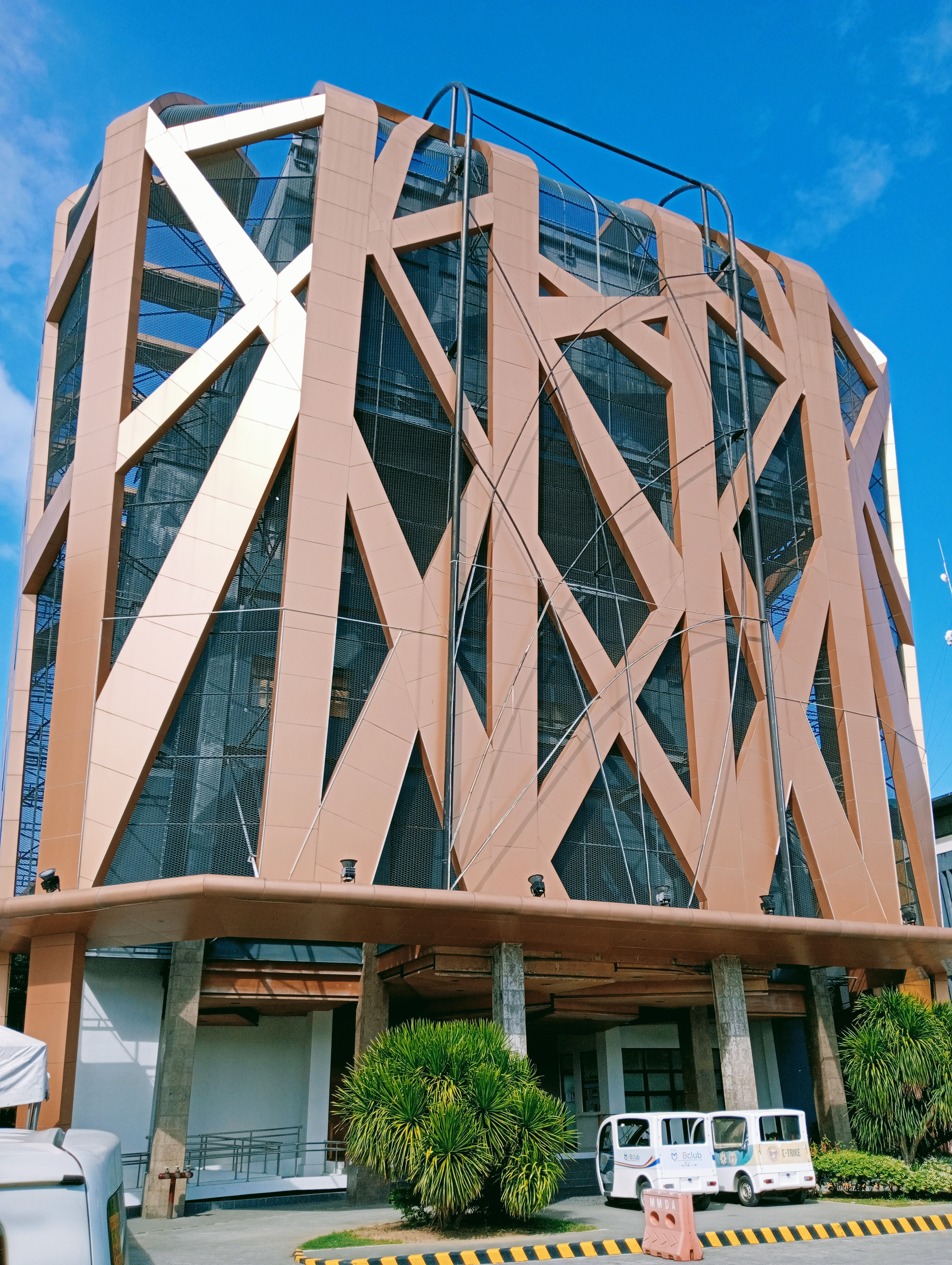
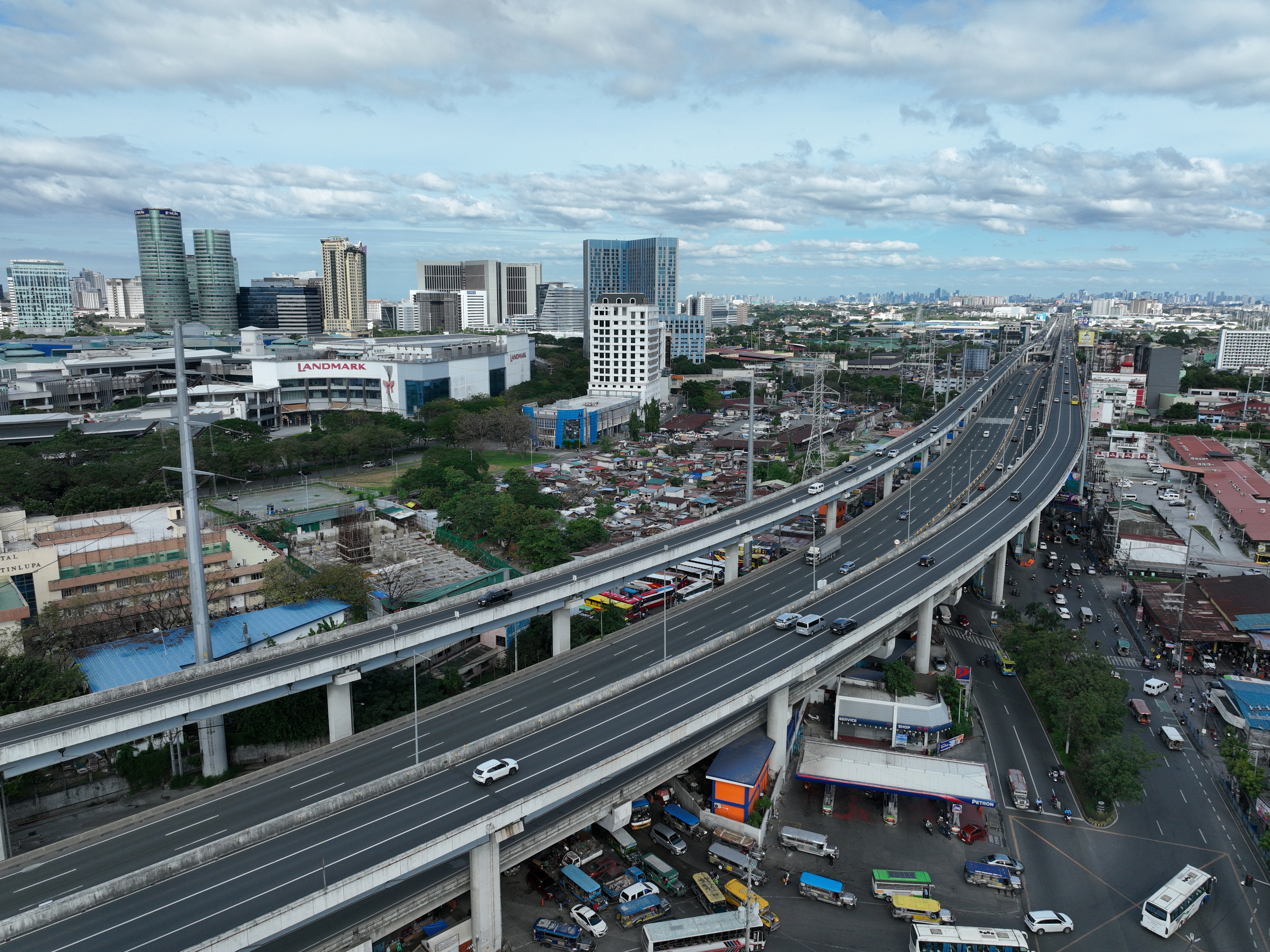
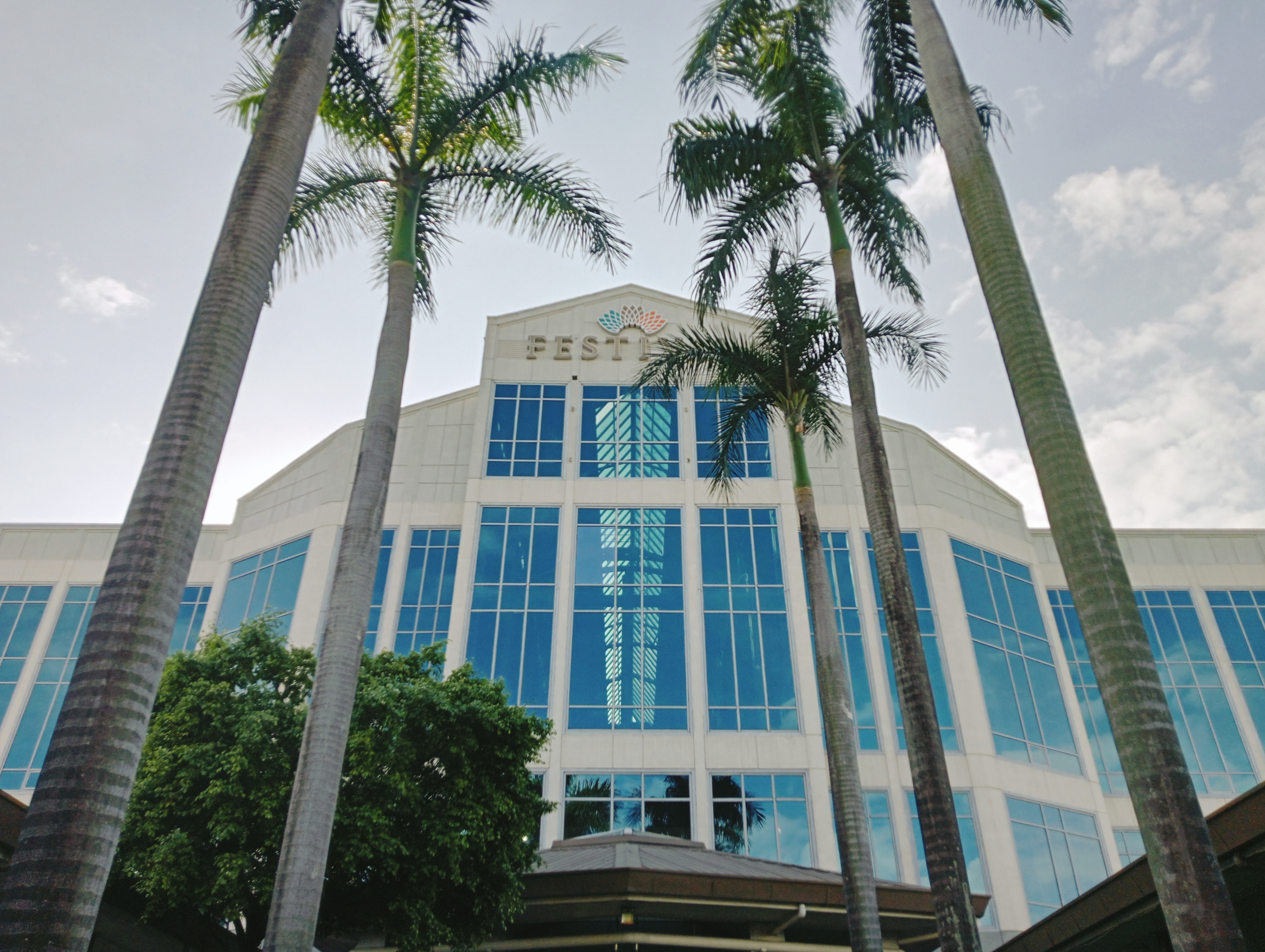
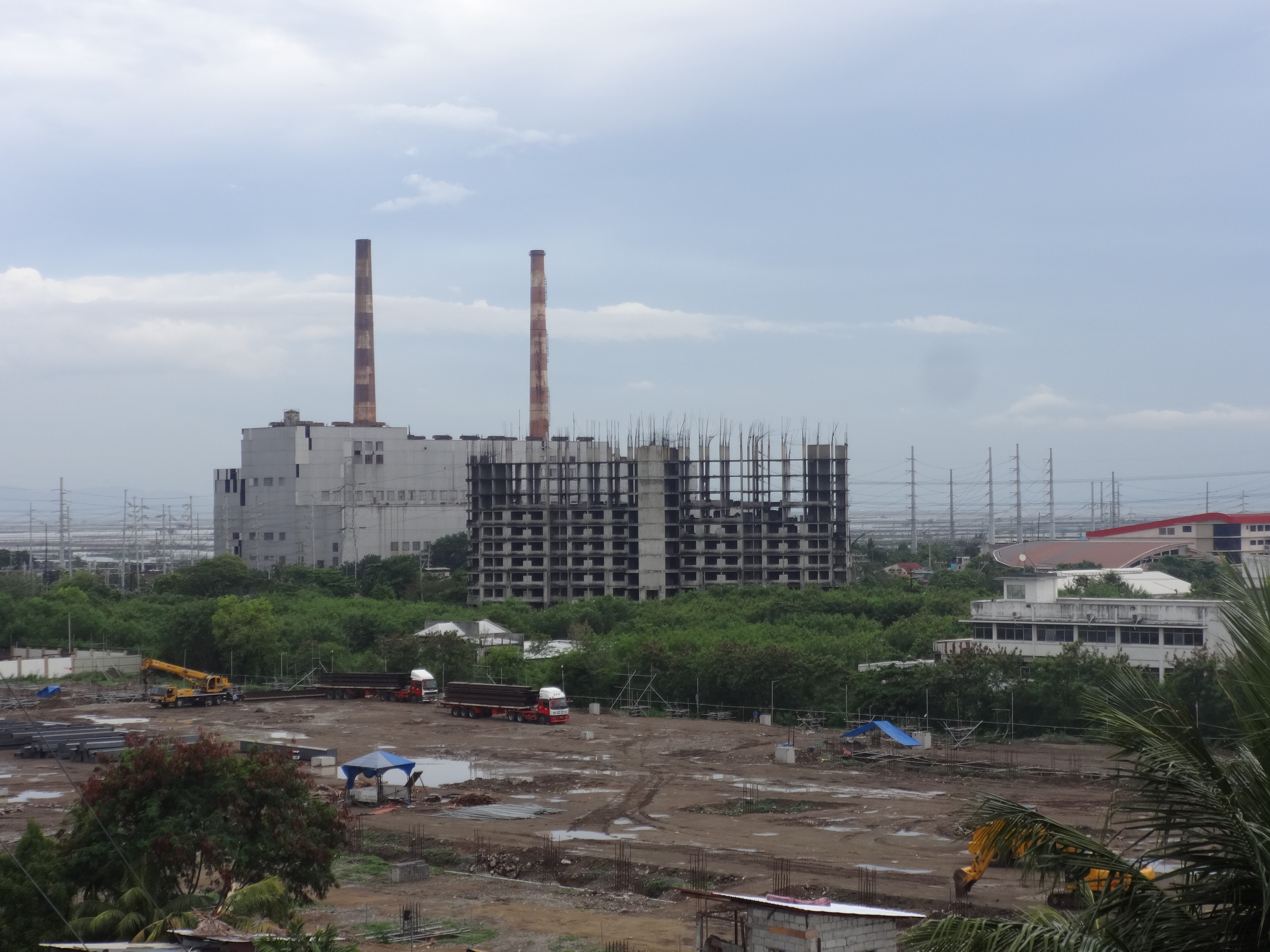
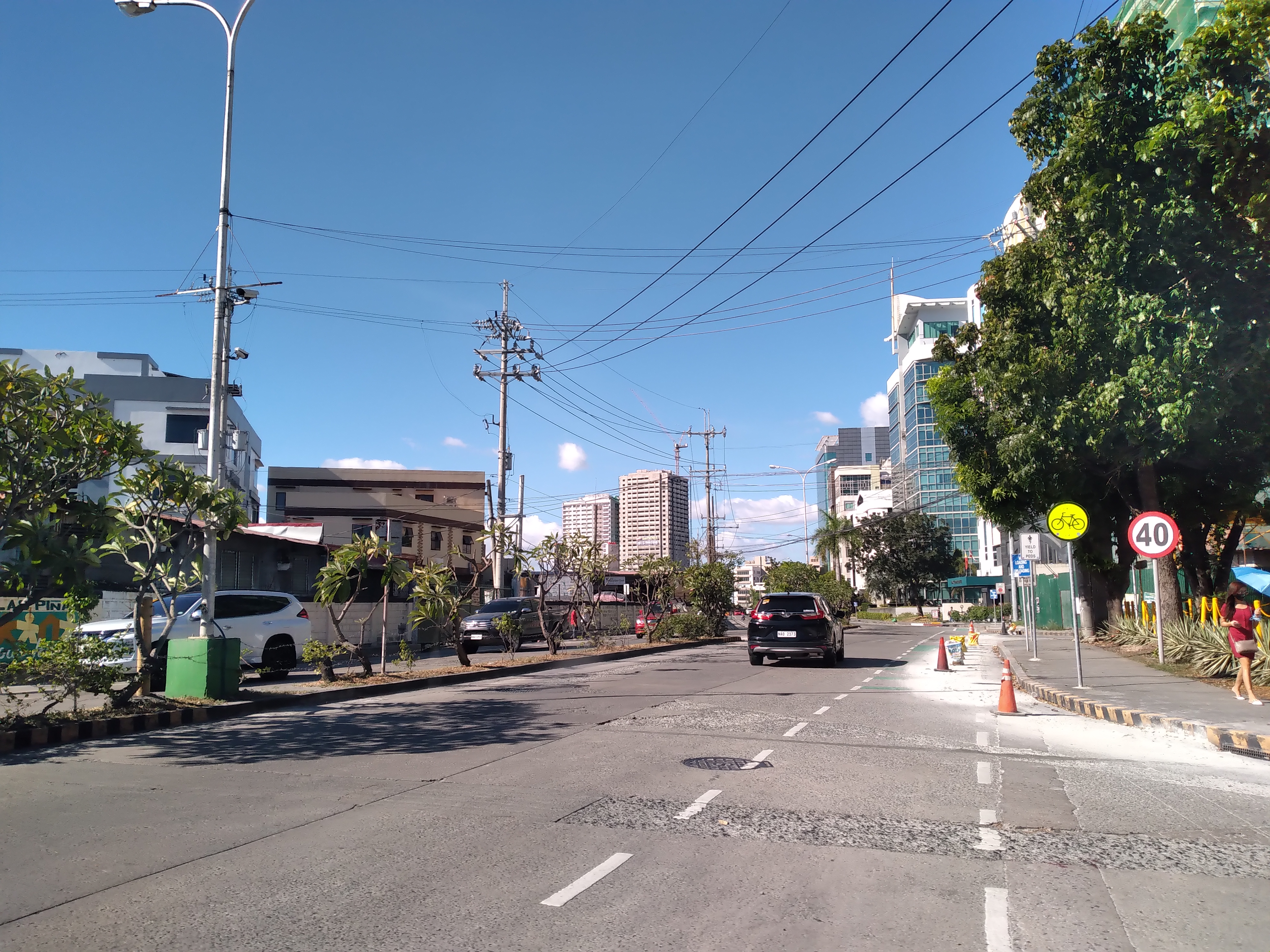
- Filinvest City New Bilibid Prison Diocesan Shrine of Our Lady of the Abandoned Parish Museo ng Muntinlupa Alabang Festival Alabang Sucat Thermal Power Plant Investment Drive

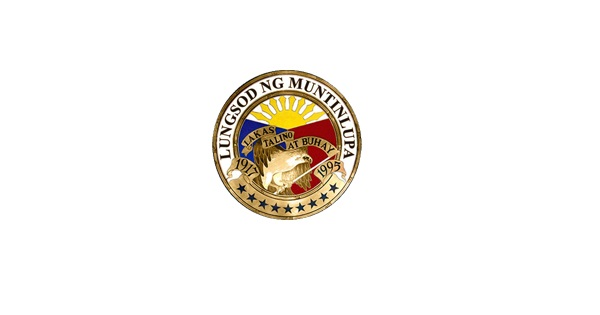
- Flag Seal Wordmark
- Nicknames: Munti, The Emerald City
- Mottoes: Lakas, Talino at Buhay (Strength, Wisdom and Life); Muntinlupa, Nakakaproud! (Muntinlupa, Something to be Proud of!)
- Anthem: Martsa ng Muntinlupa (Muntinlupa March)
- Map of Metro Manila with Muntinlupa highlighted
- Interactive map of Muntinlupa
- Location within the Philippines
- Coordinates: 14°23′N 121°03′E
- Country: Philippines
- Region: Metro Manila
- Province: none
- District: Lone district
- Founded: 1601
- Establishment as town: 1869
- Annexation to Pateros: October 12, 1903
- Annexation to Biñan: November 25, 1903
- Annexation to Taguig: March 22, 1905
- Chartered: January 1, 1918
- Cityhood and HUC: March 1, 1995
- Barangays: 9 (see Barangays)

Government
  - Type: Sangguniang Panlungsod
  - Mayor: Rozzano Rufino Biazon (One Muntinlupa)
  - Vice Mayor: Stephanie Teves Wong (Independent)
  - Representative: Jaime Fresnedi (Liberal)
  - Councilors: List: 1st District; Alexson Diaz; Raul Corro; Rachel Arciaga; Paty Katy Boncayao; Jedi Presnedi; Walter Arcilla; Ting Niefes; Amanda Camilon; 2nd District; Reggie Landrito; Jun Metong Sevilla; Kaye Anne Rongavilla; Ryan Bagatsing; Arlene Hilapo; Sha Sha Baes; Dado Moldez; Cornelio Martinez; ABC President; Allen Ampaya; SK President; Jonas Angelo Abadilla
  - Electorate: 314,934 voters (2025)

Area
  - Total: 39.75 km^{2} (15.35 sq mi)
- Elevation: 26 m (85 ft)
- Highest elevation: 136 m (446 ft)
- Lowest elevation: 0 m (0 ft)

Population (2024 census)
  - Total: 552,225
  - Density: 13,671.6/km^{2} (35,409/sq mi)
  - Households: 138,331
- Demonym: Muntinlupeño

Economy
  - Income class: 1st city income class
  - Poverty incidence: 0.1% (2023)
  - Revenue: ₱ 6,851 million (2024)
  - Assets: ₱ 20,485 million (2024)
  - Expenditure: ₱ 6,547 million (2024)
  - Liabilities: ₱ 5,743 million (2024)

Service provider
  - Electricity: Manila Electric Company (Meralco)
  - Water: Maynilad Water Services
- Time zone: UTC+8 (PST)
- PSGC: 1380800000
- IDD : area code: +63 (0)02
- Native languages: Filipino
- Website: www.muntinlupacity.gov.ph

Muntinlupa (Tagalog: [mʊntɪnˈlupɐ]), officially the City of Muntinlupa (Filipino: Lungsod ng Muntinlupa), is a highly urbanized city in the National Capital Region of the Philippines. According to the 2024 census, it has a population of 552,225 people.

It is bordered on the north by Taguig, to the northwest by Parañaque, by Bacoor and Las Piñas to the west, to the southwest by Dasmariñas, by San Pedro to the south, and by Laguna de Bay, the largest lake in the country, to the east. From high above, the city of Muntinlupa has many large, green patches, which is unusual for Metro Manila. Because of these green patches, Muntinlupa earned the name "Emerald City" by the tourism establishment and also known as the "Gateway to Calabarzon" as it is the southernmost city of the National Capital Region.

Muntinlupa is known as the location of the national insular penitentiary, the New Bilibid Prison, where the country's most dangerous criminals are incarcerated. This was relocated from its old site in Santa Cruz, Manila. Before the prison's relocation in the 1930s, Muntinlupa was mainly dedicated to fishing and farming.

Ayala Alabang Village, one of the country's largest and most expensive residential communities, is also located in Muntinlupa.

== Etymology ==
In historical maps, Muntinlupa (first attested in the 1800s) was variously spelled as "Montinlupa" (e.g. in the 1852 Coello-Morata Case Map) or "Muntinglupa" (e.g. in the 1887 Enrique d'Almonte Map). The 1987 Constitution also spells the city's name as "Muntinglupa" instead of "Muntinlupa". In the Diccionario geográfico, estadístico, histórico de las Islas Filipinas (Buzeta & Bravo, 1850-1851), it was spelled "Montinlupa".

The most plausible etymology for the name "Muntinlupa" or "Montinlupa" is a Hispanization of Tagalog muntíng lupà, literally meaning "small land" or alternatively, "little soil". The original Tagalog words can be inferred by comparing it to similar place-names during the Spanish era mentioned in the Diccionario Geográfico by Buzeta et al.: "Montin-ilog" (now Munting Ilog, Silang, Cavite), and "Montintubig" (now Munting-Tubig, Ibaan, Batangas). However, the precise reason why the place would be named as such is unknown.

== History ==
=== Spanish colonial era ===
In 1601, some 88 years after the arrival of Portuguese navigator Ferdinand Magellan in the Visayas islands, the original lands constituting Muntinlupa could be deduced to have been friar lands administered by the Augustinians, then sold and assigned to the Sanctuary of Guadalupe.

In the early 1800s, Joaquín Martínez de Zúñiga, an Augustinian friar, in his two-volume Book: "Estadismo de las islas Filipinas", described Muntinlupa as a lakeside town composed of 250 tributes (each tribute representing a family of 5 to 7), and was the farthest town of the province of Tondo (later Manila), itself composed of 14,437 native tributes and 3,528 Spanish Filipino tributes. He recorded the area, which is the present-day Poblacion, to be known as La Poblacion que Sigue se Llama Muntinlupa. Spiritually, it also belonged to the Parish of Our Lady of Guadalupe in San Pedro de Macati (present-day Makati) and was connected to it via many rivers that streamed from Laguna de Bay through Muntinlupa towards San Pedro de Macati and eventually Manila proper.

In 1869, the lands were transferred to the state and large individual landholders. In an effort by the Spanish Government to bring under closer administrative control the people living in the contiguous sitios, as well as those in Alabang, Tunasan, Sucat, and Cupang, the municipality was created upon the recommendation of Don Eduardo de Canizares.

On August 6, 1898, the town supported the Philippine Revolution against the Spaniards and formally joined the revolutionary government headed by Gen. Emilio Aguinaldo.

=== American occupation ===
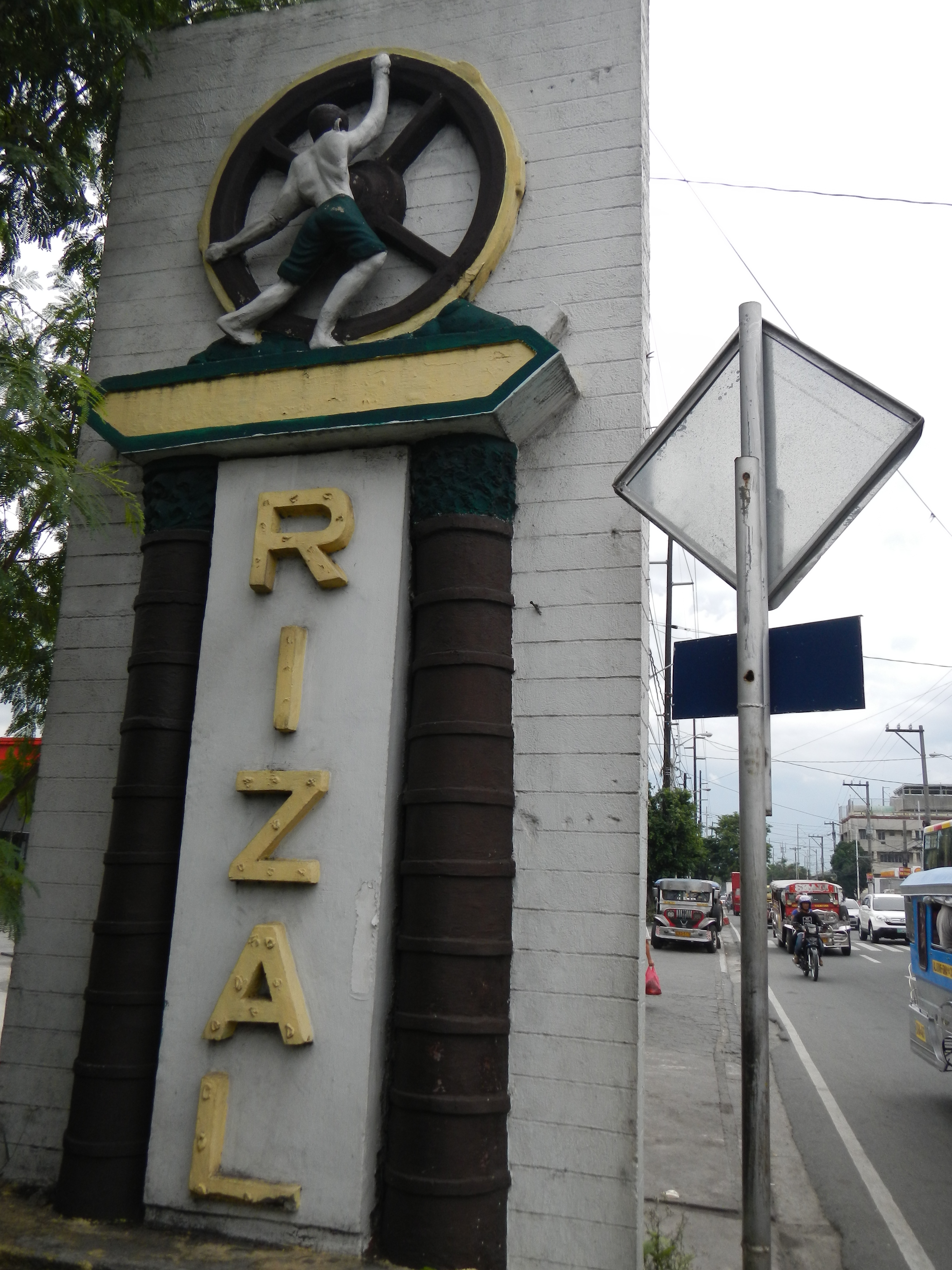
Welcome marker along Manila South Road at the Muntinlupa–San Pedro boundary reflecting the former Laguna–Rizal provincial boundary; Muntinlupa was part of Rizal from 1901–1903 and from 1905–1975.

The Philippine Commission promulgated Rizal Province on June 11, 1901, through Act No. 137. Muntinlupa became part of the new province after being a part of the defunct province of Manila.

On October 12, 1903, Muntinlupa, alongside Taguig, was merged with Pateros by virtue of Act No. 942. On November 25, 1903, Muntinlupa was incorporated under Act No. 1008 and included within the boundary of the province of La Laguna under the municipality of Biñan. Muntinlupa residents protested this Executive Act, and through their town head, Marcelo Fresnedi, filed a formal petition to the Governor for the return of the municipality to the province of Rizal. On March 22, 1905, Act No. 1308 paved the way for Muntinlupa's return to the province of Rizal to then become a part of Taguig, along with Pateros.

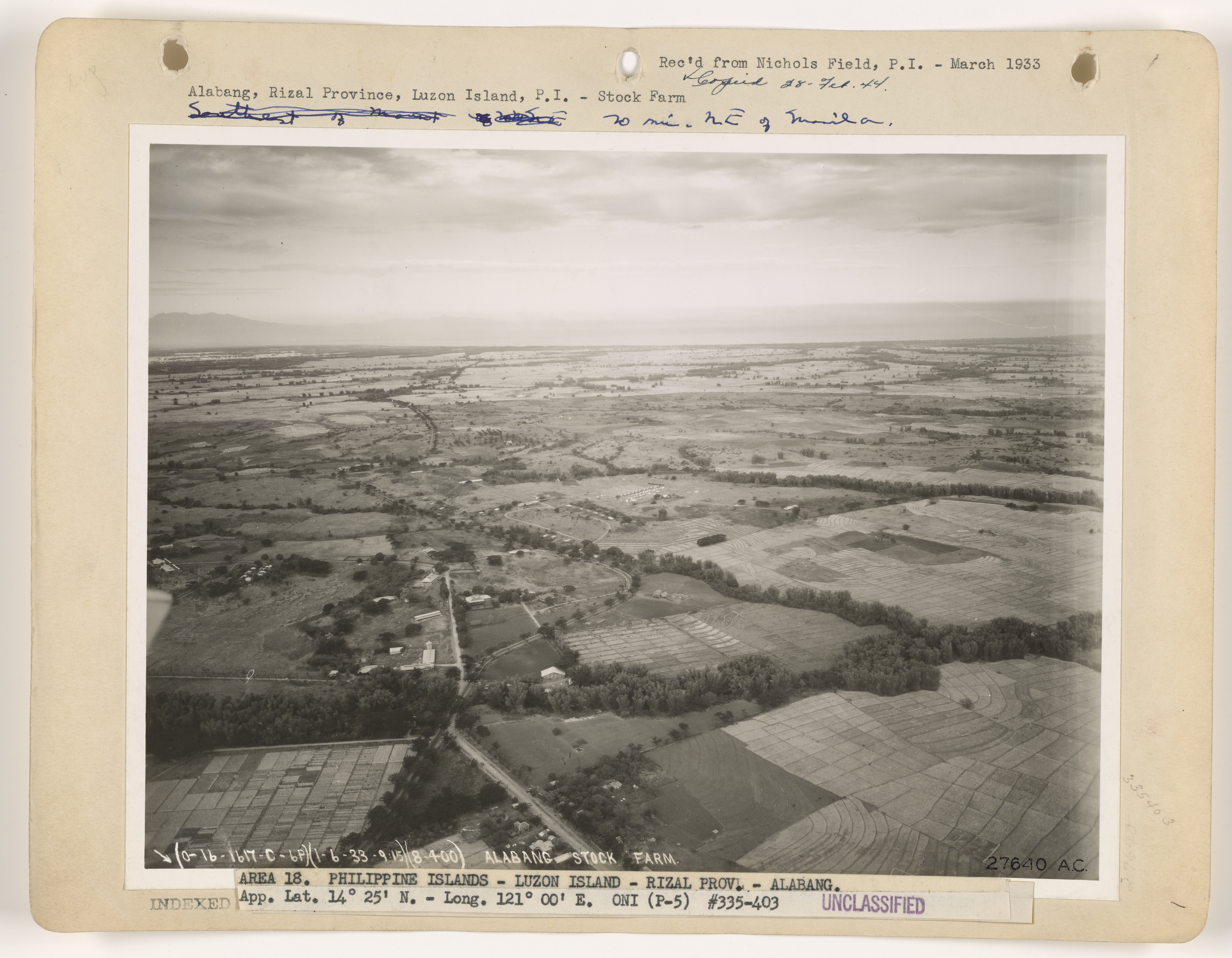
Aerial view of Alabang Stock Farm, 1933

On December 19, 1917, Governor-General Francis Burton Harrison signed Executive Order 108, which made Muntinlupa an independent municipality, separating it from Taguig. The law took effect on January 1, 1918. Vidal Joaquin, a native of Alabang, served as the first appointed mayor from 1918 to 1919, followed by Primo Ticman, native of Poblacion, from 1919 to 1922. Melencio Espeleta became the first elected mayor of Muntinlupa in 1922, serving until 1924.

=== Japanese occupation ===
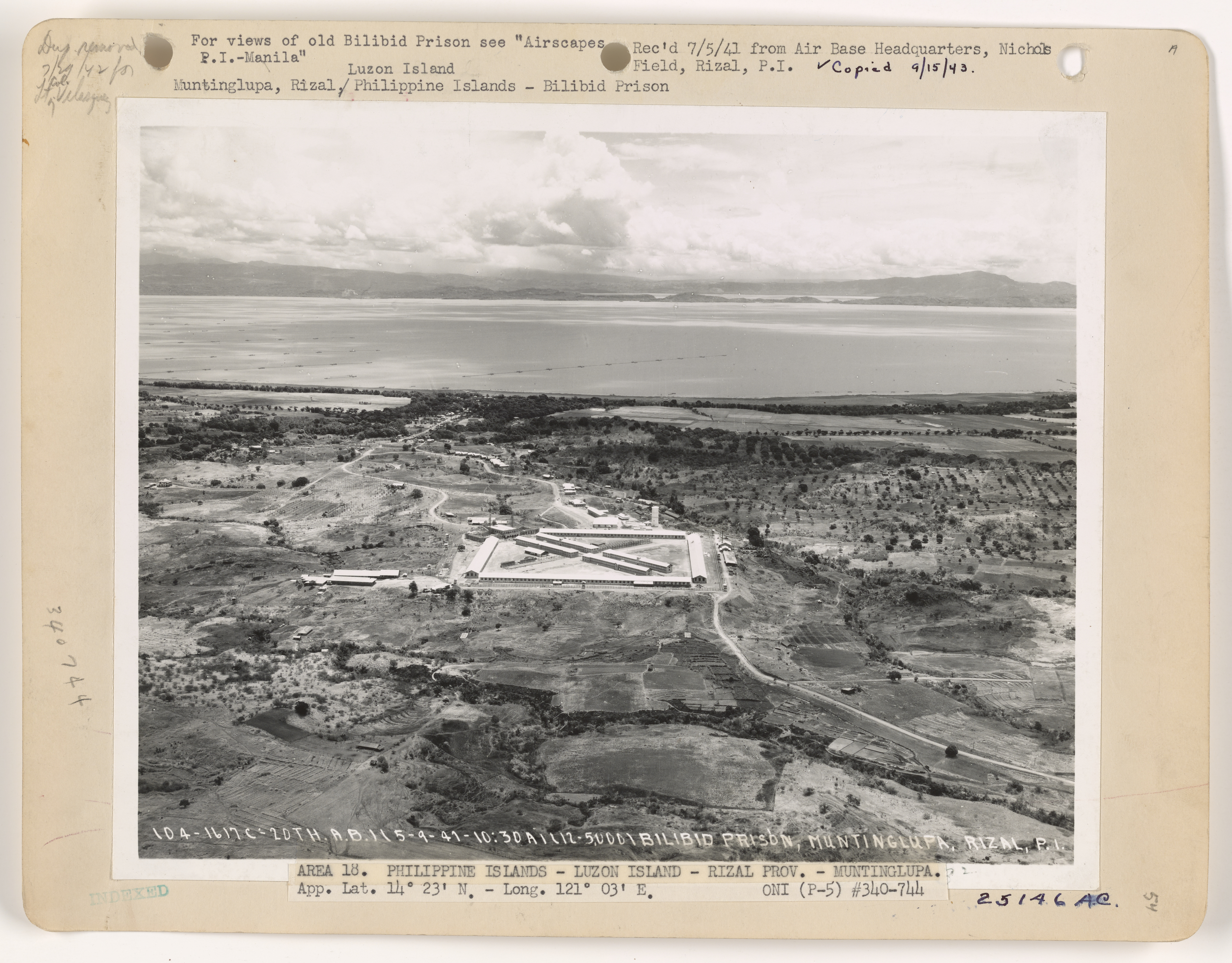
Aerial view of Muntinlupa with New Bilibid Prison, 1941

On January 22, 1941, the historic New Bilibid Prison, the national penitentiary, was established in the hills of Muntinlupa. During World War II, the New Bilibid Prison was used to lock up Filipino political prisoners by the Japanese occupation authorities, but they were set free by Hunters ROTC guerrillas.

=== Philippine independence ===
On November 12, 1963, in the early morning of election day, Nacionalista mayoralty candidate Maximino A. Argana was talking to his bodyguards at his home when he managed to avoid bullets that were fired at him by unknown gunmen. Incumbent mayor Francisco de Mesa later won reelection, defeating Argana. On March 18, 1964, de Mesa was assassinated by a gunman, and was succeeded by his vice mayor Demetrio Loresca.

On November 7, 1975, Muntinlupa was transferred from the Province of Rizal to the newly formed Metropolitan Manila by virtue of Presidential Decree No. 824 issued by then-President Ferdinand Marcos.

On June 13, 1986, following the EDSA Revolution in February of that year, President Corazón C. Aquino appointed Ignacio R. Bunye as Officer-in-Charge of Muntinlupa as part of a nationwide revamp of local government units. In the ratification of the 1987 Constitution, Muntinlupa together with Las Piñas formed one political district.

On January 31, 1988, protesters of the 1988 Muntinlupa election results who barricaded in front of the Muntinlupa town hall the past two days began storming the premises, with supporters of the two leading mayoral candidates confronting each other and causing injury to former mayor Santiago Carlos Jr. and barangay official Florante Torres among others. By February 17, a grenade that failed to explode was found to have been thrown onto the roof of mayor-elect Bunye's house in Alabang. On December 6, 1988, President Corazon C. Aquino by Proclamation 351 declares December 19 as "Municipality of Muntinlupa Day".

=== Cityhood ===
On February 16, 1995, House Bill No. 14401, which seeks to convert the municipality of Muntinlupa into a highly urbanized city, was approved by the House of Representatives.

On March 1, 1995, Muntinlupa became the 65th city in the Philippines as signed into law by President Fidel V. Ramos, its conversion into a highly urbanized city by virtue of Republic Act (R.A.) No. 7926. Per Section 62 of R.A. 7926, Muntinlupa and Las Piñas were to constitute separate congressional districts, with each district electing its separate representative in the 1998 elections. This separation was additionally confirmed in the city charter of Las Piñas (R.A. 8251) which was approved by plebiscite on March 26, 1997. Ignacio Bunye, who previously served as mayor of Muntinlupa, was elected in 1998 as the first congressman representing the city.

On March 1, 2001, Republic Act No. 9191 was enacted, declaring March 1 of every year as a Special Non-working Holiday in the City of Muntinlupa to be known as "The Muntinlupa City Charter Day".

=== Contemporary ===
On August 3, 2007, the Muntinlupa City Hall was completely damaged and later abandoned due to a fire. The fire started from a slum area behind the city hall. Almost all files, important documents and other references of Muntinlupa were burned.

== Geography ==
=== Topography ===
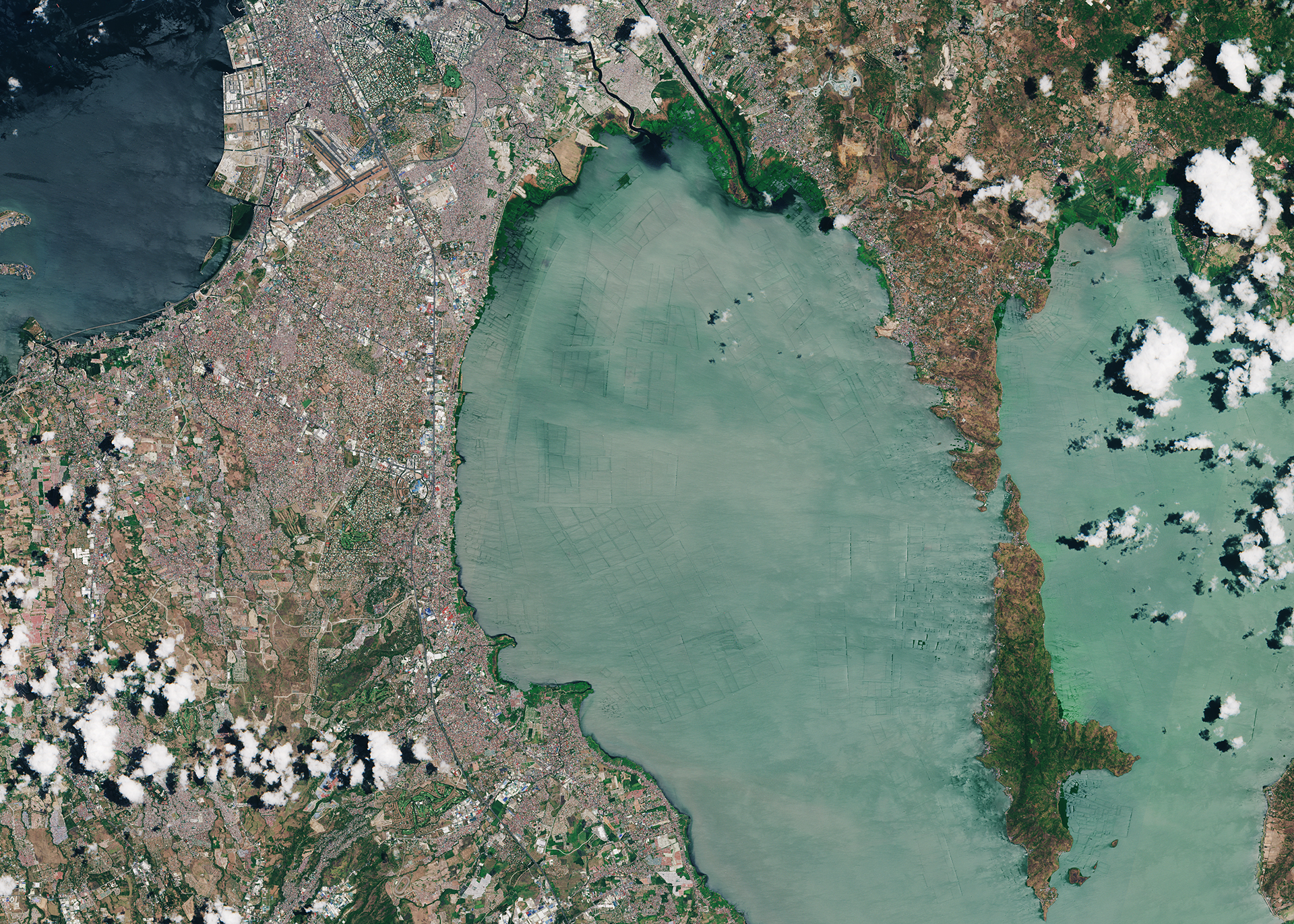
Photo of Muntinlupa along Laguna de Bay and nearby cities captured by the Copernicus Sentinel-2A satellite on May 8, 2016

It is bordered on the north by Taguig, to the northwest by Parañaque, to the west by Las Piñas, to the southwest by the cities of Bacoor and Dasmariñas in Cavite, to the south by the city of San Pedro in Laguna, and to the east by Laguna de Bay, the largest lake in the country.

Muntinlupa's terrain is relatively flat to sloping towards the east along the lake. Gentle rolling hills occupy the western part of the city, with elevation increasing up to 60 meters (200 ft) and above towards its southwest portion.

While a majority of the land area in the city is highly urbanized, the New Bilibid Prison (NBP) Reservation in barangay Poblacion is relatively free of urbanization, although there are ongoing discussions to move the national penitentiary to Nueva Ecija and Occidental Mindoro, respectively.

=== Cityscape ===
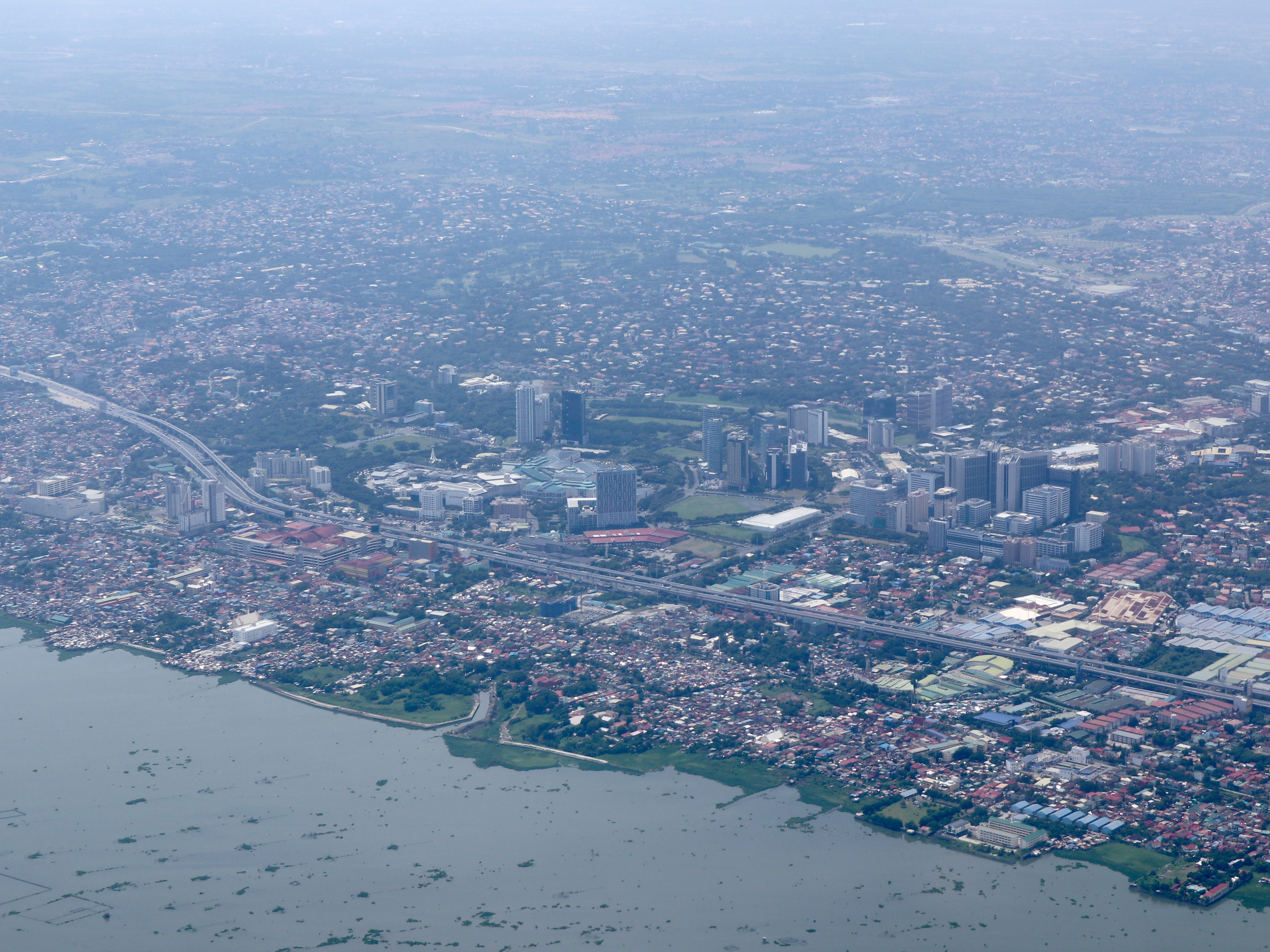
Aerial view of Muntinlupa with Filinvest City development in the center right.

Alabang is the central business district of the city where the tallest structures in the city are located. It used to be the location of Alabang Stock Farm. Land reclamation is also done along the Laguna Lake for further developments in the city. During the dry season, the water level in the lake subsides, exposing the soil that is then used for farming.

=== Climate ===
The dry season rungs through the months of November to April, while the wet season starts in May and lasts to November. The wet season reaches its peak in the month of August. Maximum rainfall in Muntinlupa usually occurs from the month of June to September. The average annual of rainfall is 2,014.8 millimeters (79.32 in) with a peak of 420.0 millimeters (16.54 in) in July and a low 26.9 millimeters (1.06 in) in April. The highest temperature occurs during the month of April and May at 34 °C (93 °F), while the lowest occurs during the months of January and February at 24 °C (75 °F).

Climate data for Muntinlupa
Month	Jan	Feb	Mar	Apr	May	Jun	Jul	Aug	Sep	Oct	Nov	Dec	Year
Mean daily maximum °C (°F)	29 (84)	30 (86)	32 (90)	34 (93)	32 (90)	31 (88)	29 (84)	29 (84)	29 (84)	30 (86)	30 (86)	29 (84)	30 (87)
Mean daily minimum °C (°F)	21 (70)	20 (68)	21 (70)	22 (72)	24 (75)	24 (75)	24 (75)	24 (75)	24 (75)	23 (73)	22 (72)	21 (70)	23 (73)
Average precipitation mm (inches)	10 (0.4)	10 (0.4)	12 (0.5)	27 (1.1)	94 (3.7)	153 (6.0)	206 (8.1)	190 (7.5)	179 (7.0)	120 (4.7)	54 (2.1)	39 (1.5)	1,094 (43)
Average rainy days	5.2	4.5	6.4	9.2	19.7	24.3	26.9	25.7	24.4	21.0	12.9	9.1	189.3
Source: Meteoblue

=== Natural hazards ===
The west segment of the Marikina Valley Fault System, the West Valley Fault (WVF) cuts through parts of Muntinlupa and moves in a predominantly dextral strike-slip motion. The West Valley Fault is capable of producing large scale earthquakes on its active phases with a magnitude of 7 or higher.

=== Districts and barangays ===
Muntinlupa is represented in the congress by its lone congressional district, and the city is politically subdivided into nine barangays.

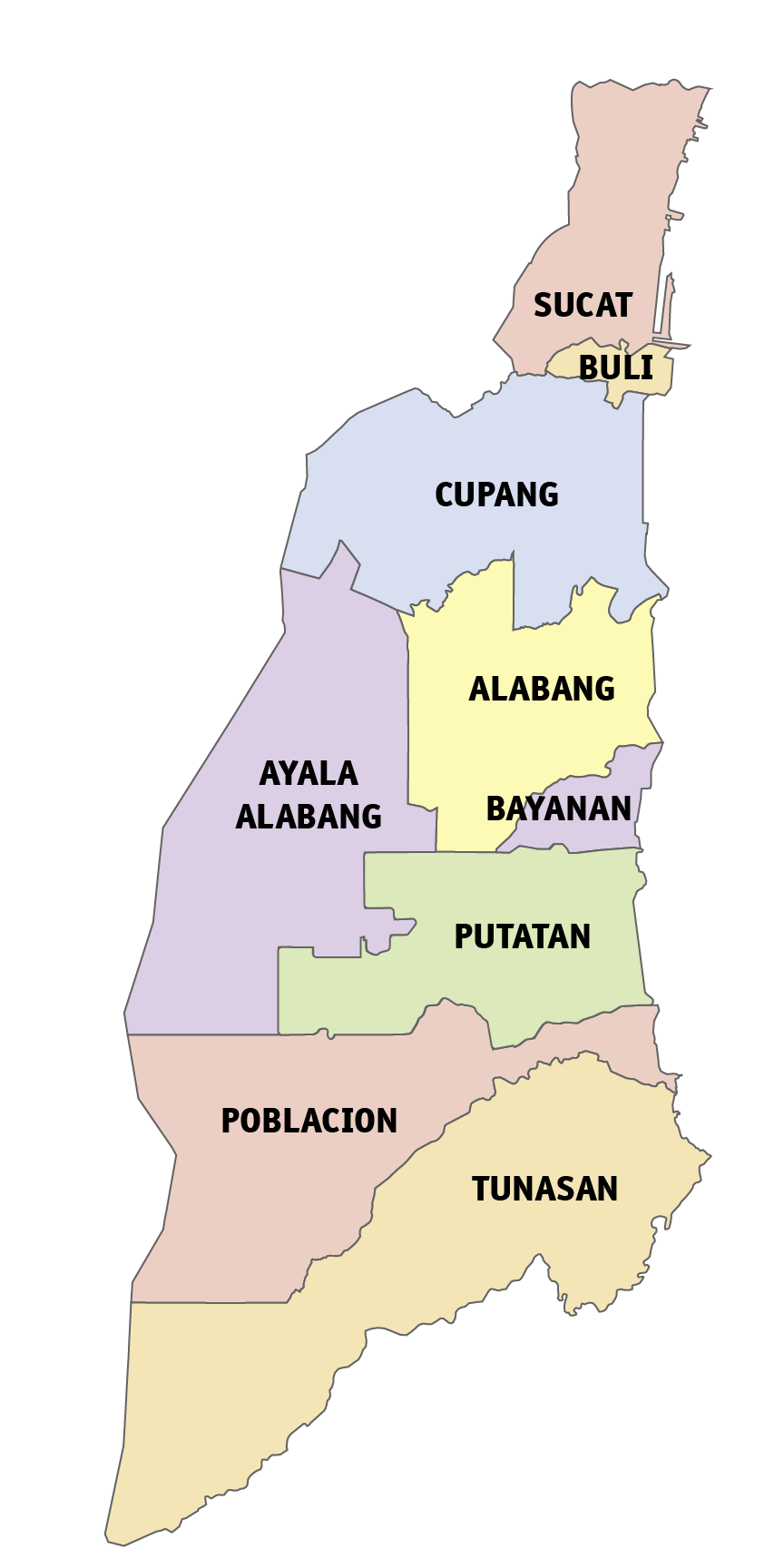
Barangay map of Muntinlupa

Lone District
Barangay	Population (2024)		Area^{[a]}		ZIP Code	Established
Alabang	12.5%	69,215	8.064	3.114	1781	
Ayala Alabang	4.1%	22,850	6.949	2.683	1799	
Bayanan	6.9%	38,358	0.784	0.303	1772	
Buli	2.7%	14,802	0.437	0.169	1771	
Cupang	10.4%	57,482	5.370	2.073	1771	
Poblacion	22.6%	124,554	6.131	2.367	1776	
Putatan	18.5%	102,146	6.746	2.605	1772	
Sucat	10.8%	59,601	2.623	1.013	1770	
Tunasan	11.4%	63,217	9.596	3.705	1773	
Total		552,225	39.75	15.35		

Other zip codes include Muntinlupa Central Post Office 1770, Ayala Alabang Village 1780, Pleasant Village 1777, Susana Heights 1774, and Filinvest City 1781.

==== Etymology of barangays ====
The barangays of the city are named after the botanical characteristics, topographical features, and historical events that had been observed in the area when it was named. Tunasan from the plant tunas. Putatan got its name from a tree called putat. Cupang is likewise named after the cupang tree. Buli is named after the buri palm. Alabang is named after the river that passes through the barangay. Ayala Alabang was created by Batas Pambansa Bilang 219 out of Barangay Alabang. Sucat got its name from the vernacular word "sukat", which means "measurement" since it was measured during the Spanish era.

=== Subdivisions ===
While barangays are the administrative divisions of the city and are legally part of the addresses of homes and establishments, many residents identify themselves by their subdivision (village) instead of their barangay.

=== Territorial dispute and discrepancies ===
Muntinlupa is involved in a boundary dispute with Parañaque, centered on Sitio Bagong Silang, which is claimed by Sucat and contested by Parañaque's barangay BF Homes. Additionally, Sitio Pagkakaisa in barangay San Martin de Porres, Parañaque is mistakenly regarded as part of Sucat.

== Demographics ==
Population census of Muntinlupa

Year	Pop.	±% p.a.
1903	3,128	—
1918	4,712	+2.77%
1939	9,288	+3.28%
1948	18,444	+7.92%
1960	21,893	+1.44%
1970	65,057	+11.49%

Year	Pop.	±% p.a.
1975	94,563	+7.79%
1980	136,679	+7.64%
1990	278,411	+7.38%
1995	399,846	+7.02%
2000	379,310	−1.12%
2007	452,943	+2.48%

Year	Pop.	±% p.a.
2010	459,941	+0.56%
2015	504,509	+1.78%
2020	543,445	+1.58%
2024	552,225	+0.39%

Source: Philippine Statistics Authority

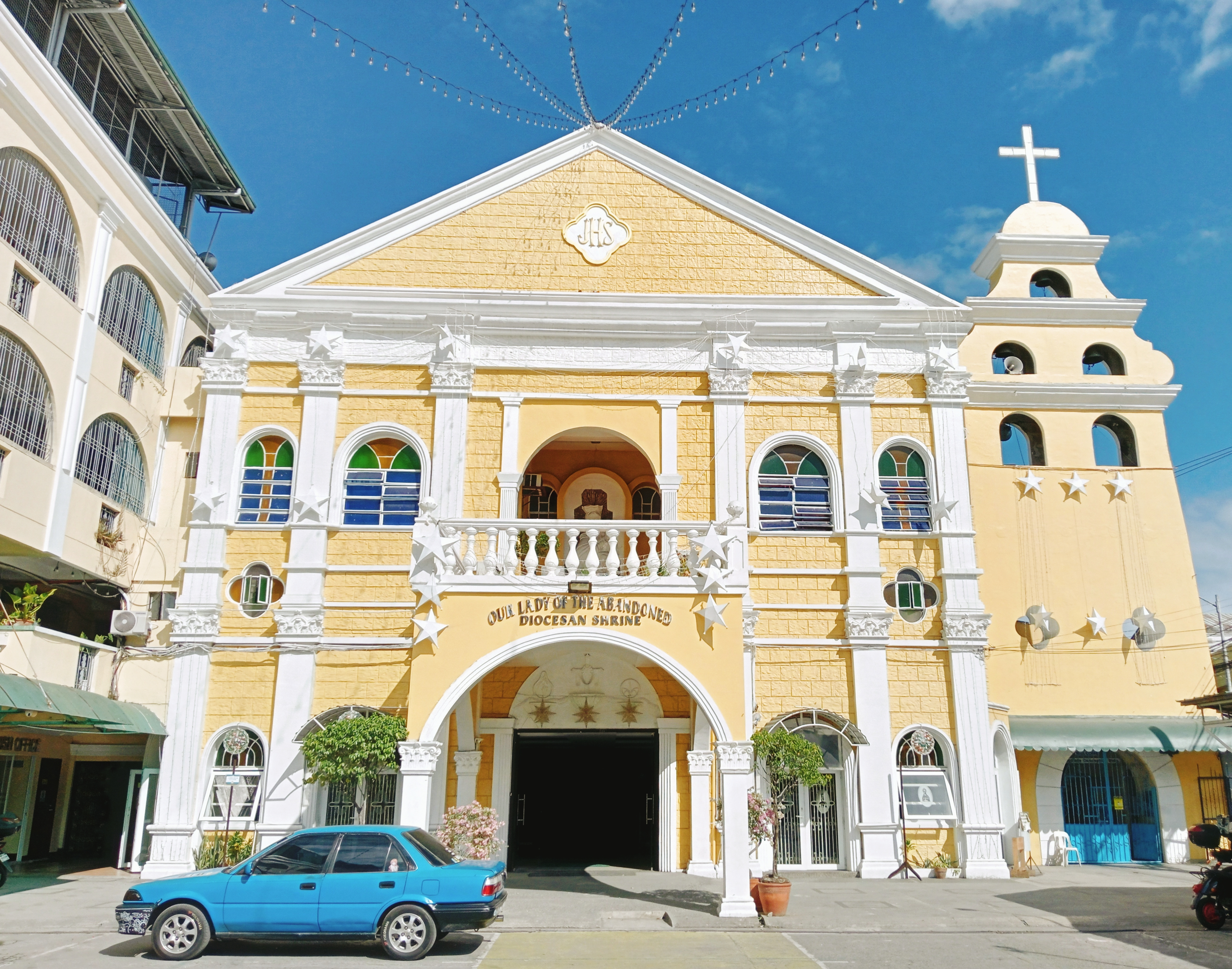
The Diocesan Shrine of Our Lady of the Abandoned Parish, a Catholic church in Poblacion, Muntinlupa (Which, Is the Patron Church of Muntinlupa)

As of the 2024 census, Muntinlupa has a population of 552,225, with a density of 13,671.6 inhabitants per square kilometre or 35,409 inhabitants per square mile.

=== Demonym ===
People from Muntinlupa are referred to as Muntinlupeño as an adaptation from the standard Spanish suffix -(eñ/n)o.

=== Language ===
The native language of Muntinlupa is Tagalog, but the majority of the residents can understand and speak English.

=== Religion ===
People in Muntinlupa are mainly Roman Catholic. Catholic churches in Muntinlupa fall under the jurisdiction of the Diocese of Parañaque, with about 11 parishes within Muntinlupa.

Other religions in Muntinlupa include various Protestant denominations, Iglesia ni Cristo, Members Church of God International, The Church of Jesus Christ of Latter-day Saints (which has a temple in Alabang), Hinduism, Buddhism and Islam.

== Economy ==
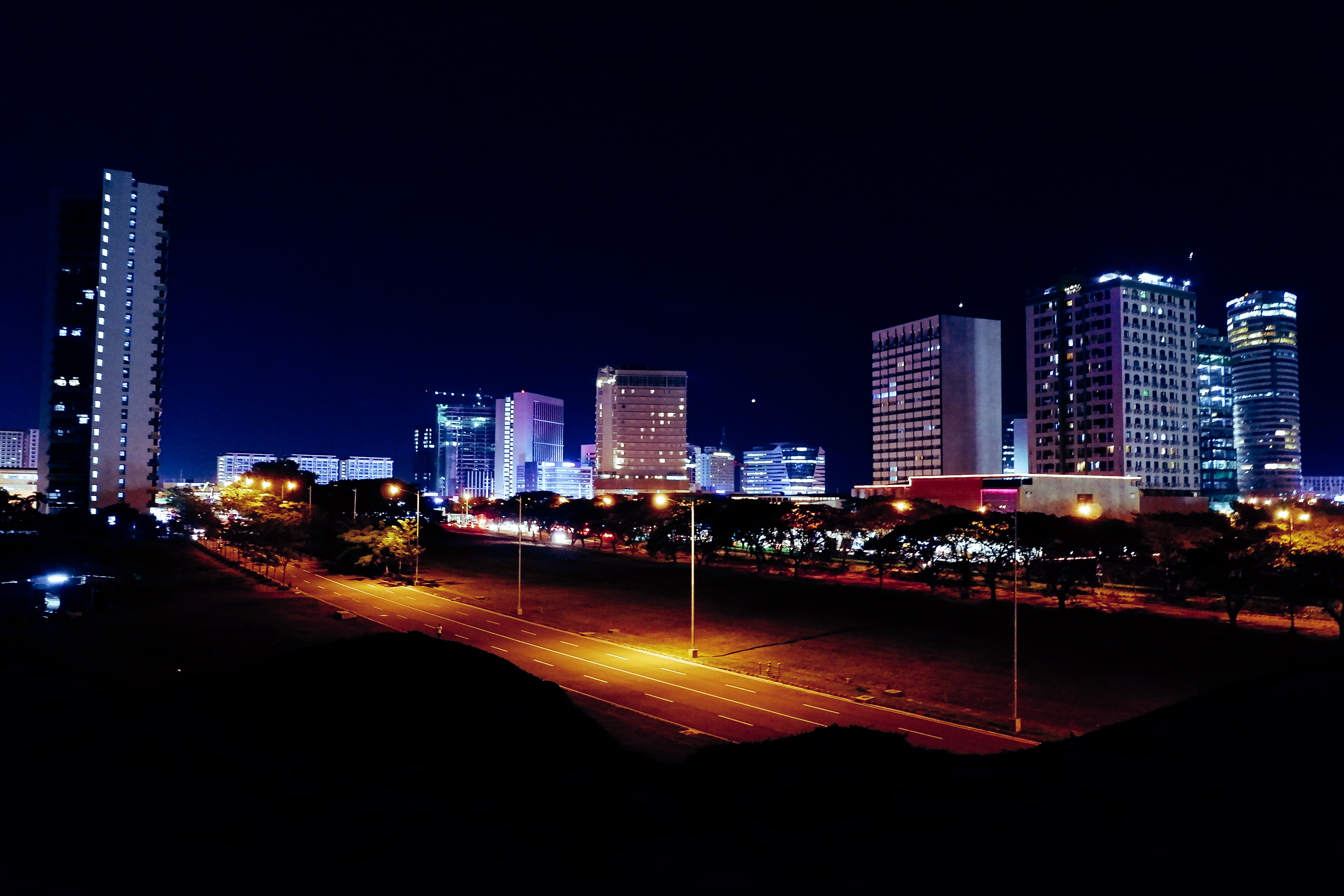
Skyline of Filinvest City, the central business district of Muntinlupa.

Poverty incidence of Muntinlupa (%)

Source: Philippine Statistics Authority

Muntinlupa has the eighth-highest per capita GDP of the country at ₱467,662 (US$8,700).

Barangay Alabang, part of the second district of Muntinlupa, has undergone tremendous growth mainly due to a development boom in the late 1990s. The development of two large-scale commercial real estate projects namely; the Filinvest Corporate City and Ayala Land's Madrigal Business Park, changed the landscape of Muntinlupa from what was once vast fields of cow pasture in the late 1980s, into a supercity that houses new residential, business, industrial and commercial establishments.

The Muntinlupa "Business One-Stop-Shop" is recognized in the 2014 World Cities Summit in Singapore in its effectiveness in reducing the number of steps in acquiring a Business Permit.

=== Industry ===
Northgate Cyberzone is the information technology park within Filinvest Corporate City in Alabang. The 18.7-hectare (46-acre), PEZA registered IT zone is designed, mastered-planned and built around the needs of technology-based companies engaged in Business Process Outsourcing (BPO), Knowledge Process Outsourcing (KPO), education, learning and firm, software design and multimedia, call centers, e-commerce, banking and financial services, as well as other IT support businesses and the like. It is home to Capital One Philippines Support Services Corp., Convergys Philippines Corp, HSBC Electronic Data Processing (Philippines), Inc., Genpact, Verizon Business and many more.

Kawasaki Motors Philippines Corporation is in charge of production and distribution of Kawasaki Motors in the Philippines. KMPC, having been in the country for over 40 years, is hailed today as one of the top manufacturers in the Philippine motorcycle industry. Amkor Technology is a semiconductor product packaging and test services provider that established its first Philippine plant in Cupang. Pepsi-Cola Products Philippines has a plant located in Tunasan. Zuellig Pharma is also within the city.

=== Commerce ===
Shopping centers in Muntinlupa include Alabang Town Center, which is owned by Rockwell Land Corporation, Ayala Malls South Park (also known as South Park Center), which is owned by Ayala Malls, Festival Alabang owned and operated by Filinvest Development Corporation, Starmall Alabang (formerly known as Metropolis Star Alabang), SM Center Muntinlupa owned by SM Prime Holdings, Commercenter Alabang, and W.Mall Muntinlupa. There are also multiple car dealerships located in Muntinlupa and most of them are along the Alabang–Zapote Road in Alabang.

== Government ==
Muntinlupa City Hall

=== Local government ===
Muntinlupa is governed primarily by the city mayor, the vice mayor and the city councilors. The mayor acts as the chief executive of the city, while the city councilors act as its legislative body. The vice mayor, besides taking on mayoral responsibilities in case of a temporary vacancy, acts as the presiding officer of the city legislature. The legislative body is composed of 16 regular members (8 per district) and representatives from the barangay and the youth council.

The Bureau of Corrections has its headquarters in the New Bilibid Prison Reservation in Muntinlupa.

"Most Business Friendly City" on 2001, 2002 & 2006 as awarded by the Philippine Chamber of Commerce and Industry

Muntinlupa is the first city in the Philippines to ban the use of plastic bags and styrofoam for packaging. The Muntinlupa city government encourages to "Bring your own Bag" or "BYOB" when shopping to reduce the use of plastic bags that would otherwise clog the waterways.

ISO Certification on Quality Management System or ISO 9001:2000 has initially been acquired on 2004 and is valid for 3 years. Muntinlupa has re-acquired its ISO Certification on QMS in April 2015, ISO 9001:2008, together with Ospital ng Muntinlupa and Pamantasan ng Lungsod ng Muntinlupa as certified by BRS Rim of the World Operations, California.

=== City seal ===
Muntinlupa city seal

Designed by Manuel Amorsolo, son of National Artist Fernando Amorsolo, the city seal features the Philippine Eagle, the biggest, the strongest and the highest flying bird of the Philippine Republic, a bird that symbolizes the city's mission to become the Premiere Emerald City of the 21st Century. It is composed of:

- The Philippine Eagle – Symbolizes the City of Muntinlupa soaring into new heights in terms of progress and prosperity; the characteristics properly enlikened to a mother, that is caring, loving and nurturing her children to become good and responsible citizens of the country; and Muntinlupa's hope, vision and dream of becoming a premiere city of the nation.
- Bamboo Surrounding the Seal – Symbolizes the ability of the citizens of Muntinlupa to cope up with the fast changing times; that we can withstand the trials that come our way and stand still and ready to triumph again.
- Lakas, Talino at Buhay – These are words taken from the lyrics of the Muntinlupa March, the city's official anthem. These are values that will guide the city in achieving its goals and visions.
- 1917 and 1995 – The year 1917 marks the time when Muntinlupa became an independent municipality (although it was effective January 1, 1918, by virtue of Executive Order 108) while the year 1995 was the time when Muntinlupa became a city.
- The Philippine Flag – The flag behind the eagle symbolizes the City of Muntinlupa being a part of the Republic of the Philippines and its government.
- The Nine Stars – The nine stars symbolize the nine barangays that comprises the City of Muntinlupa, namely Tunasan, Poblacion, Putatan, Bayanan, Alabang, Cupang, Buli, Sucat and Ayala Alabang.

=== City hymn ===
Muntinlupa has its official hymn, called "Martsa ng Muntinlupa", composed by Renato Dilig. It was adopted in 1989, during its time as municipality.

=== List of former chief executives ===
Municipal Mayors:

- Vidal Joaquin - 1918–1919
- Primo Ticman - 1919–1922
- Melencio Espeleta - 1922–1924
- Pedro E. Diaz - 1925–1930
- Tomas M. Molina - 1931–1933
- Marciano E. Arciaga - 1934–1936
- Leon Mendiola - 1937–1939
- Francisco Gilbuena - February–April 1945
- Baldomero Viñalon - 1945–1946; 1952–1959
- Bonifacio Ticman - 1946–1959
- Francisco de Mesa Sr. - 1959–1964
- Demetrio Loresca Sr. - March–September 1964 (Succession after Mayor de Mesa's assassination); October 1966–1971
- Maximino Argana - October 1964 – October 1966; 1972–1985
- Santiago V. Carlos - 1985–1986
- Ignacio R. Bunye - 1986–1987; 1988–1995
- Victor C. Aguinaldo - December 2, 1987–February 1, 1988 (as Officer in Charge during the 1988 local elections)

City Mayors:

- Ignacio R. Bunye - 1995–1998
- Jaime R. Fresnedi - 1998–2007; 2013–2022
- Aldrin L. San Pedro - 2007–2013
- Rozzano Rufino B. Biazon - 2022–present

== Culture ==
=== Museum ===
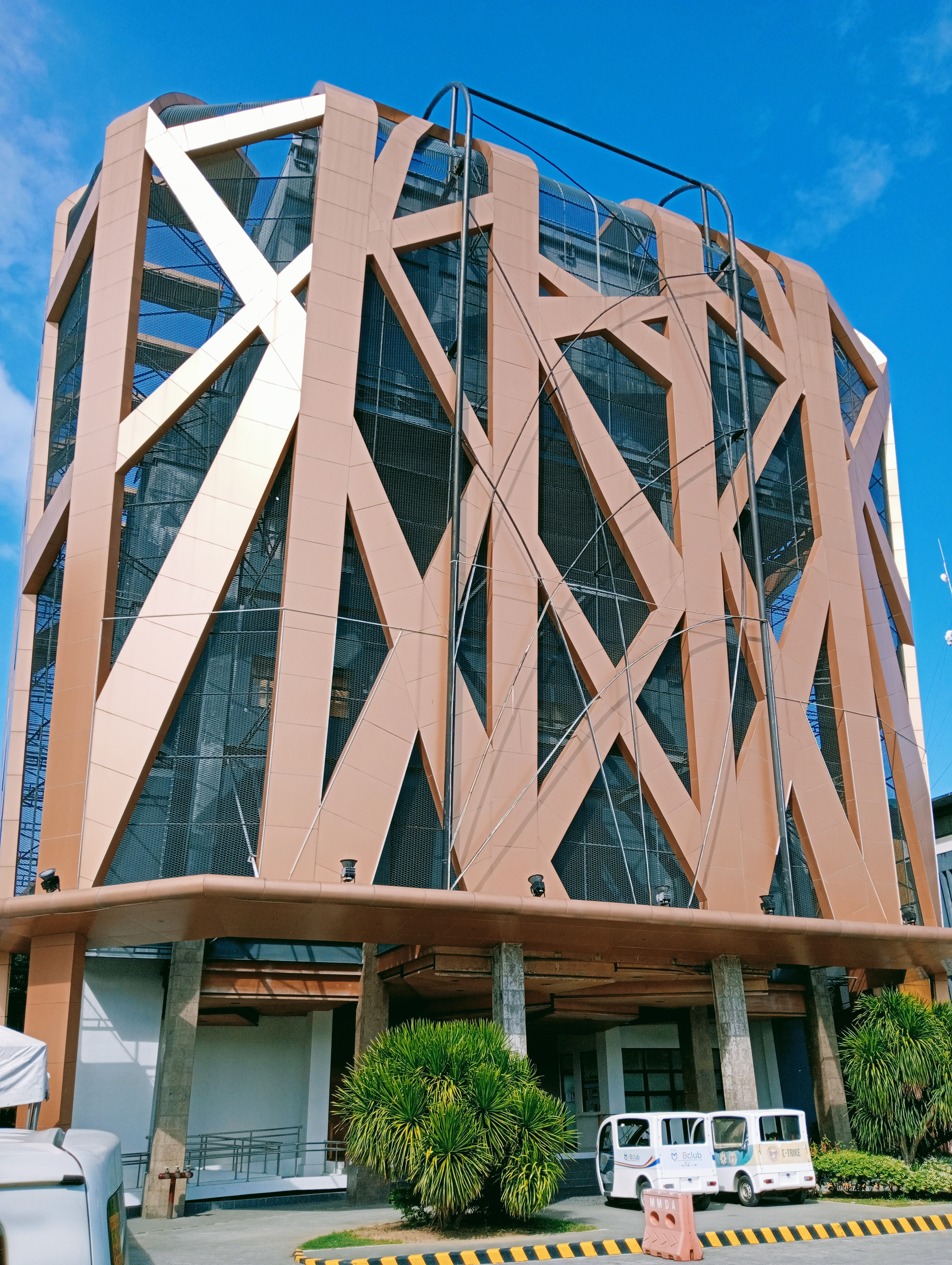
Museo ng Muntinlupa

Museo ng Muntinlupa is a five-story structure which is set to contain items of historical value to the city. The exterior is designed to look like a traditional fishtrap.

=== Libraries ===
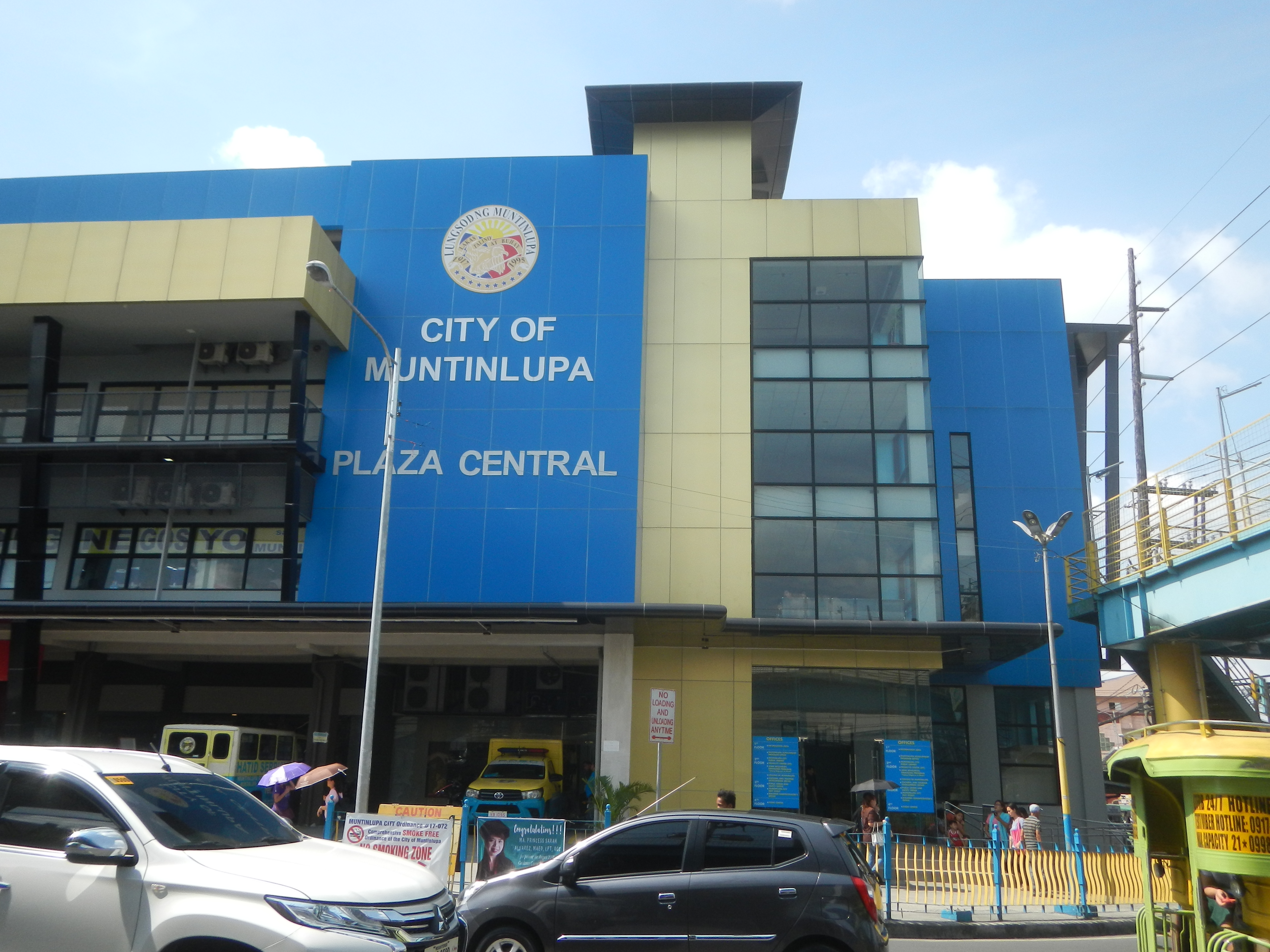
Plaza Central Building, where the Muntinlupa Public Library is located

Muntinlupa City Public Library is located at the Plaza Central Building in Poblacion. Plaza Central replaced the Contessa Building (Old City Hall) and was inaugurated on October 6, 2017.

=== Sports and recreation ===
Muntinlupa is home to the Muntinlupa Cagers, one of the Maharlika Pilipinas Basketball League's charter teams.

Muntinlupa has 10 swimming pools, 14 billiard halls, 11 tennis courts, 8 resorts, 7 country clubs, 9 Dance/Fitness/Slimming Centers, 41 open basketball courts, 59 covered basketball courts and 11 parks & playgrounds. The Muntinlupa Sports Complex is used for a variety of activities such as concerts, conferences, reunions and graduations, the sports complex has 3,500 seating capacity and has two separate multipurpose rooms.

The Muntinlupa Aquatic Center also hosts an Olympic-sized swimming pool, the first of its kind in the Philippines. Both the Sports Complex and Aquatic Center are located on a reclaimed area in Barangay Tunasan; it also has an open area which local residents enjoy their morning exercise and leisure time.

=== Music ===
Since 2017, the site of Karpos' Wanderland Music and Arts Festival has been hosted annually in Muntinlupa. The location of this venue is in the Filinvest City Events Grounds, situated in the heart of the Alabang district. The event hosts various bands, that range from international to homegrown artists, and live art performances.

Muntinlupa is also home to 19 East, a premier live music venue that features the country's top artists. Gigs usually occur on a daily basis, suggesting that any given day would guarantee customers a lively experience.

== Public utilities ==
=== Electricity ===
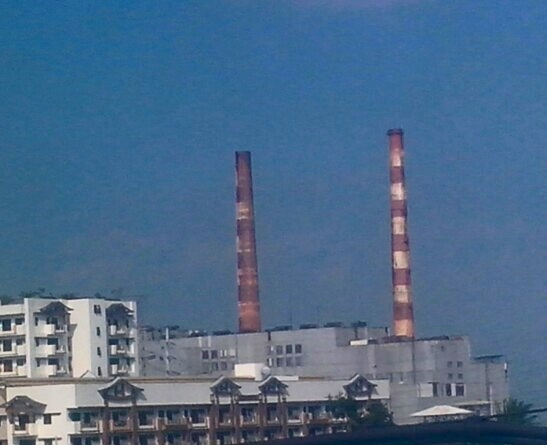
The Sucat Thermal Power Plant in 2015.

The sole distributor of electricity in Metro Manila is the Manila Electric Company, also known as Meralco.

The de-commissioned Sucat Thermal Power Plant is located at Sucat.

=== Water and sewage ===
Water in Muntinlupa is provided by Maynilad Water Services (also known as Maynilad), which also serves western Metro Manila and some parts of Cavite. It is one of the two concessionaires that provide water to Metro Manila in the Philippines; the other one is Manila Water which serves the eastern Metro Manila.

==== Laguna Lake Drinking Water Treatment Plant ====
On December 15, 2023, President Bongbong Marcos, assisted by Maynilad president and CEO Ramoncito Fernandez, MWSS administrator, Leonor Cleofas and Manuel Pangilinan inaugurated MWSS’ Poblacion Water Treatment Plant in Muntinlupa. The operation and maintenance of the Laguna Lake Drinking Water Treatment Plant was awarded by MWS to Acciona, CEO José Díaz-Caneja, and D.M Consulting Inc.-DMCI Holdings, Inc. It would process 150 million liters (40×10^{6} U.S. gal) of drinking water a day from Laguna de Bay. On April 15, 2024, it won the “Water Project of the Year” in the London Global Water Awards by Global Water Summit.

Maynilad has also 2 water purifier plants in Barangay Putatan, drawing water also from Laguna de Bay Lake and producing 300 million liters (79×10^{6} U.S. gal) of water per day for south clients.

=== Telecommunication ===
Majority of the land-line connection is provided by phone carrier Philippine Long Distance Telephone Company. Mobile telecommunication services are mostly provided by Globe Telecom, Smart Communications, and Dito Telecommunity.

== Transportation ==
Muntinlupa can be accessed through private vehicles, buses, jeepneys, taxis, tricycles, and UV Express vans. Electric vehicles by both private and public sectors operate within the city.

=== Public utility vehicles ===
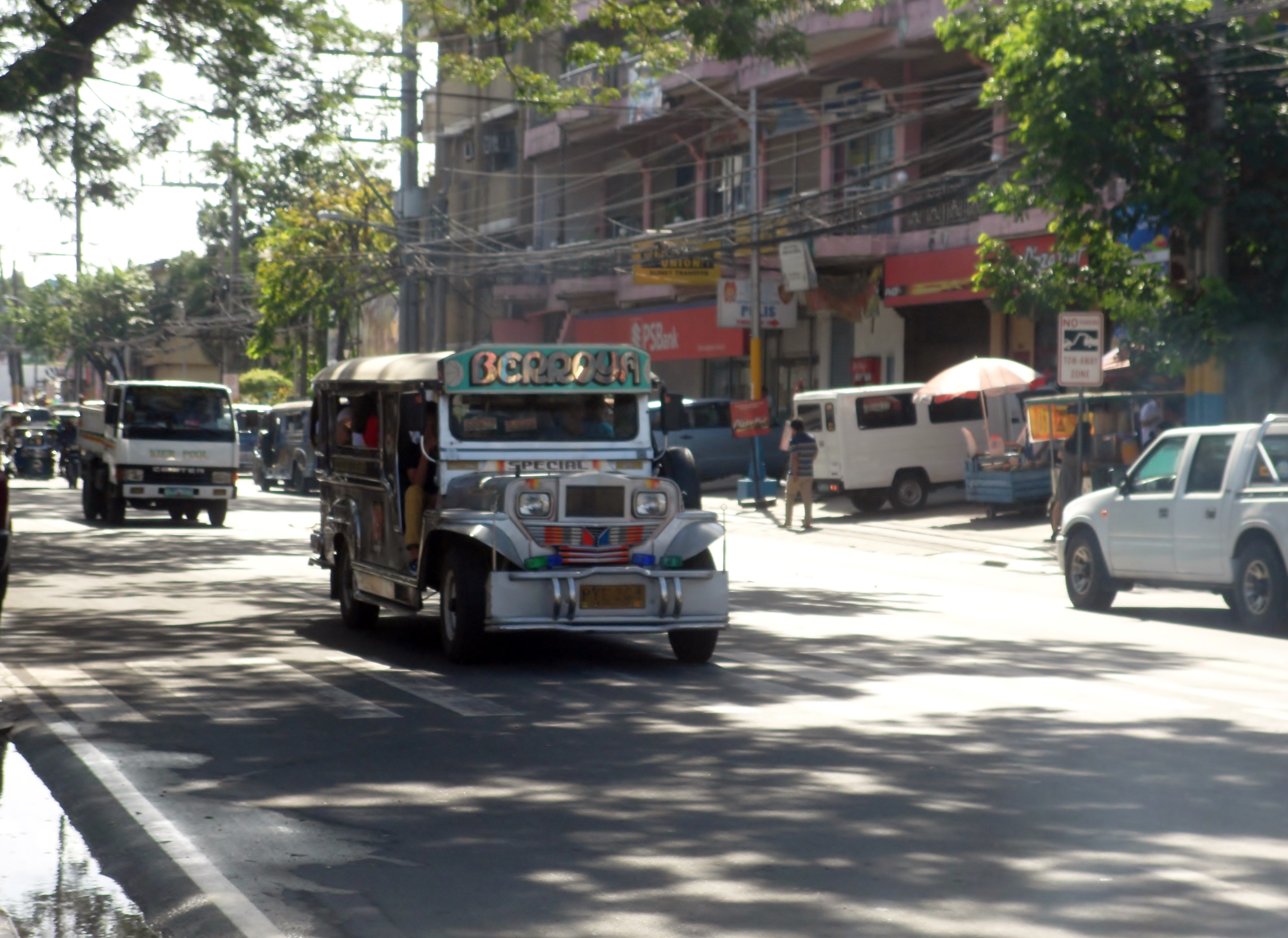
A jeepney on National Road (Manila South Road) in Putatan. Jeepneys serve as a main mode of transportation in Muntinlupa.

City buses with routes to Cavite, Makati, Manila, and Valenzuela serve the two terminals at Alabang: the Vista Terminal Exchange at the former Starmall Alabang and South Station at Filinvest City. Point-to-point buses to Batangas, Makati, Manila, Ninoy Aquino International Airport, Ortigas Center and San Juan depart from the Vista Terminal Exchange, Alabang Town Center, and South Park Center in Alabang, respectively. Provincial buses to Batangas City, Lucena, Quezon, and the Bicol Region also depart from Alabang.

Jeepneys routes to General Mariano Alvarez, Calamba, and Pasay, including express services, also use the terminals at Alabang. UV Express routes also ply the city.

Tricycles and pedicabs serve the interior of barangays and residential areas.

"360 Eco-loop" is Filinvest City's fully integrated electric-powered public transport system, which is operated by Filinvest as the main mode of transportation around Filinvest City. "Electric-Jeepney Ride for Free," launched by the City Government of Muntinlupa on March 30, 2015, with an initial fleet of 10 e-jeepneys produced in the Philippines.

=== Rail ===
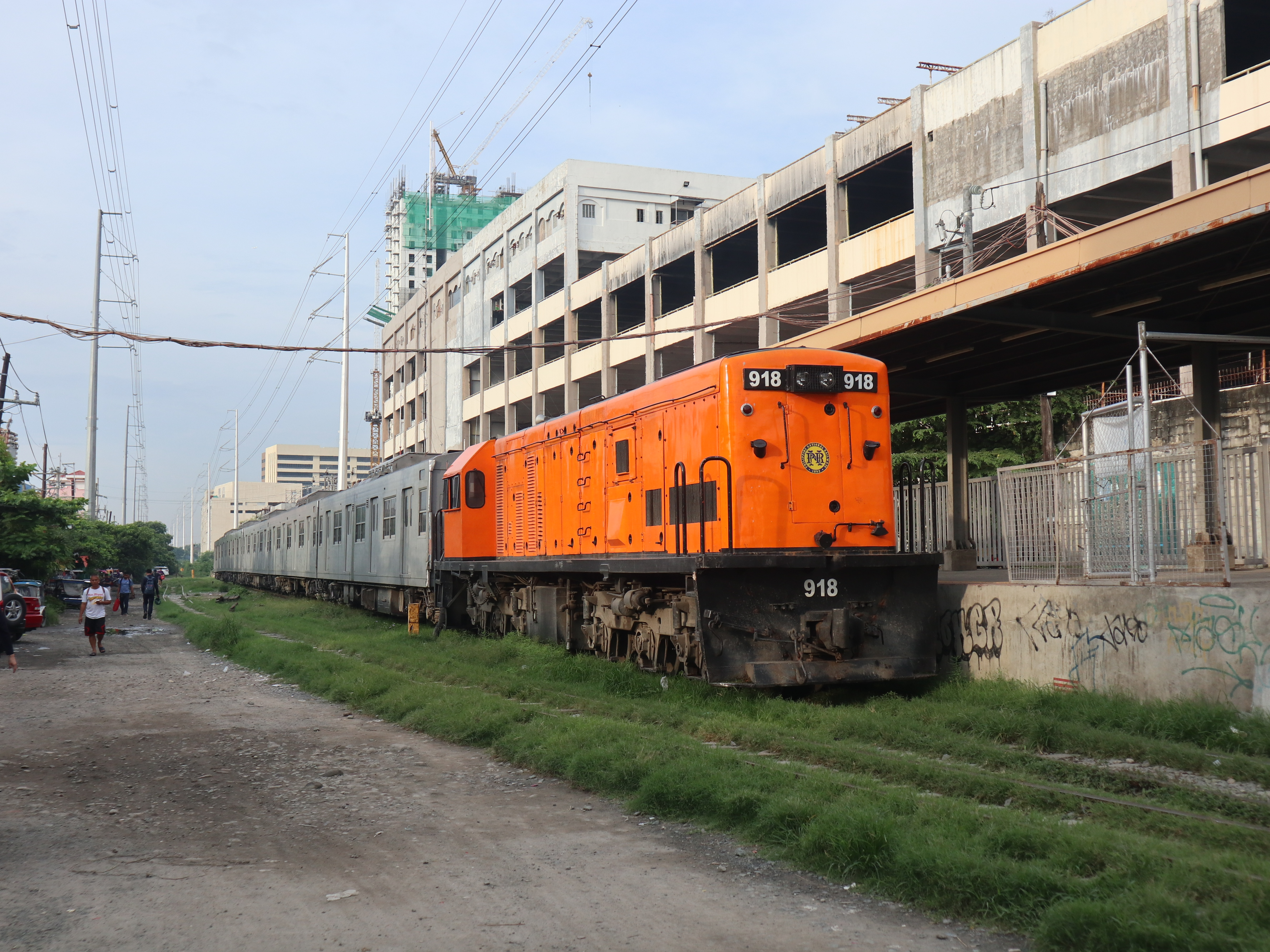
A Philippine National Railways train at Alabang station

The Philippine National Railways (PNR) has three stations in the city: Sucat, Alabang, and Muntinlupa (Poblacion). There used to be stations in Barangay Tunasan and Barangay Buli; however, both were discontinued and demolished in 2009. Before the suspension of operations in 2024, Alabang station was the terminus of the PNR Metro South Commuter services; only select morning and evening trains to and from Calamba stopped at Muntinlupa station.

PNR operations have been suspended since 2024 to give way to the construction of the elevated North–South Commuter Railway, which will have stations at Sucat, Alabang, and Muntinlupa (Poblacion).

=== Roads ===
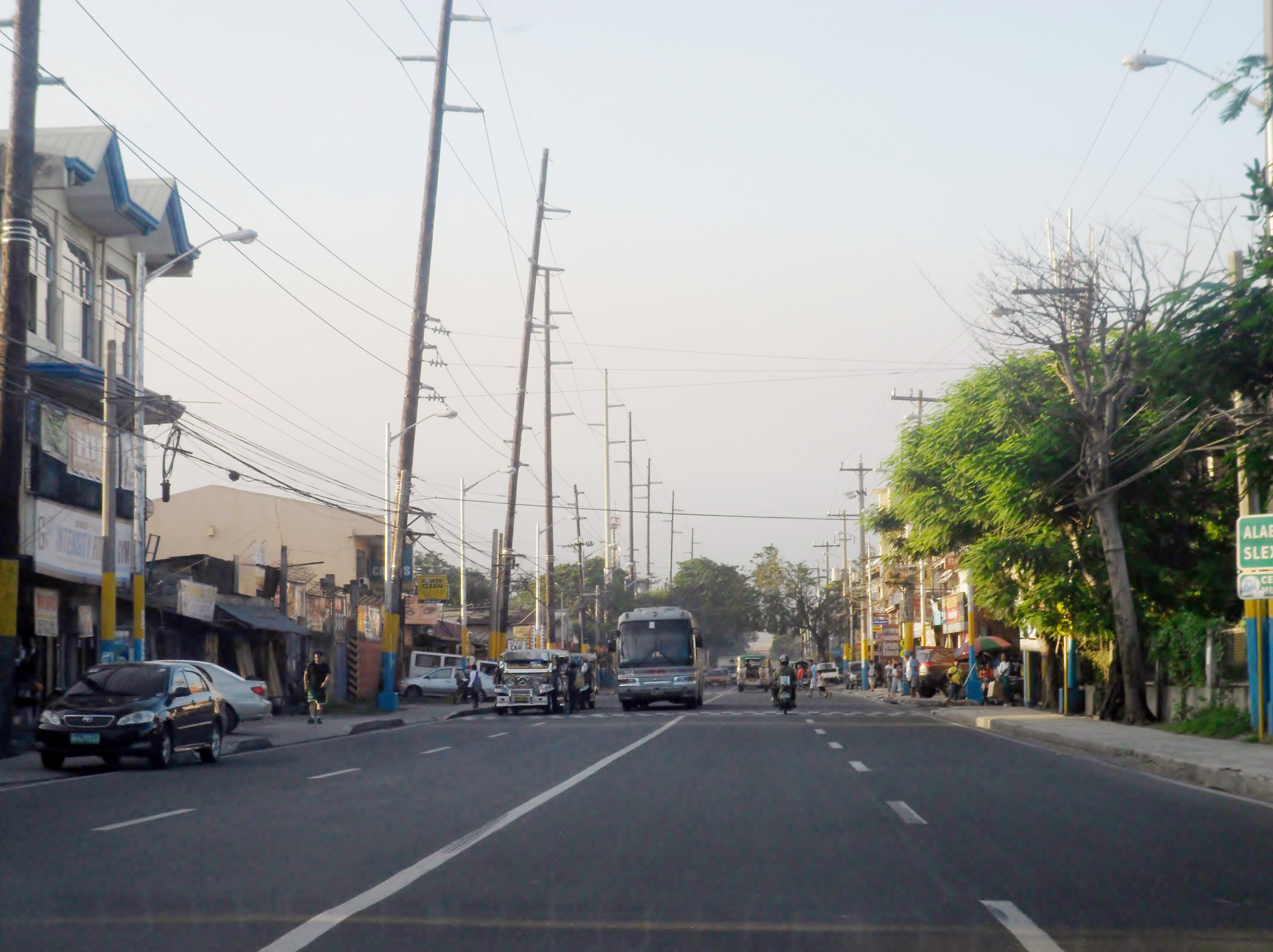
Manila South Road (National Road) in Tunasan

Muntinlupa is served by expressways, national highways, and arterial roads, usually crowded.

National highways serving the city include Maharlika Highway, which parallels the South Luzon Expressway and functions as the city's main artery and Alabang-Zapote Road, formerly known as "Real Street". Daang Hari Road, opened in 2003, lies on the boundary with Las Piñas near Ayala Alabang, Katarungan Village, and New Bilibid Prisons.

Expressways passing through Muntinlupa include the South Luzon Expressway, a part of the Pan-Philippine Highway (AH26) Luzon route, the elevated Skyway, and the Muntinlupa–Cavite Expressway. A proposed expressway, Laguna Lakeshore Expressway Dike, is planned to run along Laguna de Bay from Taguig in Metro Manila to Calamba and Los Baños in Laguna.

Arterial roads serve as the main route from the national roads to the barangays and their residential and commercial areas. A few examples of those roads include Commerce Avenue between Alabang and Ayala Alabang, Corporate Avenue in Filinvest City, Alabang, E. Rodriguez Sr. Avenue in Poblacion, E. Rodriguez Jr. Avenue in Tunasan, San Guillermo Street in Putatan, Montillano Street in Alabang, and Manuel L. Quezon Avenue from Alabang to Sucat and the Taguig city boundary. The arterial roads are usually narrow, crowded with tricycles, pedestrians, and parked vehicles, and have few or no sidewalks, while a few, like Commerce Avenue, have wide divided roads with traffic lights and sidewalks.

== Healthcare ==
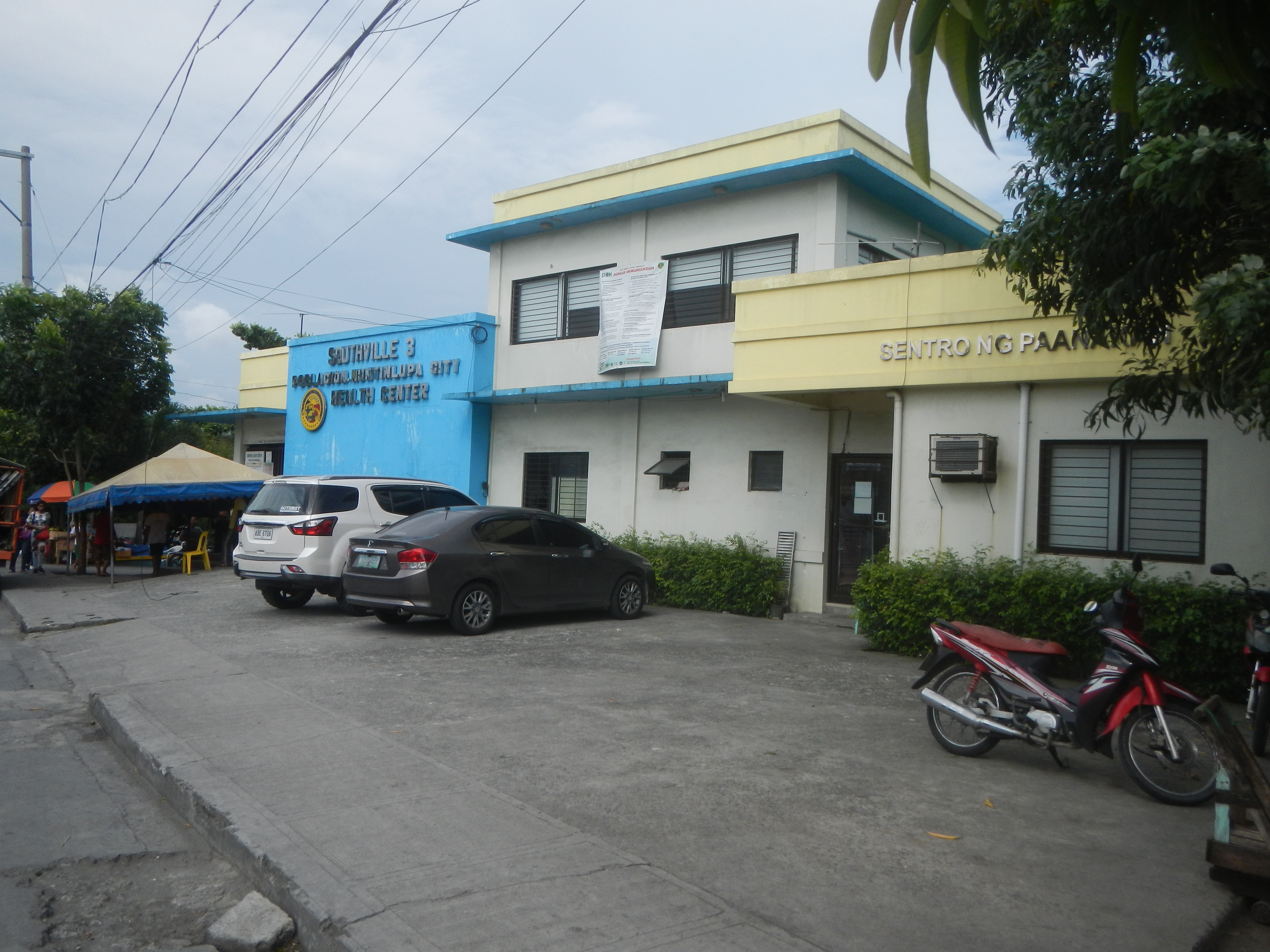
City Health Center at Southville 3, Poblacion

Muntinlupa has 18 health centers, 1 public hospital, and 8 private hospitals. The sole public hospital of the city is the Ospital ng Muntinlupa, while the Asian Hospital and Medical Center and the Medical Center Muntinlupa are among the city's private hospital. The Food and Drug Administration, tasked to ensure the health and safety of food and drugs, has its headquarters located at Filinvest City, Alabang. The Research Institute for Tropical Medicine, a research facility dedicated to infectious and tropical diseases in the Philippines, is also based in Muntinlupa.

== Education ==
Elementary and secondary schools in Muntinlupa are administered by Schools Division Office of Muntinlupa City, a local division of the Department of Education.

Muntinlupa has 89 child development centers (including day care centers, nursery schools and kindergarten schools), 20 public elementary schools, 8 public high schools, 1 public tertiary school, 1 public vocational/technical school, 88 private schools, 10 private tertiary schools and 9 private vocational/technical schools. The "Iskolar ng Bayan" program has been able to give financial assistance to 3,567 students with an allocated budget of ₱13 million. The city search for the Ten Muntinlupa Outstanding Students (MOST) is conducted annually to give recognition and honor to talented and academically excellent students in all public and private high schools of Muntinlupa.

In 2025 Muntinlupa City supported 110,508 scholars with over 94,000 students from elementary to senior high school, over 12,000 college students, and nearly 5,000 postgraduate students. In 2026 the total budget allocation of the Muntinlupa Local Government Unit exceeded 1 billion pesos and was commended by the Second Congressional Commission on Education.

=== Public secondary schools ===
- Muntinlupa National High School is a public high school located at Poblacion, Muntinlupa. MNHS also has a special curriculum, the Science Technology and Engineering or STE (formerly ESEP), that prepares students for careers in Science and Technology, Math, and Communication Arts.
- Muntinlupa Science High School or MunSci is a special public high school in the City of Muntinlupa, Philippines that provides a technical and science curriculum that aims to prepare students for careers in Science and Technology, Math, and Communication Arts. Nihongo and French classes are also offered to students. Classes are taught by teachers from the Japanese and French embassies.
- Pedro E. Diaz High School, formerly Annex of Fort Bonifacio College (FBC), is a public high school located at UP Side Subdivision, Alabang, Muntinlupa.
- Muntinlupa Business High School, formerly known as Pedro E. Diaz High School Annex, is located at Espeleta Street, Buli, Muntinlupa. The school makes education more accessible to students residing at barangays Buli, Cupang and Sucat. MBHS offers a curriculum focused on preparing its graduates into vocational and collegiate degree.
- Bayanan National Highschool, Is a Highschool in Barangay Bayanan.
- Tunasan National High School, also known as Muntinlupa National High School-Tunasan Annex, is the newest public high school, established in 2012 which caters Technical Vocational Courses, TVL Maritime and Humanities and Social Sciences under Academic Track and Grades 7-10 of K–12 curriculum.
- Muntinlupa Business High School - Sucat Annex, Known for its business-oriented and technical-vocational focus, the school offers programs that help prepare learners for higher education. It also promotes holistic development through academic training, extracurricular activities, and community involvement.

=== Public tertiary school ===
- Pamantasan ng Lungsod ng Muntinlupa is a local university in the city that started as a dream of former Mayor Ignacio Bunye who viewed education as potent tool for transforming society for the better. Upon his assumption of office in 1986, he included the objective of organizing and establishing an institution of higher learning in the Ten Point Agenda of his administration. Former Dean Enrico Vivar led the movement to convert the Muntinlupa Polytechnic College into a local university. Atty. Raul R. Corro, then Councilor and Chairman of the Committee on Education, sponsored City Ordinance No. 03-089 converting the Muntinlupa Polytechnic College to a Pamantasan ng Lungsod ng Muntinlupa (PLMun) in March 2003 during the 67th session. The Pamantasan ng Lungsod ng Muntinlupa is now ISO 9001:2008 CERTIFIED by the BRS Rim of the World Operations in California, USA. PLMun was awarded its Certification on April 27, 2015, at the City Hall Quadrangle of the City Government of Muntinlupa.
- Colegio De Muntinlupa is a local government school and CHED-recognized free higher education institution, Colegio de Muntinlupa (CDM) was established to help fill the gap in the science and technology sector of the Philippines. It is Situated in Posadas Avenue in Barangay Sucat and was founded in 2018 with Mayor Jaime Fresnedi overseeing its founding. With its complete and brand-new facilities that meet international standards and high-caliber professors, CDM aims to produce competent nation builders who will be the drivers of sustainable development in the country. Currently, CDM offers five (5) Engineering programs, namely Civil Engineering, Computer Engineering, Electrical Engineering, Electronics Engineering, and Mechanical Engineering. It is also set to offer 5 new programs namely Architecture, Construction Engineering and Management, Environmental Engineering, Industrial Engineering, and Robotics Engineering this coming Academic year 2022-2023. The college is also expecting their first batch of Graduates this 2022.

=== Technical and vocational training ===
- Muntinlupa City Technical Institute (MCTI) offers technical vocational-training of TESDA Accredited Courses. Courses offered in MCTI are Automotive Servicing NC II, Building Wiring Installation NC II, Dressmaking NC II, Food & Beverage Services NC II and Massage Therapy NC II.

=== Alternative learning system ===
- ALS Center Bayanan, formerly Bayanan Elementary School Unit I, conducts Alternative Learning System classes during Saturdays and uses modules that students can answer at home. This program will help them finish secondary education to make them eligible to take courses offered by TESDA or be a college graduate. They will be given certificates by the Department of Education (DepEd) once they finish the program in five months. The project is being implemented by the local DepEd office in coordination with the city government.
- NBP Alternative Learning System is 10-month course offered by the Department of Education (DepEd). Convicts are given a chance to overcome illiteracy or acquire livelihood skills behind bars. This program is made possible by the coordination of Bureau of Corrections with the Department of Education.

== Notable personalities ==
Architecture:

- Francisco Mañosa - National Artist of the Philippines for Architecture

Entertainment personalities:

- Meryll Soriano - Actress
- Vic Sotto - Actor and TV host of Eat Bulaga
- Dong Puno - former news executive of ABS-CBN
- Pauleen Luna - Actress
- Charlene Gonzales - Actress, Beauty Queen
- Jodi Sta. Maria - Actress of ABS-CBN
- Lougee Basabas - Lead Singer of Mojofly
- Boboy Garovillo - Singer
- Champ Lui Pio - Vocalist of HALE Band
- Lea Salonga - Singer
- Ronnie Ricketts - Action film icon
- Dale Baldillo - Child Actor & Socialite-Phlantrophist
- Matteo Guidicelli - Actor, Singer and TV Host
- Sarah Geronimo - Singer, Actress
- Ya Chang - Japanese/Filipino Accent
- Lindsay Custodio - Former Singer
- Karel Marquez - Actress & Model
- Niño Muhlach - Former Child Actor & Director
- Aga Muhlach - Actor
- Alonzo Muhlach - Child Actor
- Lawrence Dela Cruz - Child Actor & Advocate Also As Viva Artist
- Paolo Abrera - TV Host, Triathlete
- Marlo Mortel - Actor
- Sarita Pérez de Tagle - Actress
- Derek Ramsay - Actor
- Janos Delacruz - Painter
- Ernie Baron - former weather broadcaster and inventor of Baron Super Antenna
- Mark Maglasang - previously known as "Bosx1ne" and now known as "Honcho", he is a rapper, founder, and leader of Ex Battalion
- Archie dela Cruz - also known as "Flow-G", rapper and Ex Battalion member
- Allan Paule - actor
- Richard Gutierrez - actor
- Sarah Lahbati - actress
- Jasmine Curtis-Smith - actress, dancer, commercial model, host, endorser, singer
- River Joseph - actor, media personality, businessman
- Antonimar Balila - champion songwriter, also known as Omarr Balila, previously known as Toni Villa an international singer and music producer

Pageants:

- Bea Santiago - Beauty Queen
- Gwennaelle Ruais - Miss Philippines Fire 2010
- Gwen Ruais - Miss World Philippines 2011, Miss World 2011 1st runner-up

Sports people:

- Tim Cone - PBA Coach
- Arwind Santos - PBA Player
- Scottie Thompson - PBA Player
- Troy Rosario - PBA Player
- Kevin Racal - PBA Player
- Ebrahim Enguio Lopez - ABL Player
- Jenny Guerrero - Swimmer
- Padim Israel - former Philippine Basketball Association player who played for Purefoods Hotdogs.
- Rey Evangelista - former Purefoods player
- Robert Jaworski - PBA Legend who played for Toyota Tamaraws and Barangay Ginebra franchises
- Reynel Hugnatan - former PBA Player
- Dennis Miranda - former PBA player and currently assistant coach of FEU Tamaraws
- Gabby Espinas - former PBA player
- Roi Sumang - PBA Player
- Dyan Castillejo - Sports analyst
- Kevin Quiambao - Korean Basketball League Player
- Evan Nelle - PBA Player

Politicians:

- Ruffy Biazon - former congressman, former customs chief, and incumbent mayor of the city
- Rodolfo Biazon - former senator and former congressman of the city
- Ignacio Bunye - former mayor of the city and press secretary
- Jaime Fresnedi - former mayor and incumbent congressman of the city
- Ping Lacson - Senator of the Philippines
- Fidel Ramos - former president
- Ming Ramos - former first lady
- Phanie Teves - vice mayor and former councilor of the city
- Cynthia Villar - former politician
- Enrique Zobel - first Barangay Chairman of Ayala Alabang

== Sister cities ==
=== International ===
Takasaki, Gunma, Japan	(United States) Carson, California, USA	Piteşti, Romania
Liuzhou, China	Staffanstorp, Sweden	

=== National ===
Siruma, Camarines Sur	Calabanga, Camarines Sur	Santa Cruz, Marinduque
Calauag, Quezon	Bangued, Abra	Ozamiz
Pagadian	Iloilo City	

== See also ==
- Metro Manila Skyway
