= Villar City =

- Welcome sign of Villar City at Cavite and Metro Manila

Project
- Other names: Villar Land; Vista Alabang; Vista City; Evia City
- Opening date: 2023; 3 years ago
- Status: in progress
- Developer: Villar Land; Vista Land
- Owner: Villar Land

Physical features
- Major buildings: Evia Lifestyle Center
- Transport: 6 Daang Hari; 32 PITX – Gen M Alvarez; BA VTX – SOMO; BM One Ayala – SOMO; DA VTX – Island Park; DM One Ayala – Rob Dasma

Location
- Mixed-use development
- Country: Philippines
- Location: Cavite and Metro Manila

Area
  - Total: 900 ha (2,200 acres)

Villar City is a mixed-use development in Metro Manila and Cavite jointly developed by Villar Land and Vista Land, consisting of neighborhoods, shopping complexes and office towers. Its landowner, Villar Land, plans it to be an integrated megalopolis with a planned church building, arena, university and golf courses.

== History ==
=== 2021: Reveal ===
As early as December 2021, businessman Manny Villar have revealed plans to create a central business district in the Greater Manila Area. The Villar Group already had pre-existing residential developments such as Camella and Vista Land subdivisions and shopping centers.

Villar City was launched in August 2023 with the inauguration of the 6.2-kilometer (3.9 mi) Villar Avenue. Nearby residents on social media noticed the repeated rebranding of the estate through its welcome marker along Daang Hari from Villar Land to Villar City, as the estate had previously changed its name from Vista Alabang to Villar Land, and from Vista City to Vista Alabang.

=== 2025: Land valuation controversy ===
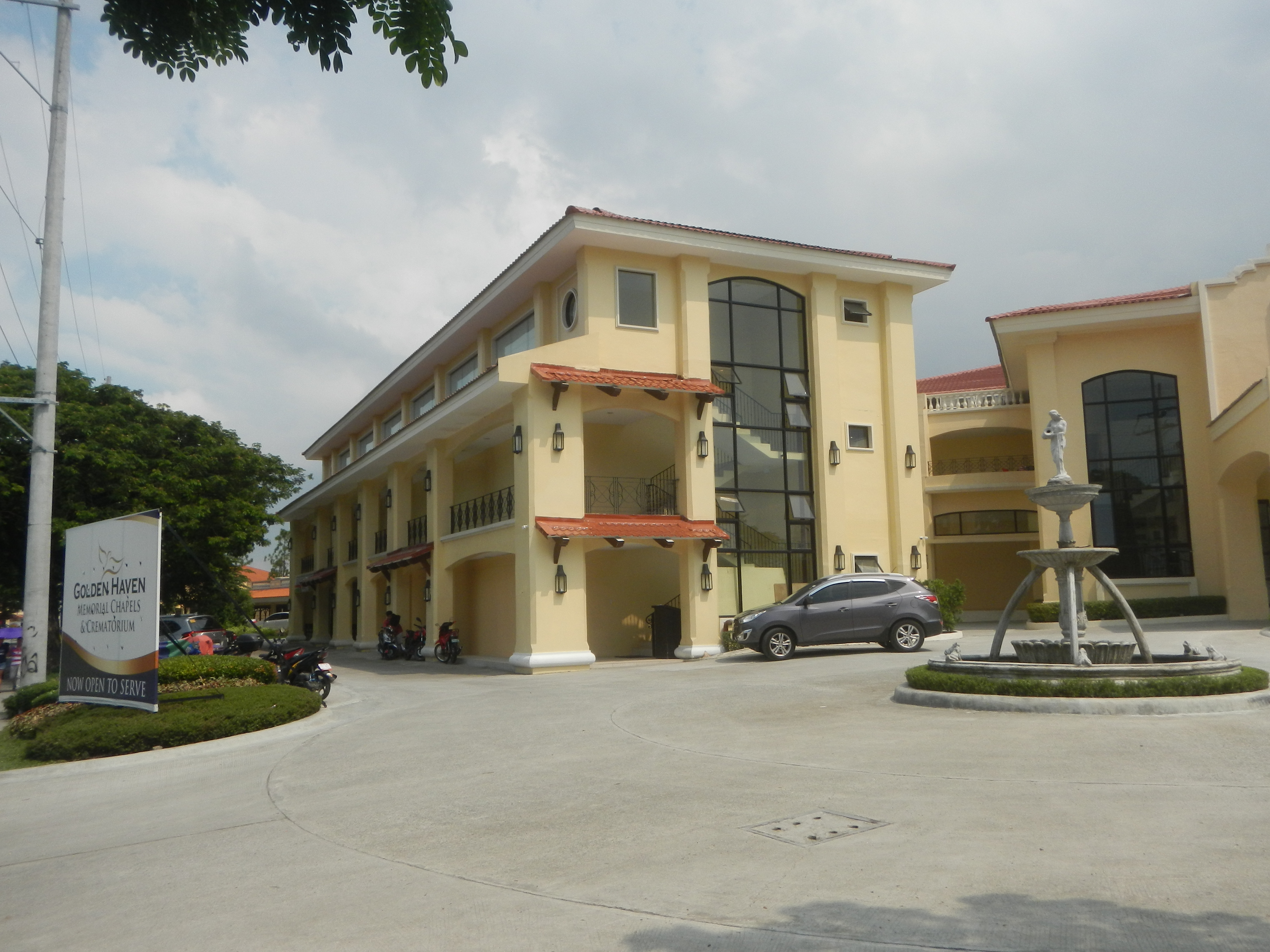
Golden Haven Memorial Park in Las Piñas.

In March 2025, Villar Land declared ₱1.33 trillion profit for 2024 which is largely tied to the Villar City development. However the Securities and Exchange Commission (SEC) determined the actual value to be ₱52.74 billion and revoked the license of E-Value Phils Inc. for failing international standards in appraisal in November 2025.

In January 2026, the Securities and Exchange Commission filed a complaint with the Department of Justice charging Villar Land, its officers and related entities for alleged market manipulation, insider trading and misleading disclosures that distorted the company’s share prices. Among the accused are directors Manny Villar as Villar Land chair; wife Cynthia Villar; their children Paolo Villar, Mark Villar and Camille Villar; directors Cynthia Javarez, Ana Marie Pagsibigan and Garth Castañeda; and company Infra Holdings Corp. and MGS Construction. Camille is additionally accused of insider trading for buying 73,600 Villar Land shares in December 2017 without prompt disclosure that resulted in a jump in the company's share price. Insider trades are not illegal per se in the Philippines, however it has to be disclosed promptly through the relevant facilities such as the EDGE Platform of the Philippine Stock Exchange.

== Scope ==
Described as a "megalopolis" by its proponents, Villar City will cover 3,500 hectares (8,600 acres) spanning 15 municipalities and cities. These are:

Cavite City

- Bacoor City
- Carmona City
- Dasmariñas City
- Imus City
- General Mariano Alvarez
- General Trias City
- Silang
- Tanza
- Trece Martires City
- Tagaytay City

Metro Manila

- Taguig City
- Muntinlupa City
- Las Piñas City
- Parañaque City

Laguna

- San Pedro City

As of 2024, 900 hectares (2,200 acres) of Villar City has been deemed "activated".

== Transportation ==
The 6.2-kilometer (3.9 mi) ten-lane Villar Avenue connects Las Piñas, Bacoor and Dasmariñas. A Bus rapid transit line is planned.

The Muntinlupa–Cavite Expressway is owned by the Prime Asset Ventures of the Villar Group, acquiring it from the Ayala Corporation.

The Villar Group also allegedly tried to take over the construction of the LRT-1 Cavite extension project which saw opposition from Las Piñas councilors.

== Education ==
The University of the Philippines Dasmariñas will be built in University Town situated at the Dasmariñas portion of Villar City.

== Sports ==
A 30,000-square-meter (320,000 sq ft) sports complex which includes the 3,000-seater Villar City Stadium will be built
