= Fine Properties =

Filipino holding company

Fine Properties, Inc.
- Formerly: Adelfa Properties, Inc.
- Company type: Private
- Industry: Holding
- Founded: 1982; 44 years ago
- Headquarters: Las Piñas, Philippines
- Area served: Philippines
- Key people: Manny Villar (principal shareholder); Cynthia Javarez (President); Paolo Villar (Director)
- Owner: Hollinger Holdings Corp.
- Subsidiaries: Villar Land; Vista Land

Fine Properties (officially Fine Properties, Inc.) is a Filipino privately held investment company based in Las Piñas, owned by the family of Manny Villar. It acts as a major holding company in the Villar Group of Companies, serving as the principal shareholder of publicly-listed real estate companies Vista Land and Villar Land.

== History ==
Fine Properties was incorporated in 1982 to serve as a holding company for the interests of Manny Villar and his family.

In April 2013, the Philippine Center for Investigative Journalism (PCIJ) revealed the Villar family's ownership of British Virgin Islands-based holding company Awesome Dragon Holdings Limited. While Villar claimed that Awesome Dragon Holdings was owned by Fine Properties, the PCIJ stated that Villar himself was named in the company data sheet as the beneficial owner.

In May 2023, a summary of tax delinquents prepared by the Las Piñas city assessor's office showed Fine Properties failing to pay real property taxes from 2018.

In October 2024, Fine Properties subsidiary Villar Land purchased 396.88 hectares of prime land in Villar City, partly through the full acquisition of sister companies Chalgrove Properties, Inc. and Los Valores Corporation, making them second-tier subsidiaries thereof, and partly by acquiring Fine Properties sister company Althorp Land Holdings, Inc.

In March 2026, a certain landowner identifying as from the Alonzo family in Molino VI, Bacoor, Cavite, alleged that Cynthia Villar claimed ownership of the Moonwalk Property, which the family had lived on and tilled as farmland, with Villar personally coming into their property and telling them that "nabili ko na 'to" (English: I've already bought this), despite their existing land title. He also claimed that security guards affiliated with the group allegedly broke their fences and that their property was being surveyed from end to end during the construction of a bypass road parallel to the Zapote River. Villar denied claims she purchased the Moonwalk Property, stating that a certain Moonwalk Development and Housing Corporation owned it for ≥38 years until Fine Properties acquired it from Moonwalk. Villar added that the lots the Alonzo family had lived on were rezoned as non-agricultural prior to the enactment of the Comprehensive Agrarian Reform Program, and that Alonzo was party to a dispute that resolved in favor of Moonwalk.

== Subsidiaries ==
=== Awesome Dragon Holdings ===
Awesome Dragon Holdings Limited is a dormant shell company owned by Fine Properties, founded in 2007 to serve as a ready corporate vehicle for any strategic multinational business opportunity for the Villar Group.

=== Villar Land ===
Villar Land Holdings Corporation (PSE: VLC; formerly Golden MV Holdings, Inc., Golden Bria Holdings, Inc., Golden Haven, Inc. and Golden Haven Memorial Parks, Inc.) is a Philippine holding company with stakes on real estate and death care industries. It is associated with Manny Villar.

=== Vista Land ===
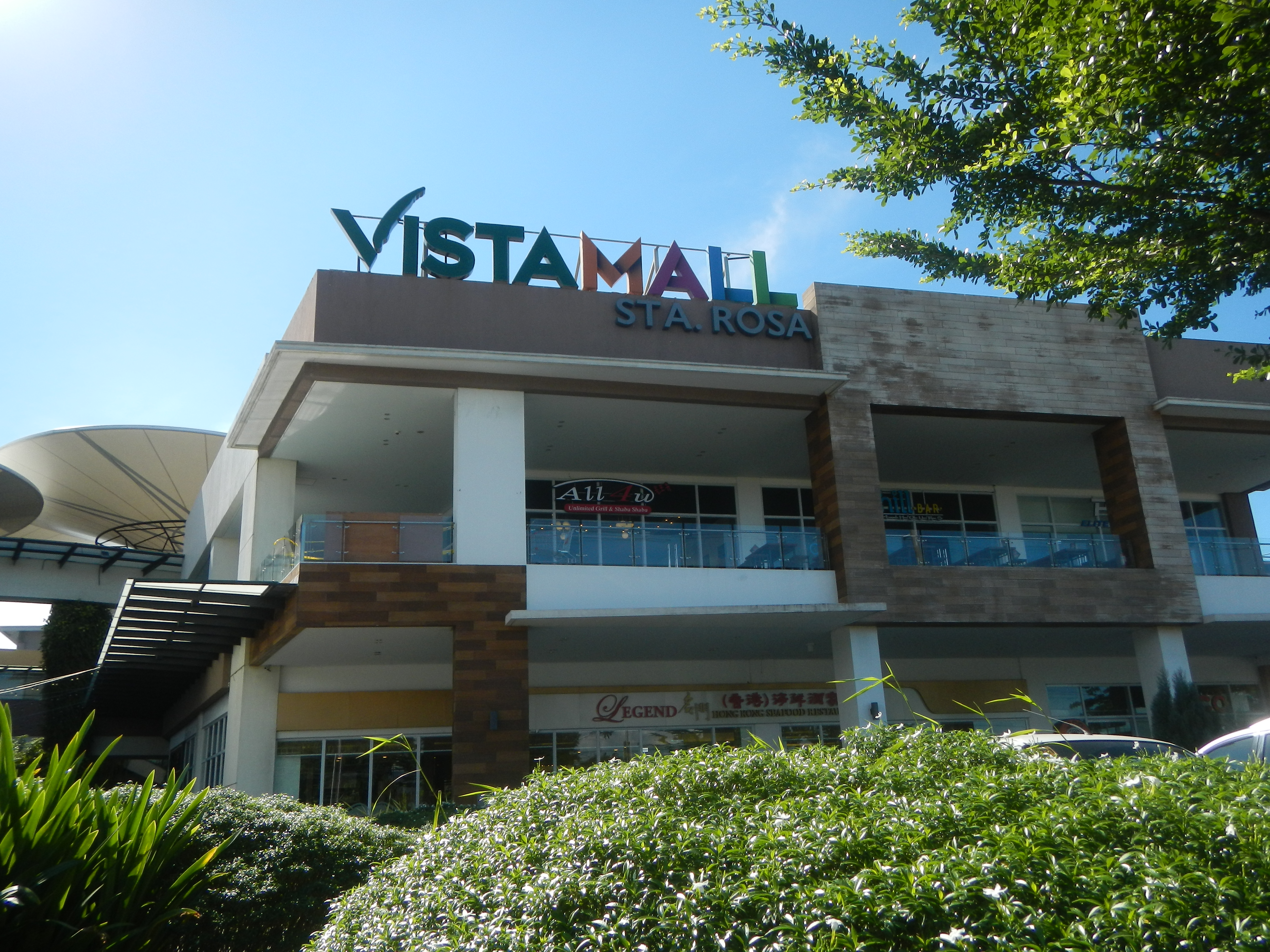
Vista Mall Santa Rosa

Vista Land & Lifescapes Inc. also known as simply Vista Land, is a property developer in the Philippines engaged in the real estate and retail industries. The company is part of the Villar Group of Companies associated with Manny Villar, along with the Starmalls, Inc. and Golden Haven, Inc.
