= Molino–Daang Hari Flyover =

Flyover in Cavite, Philippines

- Great Wall of Bacoor; Molino Flyover
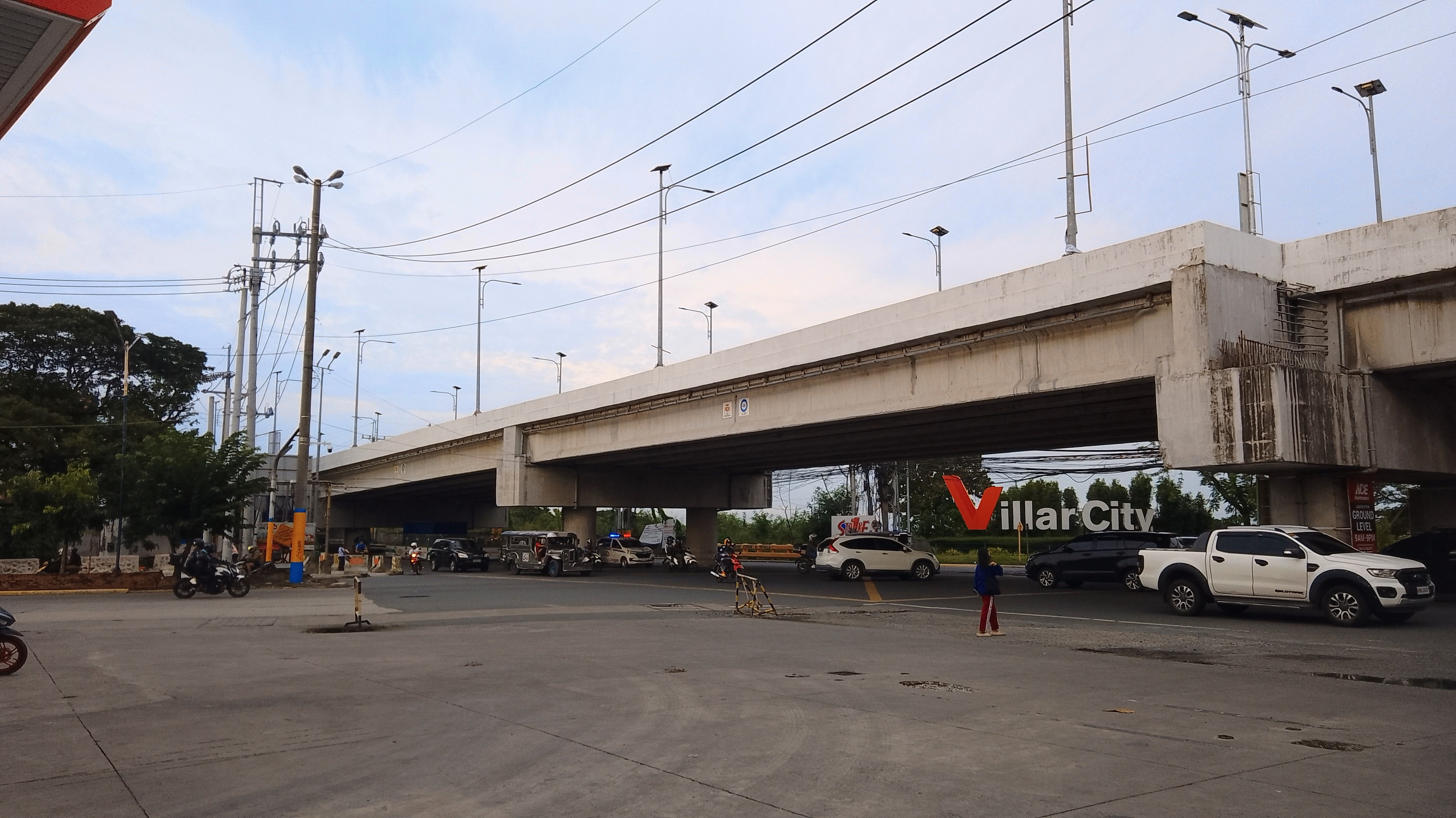
- The Molino–Daang Hari Flyover over Daang Hari Road
- Interactive map of Molino–Daang Hari Flyover

Location
- Bacoor, Cavite, Philippines
- Coordinates: 14°23′10.3″N 120°58′40.3″E
- Roads at junction: Molino Road; Molino–Paliparan Road; Daang Hari Road

Construction
- Type: Two-level flyover
- Constructed: 2019
- Opened: December 15, 2023
- Maintained by: Department of Public Works and Highways

Molino–Daang Hari Flyover, also known as Molino Flyover, is a flyover in Bacoor, Cavite, Philippines, connecting Molino Road to Molino–Paliparan Road to ease traffic congestion in the rapidly developing southern corridor of Cavite and southern Metro Manila. The structure gained widespread public attention due to its prolonged construction period and right-of-way issues, which caused significant delays and traffic disruptions, earning it the nickname "Great Wall of Bacoor" on social media. It was later completed and opened to motorists as part of efforts to improve connectivity and traffic flow in the area.

== Names ==
The flyover is officially known as the Molino–Daang Hari Flyover. It has also been referred to as the Molino Flyover by the Bacoor City government. Before its construction, the proposed flyover was referred to as the Bacoor Flyover. Due to several years of delayed construction, including issues with right-of-way acquisition, the project took longer to complete than originally planned. The extended construction period contributed to heavy traffic along the area, leading locals and social media users to nickname it the "Great Wall of Bacoor" or the "Great Wall of Molino."

== History ==
Traffic congestion at the intersection of Molino Road and Daang Hari Road in Bacoor, Cavite, was a major problem for commuters and transport operators, with travel times increasing from one hour to two or three hours during peak periods. Residents and drivers appealed to the national and local government to address the worsening traffic, highlighting the intersection as a key choke point. According to Romeo M. Sobrepena, president of the National Federation of AUV Operators and Drivers Association of the Philippines, a flyover had been previously planned for this intersection but was never implemented. The project was later reconsidered under infrastructure initiatives like the "Build, Build, Build" program to improve transport efficiency and alleviate congestion, benefiting both Metro Manila commuters and residents of adjacent provinces such as Cavite, Bulacan, and Rizal.

In 2017, Cavite Representative Strike Revilla met separately with Public Works Secretary Mark Villar and DPWH Undersecretary Catalina Cabral to discuss the proposed flyover at the intersection of Molino Boulevard and Daang Hari in Bacoor, Cavite. The meetings covered the project's proposed ₱240-million allocation, additional funding for its revised design, and other concerns including drainage and evacuation centers. Revilla said the project would help ease traffic congestion affecting commuters in Bacoor and Las Piñas.

Construction of the Molino–Daang Hari Flyover in Bacoor, Cavite began in 2019 during the tenure of then-Mayor Lani M. Revilla. On August 2, 2021, Mayor Strike B. Revilla signed a memorandum of agreement securing ₱500 million from the Department of Public Works and Highways (DPWH) for right-of-way acquisition. By October 26, 2021, the Cavite 3rd District Engineering Office was requested to expedite the project’s completion within the year. The City of Bacoor partnered with the DPWH and SM Group to enhance construction, while local officials, including barangay captains and Sangguniang Panlungsod members, coordinated to support the project.

Construction of the Molino–Daang Hari Flyover was temporarily postponed due to community quarantine measures imposed in the Philippines during the COVID-19 pandemic. Work on the project later resumed on June 6, 2020, as public and private partners adjusted to health protocols and sought to continue infrastructure development despite the ongoing crisis.

On March 16, 2021, Bacoor Mayor Lani Mercado-Revilla led a meeting regarding the flyover, attended by City Administrator Jerome Oliveros, BTMD Head Gerry Del Rosario, City Engineering Office Engineer Jicky Jutba, Molino V Barangay Captain Horacio Brilliantes, as well as representatives from DPWH Region 4-A, Vista Mall, SM Molino, Globe Bacoor, Meralco Bacoor, Citihomes HOA, Vallejo 4 HOA, Mosaito HOA, and the City of Imus.

On January 25, 2022, the CALABARZON Regional Project Monitoring Committee (RPMC) conducted problem-solving sessions via Zoom to address implementation issues for the Molino–Daang Hari Flyover and the Pulo–Diezmo Road projects. The Molino–Daang Hari Flyover Project, which involves the construction of 806-meter flyover structure crossing Daang Hari along Molino Road in Bacoor, Cavite, had experienced delays due to obstructive electric utility poles within the road right-of-way (RROW). Bacoor City Mayor Lani Mercado-Revilla coordinated with the electric utility company to resolve the issue, allowing construction to resume in February 2022. The project aimed to alleviate congestion at the intersection of Molino Road and Daang Hari Road, with SM Mall identified as a key beneficiary and providing funding for an extension. The DPWH Region IV-A allocated budgets for RROW acquisition and road widening to support the project’s completion.

The 531-meter Molino–Daang Hari Flyover in Bacoor, Cavite was inaugurated on December 12, 2023, and opened to vehicular traffic three days later, on December 15, 2023.

Present at the blessing and inauguration ceremony on December 12, 2023 were Bacoor City Mayor Strike B. Revilla, Cavite 2nd District Representative Lani Mercado‑Revilla, Agimat Partylist Representative Bryan Revilla, Department of Public Works and Highways Undersecretary Roberto R. Bernardo, DPWH Region IV‑A Regional Director Jovel G. Mendoza, and SM Supermalls Assistant Vice President for Operations Lorenzo Leon A. Calingasan IV.

== Incidents ==
On November 3, 2026, the flyover was temporarily closed following a pursuit and exchange of gunfire between local police and suspected members of an armed robbery group, which resulted in the suspects' getaway vehicle overturning on the structure and five suspects killed across subsequent encounters.
