= Evia Lifestyle Center =

Shopping center in Las Piñas, Philippines

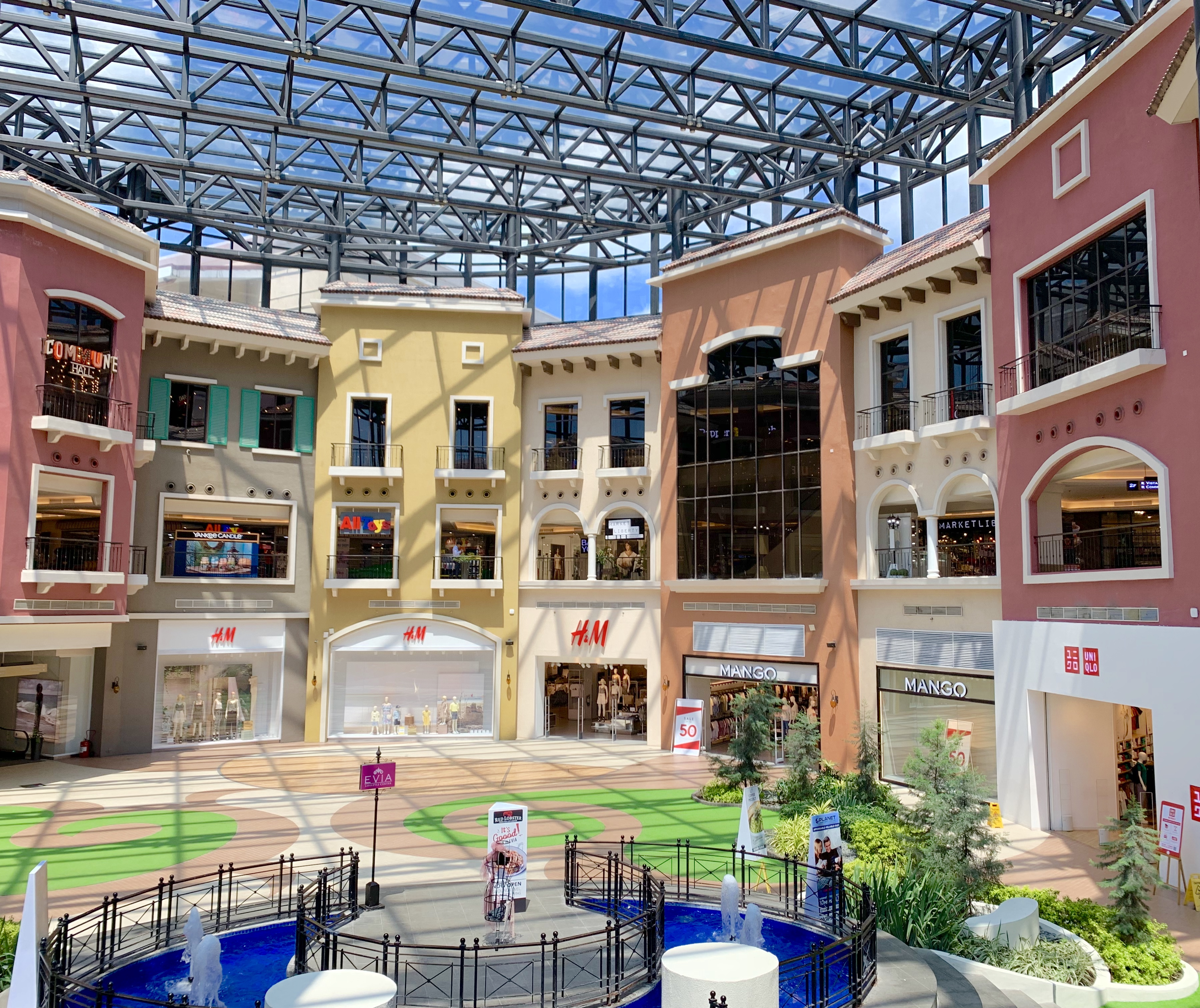
- Location: Las Piñas, Metro Manila, Philippines
- Coordinates: 14°22′34″N 121°00′41″E
- Address: Daang Hari, Almanza Dos
- Opened: 2012; 14 years ago
- Owner: Vista Land
- Num. of stores: 200+
- Floor area: 120,000 square metres (1,300,000 sq ft)
- Floors: Bldgs. A & B: 3 (including 1 basement); Bldg. C: 4 (including 1 basement); North Wing: 6 (incl. 2 Basement Parking)
- Public transit: T409 VTX – Katarungan; T427 VTX – SM Molino; BA VTX – SOMO; BM Makati – SOMO; DA VTX – Island Park; DM Makati – Rob Dasma
- Website: www.vistamalls.com.ph

Evia Lifestyle Center is a shopping lifestyle center located along Daang Hari Road in Las Piñas, Metro Manila, Philippines. It was opened in 2012, is owned by Vista Land and is owned and operated by Vista Malls.

It has a total of 120,000 m^{2} (1,300,000 sq ft) of retail space and has a number of high-end retail stores including All Day Supermarket, AllHome and a number of fashion brands, including H&M and Uniqlo. Evia Lifestyle Center caters to the retail needs of citizens living in Las Piñas, Parañaque, Muntinlupa, Laguna, and Cavite provinces.

== Etymology ==
Evia, short for Pontevia, or Bridgeway, is a reference to the location of the heart of Vista Alabang, set on a central bridge point that joins all the parts of Vista Alabang.

== History ==
Evia Lifestyle Center was founded in 2012 with the main goal to bring a shopping mall near the Vista community, the company has been aggressively expanding its retail businesses that include AllHome, which is expected to reach 40 stores by year-end; Market Liberty, which offers a platform for local entrepreneurs to expand their businesses; Coffee Project, dubbed as the most Instagrammable coffee shop in the Philippines, and which will soon house bookstores in select branches; Bake My Day; All Toys; All Sports; Kinder City; and All Day Supermarket, which has Paluto and Gastroville.

== Features ==
=== MX4D cinema ===
The MX4D cinema at the third floor opened on February 10, 2016, along with a VIP cinema and 2 Dolby Atmos theaters. The MX4D cinema is the only 4D cinema in the South of Metro Manila, and the fifth 4D cinema in the country after the 4DX cinemas in Greenbelt 3, U.P. Town Center and Bonifacio High Street, and the XD Cinema in SM Mall of Asia which was now closed.

=== IMAX with Laser ===
The IMAX with Laser opened on November 19, 2018, along with the opening of three more additional cinemas, and it is located at the fourth floor of the expansion wing. It comes with a next-generation laser projector, with vivid colors, deeper contrast, higher resolution, sharper images, and a brighter screen. It's also equipped with 12-channel sound technology that has a greater dynamic range. It is the first IMAX with Laser in Southeast Asia. This is also the ninth IMAX cinema in the country, the first IMAX cinema not operated by SM Cinema, after its last opening in SM Megamall on January 28, 2014, and the second IMAX cinema in Las Piñas, after SM Southmall that opened on July 14, 2011, that it is in digital projection.

== Incidents ==
- July 10, 2015: A couple was found dead at the mall's open parking lot. Police identified a bank manager aged 51 and her husband, a sales manager of a pharmaceutical company, aged 50. The mall security guard said he was doing his rounds at the parking lot of the mall at around 7:35 p.m. when he spotted the male person laying unconscious on the ground behind a Toyota Innova car.

== See also ==
- Vista Malls
- List of shopping malls in Metro Manila
