= Villar Land =

Philippine holding company

Villar Land Holdings Corp.
- Formerly: Golden MV Holdings, Inc.; Golden Bria Holdings, Inc.; Golden Haven, Inc.; Golden Haven Memorial Parks, Inc.
- Company type: Public
- Traded as: PSE: HVN
- Industry: Real estate, death care
- Founded: November 16, 1982; 43 years ago
- Headquarters: Las Piñas, Metro Manila, Philippines
- Number of locations: 30 housing developments 8 columbaria
- Area served: Philippines
- Key people: Manny Villar (chairman); Maribeth Tolentino (president)
- Brands: Golden Haven; Bria Homes
- Owners: Fine Properties (63.97%); Cambridge Group (24.65%); Others (11.38%)
- Subsidiaries: Bria Homes, Inc.
- Website: www1.goldenhaven.com.ph/about-us/

Villar Land Holdings Corporation (PSE: VLC; formerly Golden MV Holdings, Inc., Golden Bria Holdings, Inc., Golden Haven, Inc. and Golden Haven Memorial Parks, Inc.) is a Philippine holding company with stakes on real estate and death care industries. It is associated with Manny Villar.

== History ==
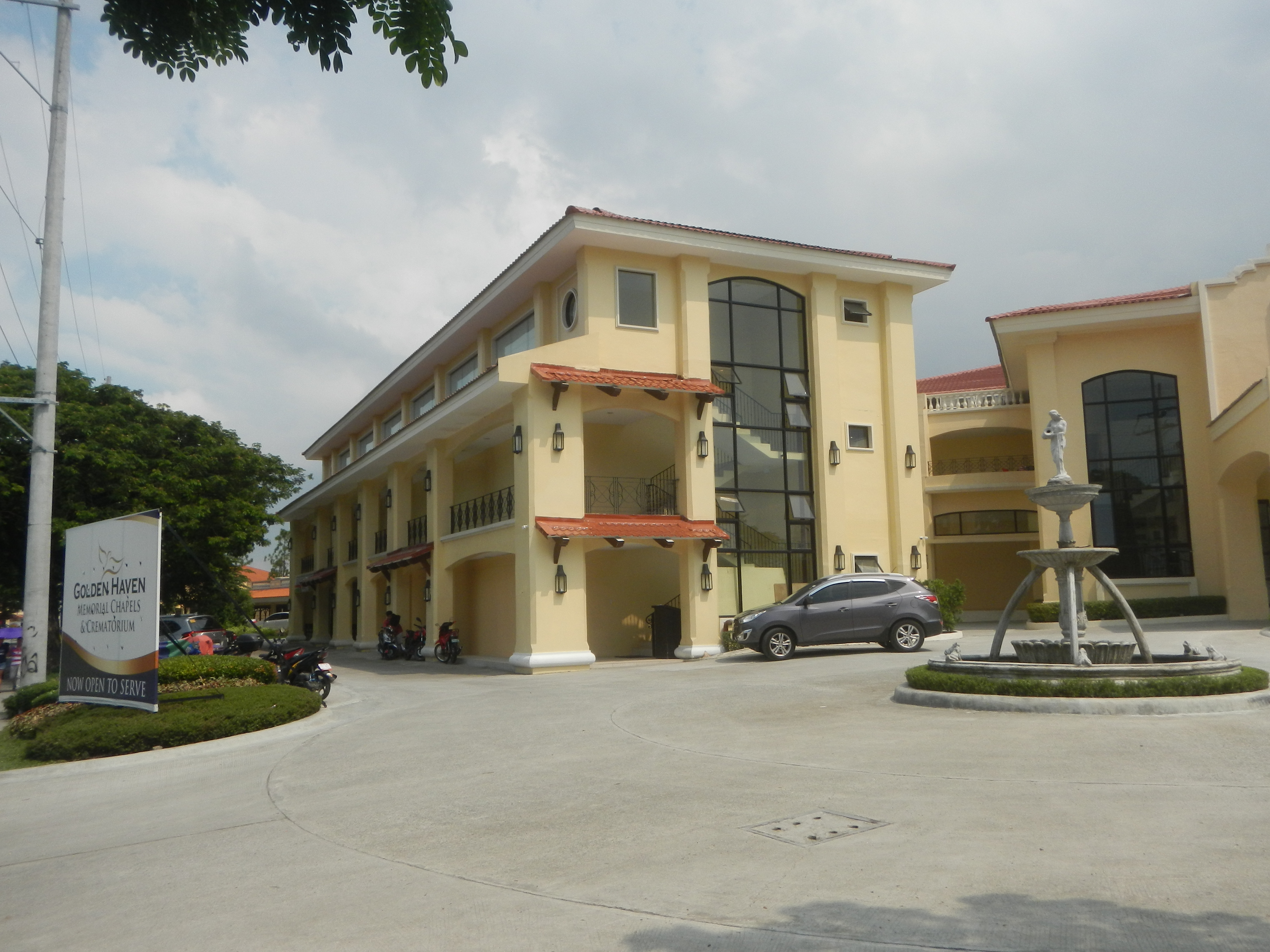
Golden Haven Memorial Park in Las Piñas.

Golden MV Holdings was incorporated on November 16, 1982. It initially began solely as a company which develops and manages columbaria in the Philippines. The first Golden Haven Memorial Park was established in 1984 in a 2 hectares (4.9 acres) lot in Las Piñas. The enterprise is associated with businessman and politician Manny Villar.

In 2016, Golden Haven Memorial Parks, Inc. was listed in the Philippine Stock Exchange and dropped "Memorial Parks" from its name.

In 2017, the company expanded to the mass housing after it started acquiring Bria Homes Inc. for around ₱3 billion from Cambridge Group, Inc. which is also a Villar company. It renamed itself from Golden Haven Inc. to Golden Bria Holdings in the following year. It adopted the Golden MV name in 2020.

In October 2024, Golden MV obtained several lots of lands which will be part of the Villar City development. It has surpassed SM Investments and SM Prime in market value at ₱1.29 trillion. The following month, it was announced that the company will be renamed Villar Land Holdings Corp. It decided to change its PSE stock ticker from PSE: HVN to PSE: VLC in December of that year. As of December 2025, the stock ticker remains HVN.

In March 2025, Villar Land declared ₱1.33 trillion profit for 2024 which is largely tied to the Villar City development. However the Securities and Exchange Commission (SEC) determined the actual value to be ₱52.74 billion and revoked the license of E-Value Phils Inc. for failing international standards in appraisal in November 2025.

In January 2026, the Securities and Exchange Commission filed a complaint with the Department of Justice charging Villar Land, its officers and related entities for alleged market manipulation, insider trading and misleading disclosures that distorted the company’s share prices. Among the accused are directors Manny Villar as Villar Land chair; wife Cynthia Villar; their children Paolo Villar, Mark Villar and Camille Villar; directors Cynthia Javarez, Ana Marie Pagsibigan and Garth Castañeda; and company Infra Holdings Corp. and MGS Construction. Camille is additionally accused of insider trading for buying 73,600 Villar Land shares in December 2017 without prompt disclosure that resulted in a jump in the company's share price. Insider trades are not illegal per se in the Philippines, however it has to be disclosed promptly through the relevant facilities such as the EDGE Platform of the Philippine Stock Exchange.

== Components ==
=== Golden Haven ===
Golden Haven is a chain of columbaria in the Philippines. Its main facility is the Golden Haven Las Piñas.

=== Bria Homes ===
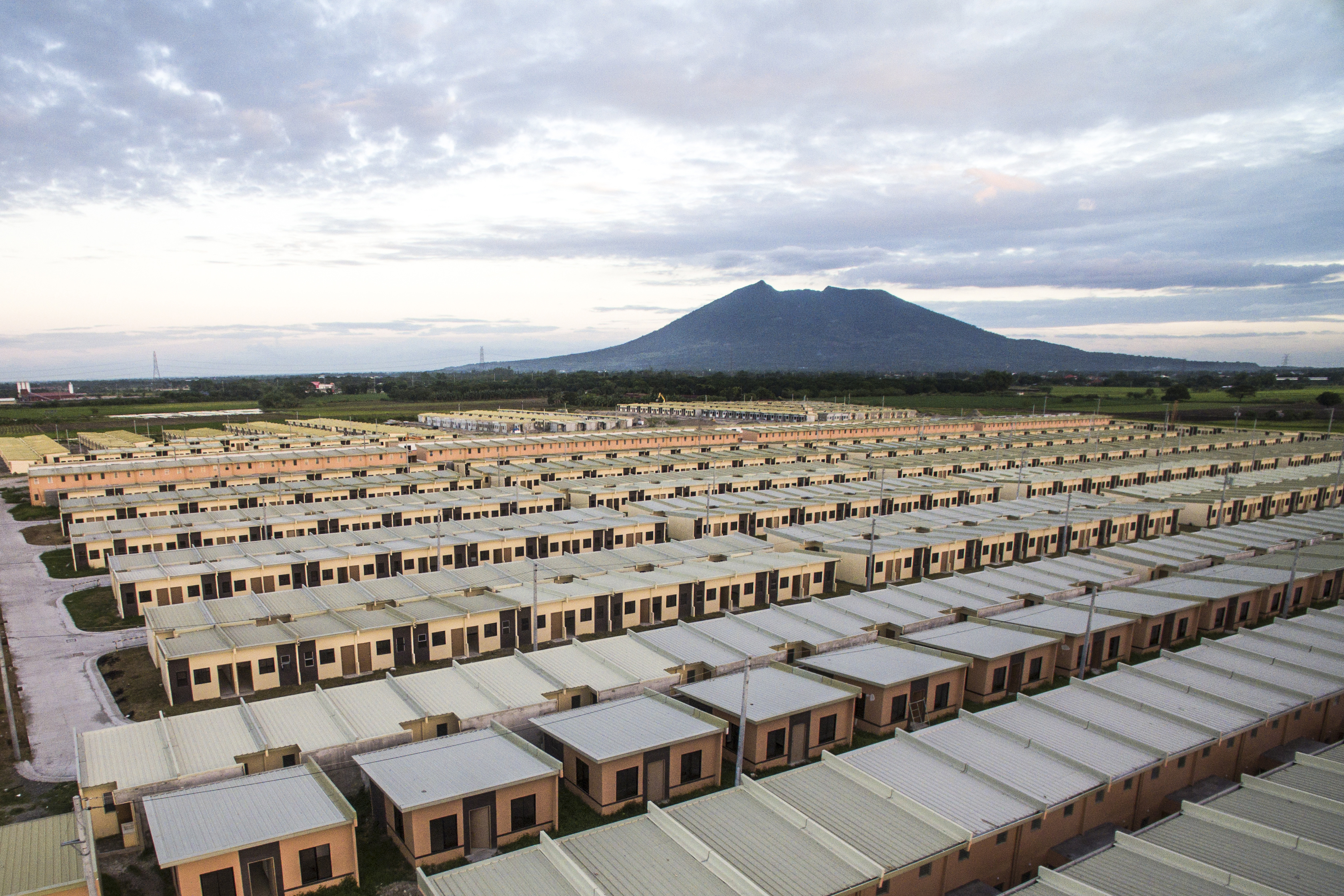
Bria Homes Magalang in Pampanga.

Bria Homes (stylized as BRIA) was incorporated in 2009. It develops residential subdivisions under its brand. Since 2017, it is a subsidiary of Villar Land Holdings.

In 2020, it has expanded to building mid-rise condominiums.

=== Villar City ===
Villar City is a mixed-use development in Metro Manila and Cavite jointly developed by Villar Land and Vista Land, consisting of neighborhoods, shopping complexes and office towers. Its landowner, Villar Land, plans it to be an integrated megalopolis with a planned church building, arena, university and golf courses.
