= Starmall Alabang fire =

2022 fire in Muntinlupa, Philippines

- Date: January 8, 2022; 4 years ago
- Duration: 33 hours
- Venue: Starmall Alabang
- Location: Alabang, Muntinlupa, Metro Manila, Philippines
- Type: Fire
- Cause: Undisclosed
- Outcome: 80 percent of Starmall Alabang burned
- Deaths: None
- Property damage: ₱100 million (US$1.73 million)

A fire at Starmall Alabang, a shopping mall in Alabang, Muntinlupa, Metro Manila, Philippines, occurred at 3:00 a.m. on January 8, 2022. Although there were no reported casualties, 80 percent of the establishment was confirmed to have been damaged by the fire, the cost of which was estimated to be ₱100 million (US$1.73 million). The management of Starmall Alabang announced that it was declared fire out the next day at 12:21 p.m.

== Incident ==
The fire started at 3:00 a.m., according to the Muntinlupa City Department of Disaster Resilience and Management. The first alarm was raised at 3:40 a.m., followed by a second alarm raised at 4:03 a.m., and a third alarm at 7:13 a.m.

The Metro Manila Development Authority reported at around 9:00 a.m. that several fire trucks responded under Task Force Alpha when the blaze was at the fifth alarm at 7:46 a.m. The incident is visible at the Skyway and South Luzon Expressway. Reports also stated that the fire started on the mall's second floor or at the lower ground floor and reached the AllHome section on the ground floor.

As of 5:05 p.m., there were 226 fire trucks and 9 ambulances from the Bureau of Fire Protection (BFP) and volunteers that responded. Five people were reportedly injured (4 firefighters and 1 volunteer).

Firefighters declared that the mall had been fire out on the next day (January 9, 2022) at 12:21 p.m. Around 245 fire trucks and 1,082 firefighters were involved in putting out the fire.

== Aftermath ==
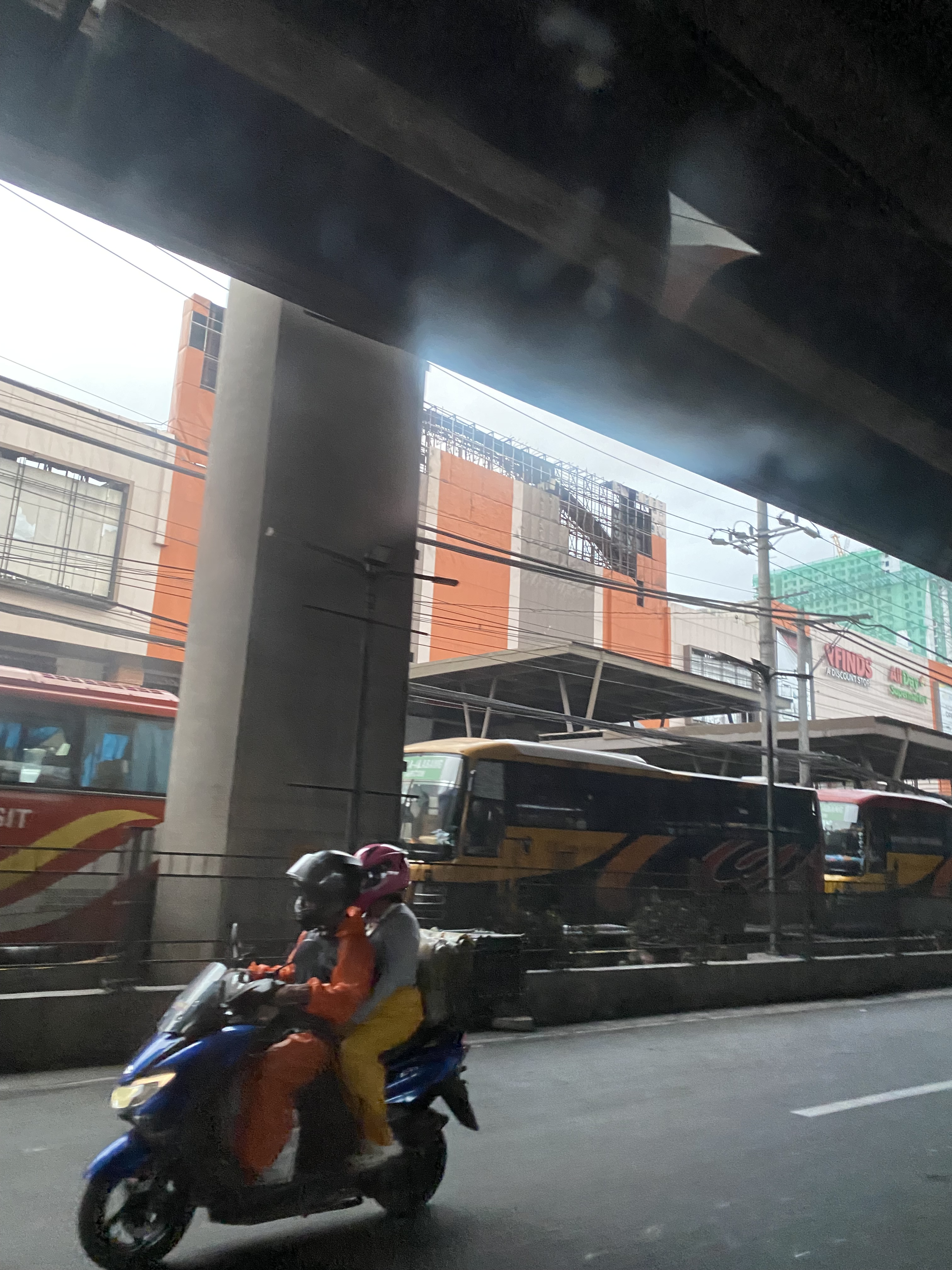
Starmall Alabang after the fire.

Around 80 percent of Starmall Alabang was destroyed by the fire. The management estimates that the fire caused ₱100 million (US$1.73 million) worth of damage. The mall's Facebook page released a statement that they are grateful to the fire brigades and volunteers from Metro Manila and Cavite for responding the incident.

The owner of the mall and former Senator Manny Villar also addressed their concerns to the coordinating tenants of the mall. He was also happy that his renovated historic red truck survived the incident. He also said that the historic red truck was where he started his business in 1975. “This is one of the two reconditioned red trucks I bought and started my business with in 1975. We had it displayed in one of our malls hoping to inspire people of the successful journey it had with me.”, he said on his Facebook post.

In November 2023, 22 months after the incident, the mall was demolished to make way for The Terminal and VTX (Vista Integrated Terminal Exchange). The Terminal is a strip mall under Vista Malls that opened on November 22, 2024.

== See also ==
- List of fires
- Other notable fires in the Philippines
  - Ozone Disco fire, 1996, 162 dead
  - Kentex slipper factory fire, 2015, 74 dead
  - 2017 Davao City mall fire, 39 dead
  - Star City fire, 2019, no casualties
