= Starmalls =

Shopping mall chain in the Philippines

Starmalls, Inc.
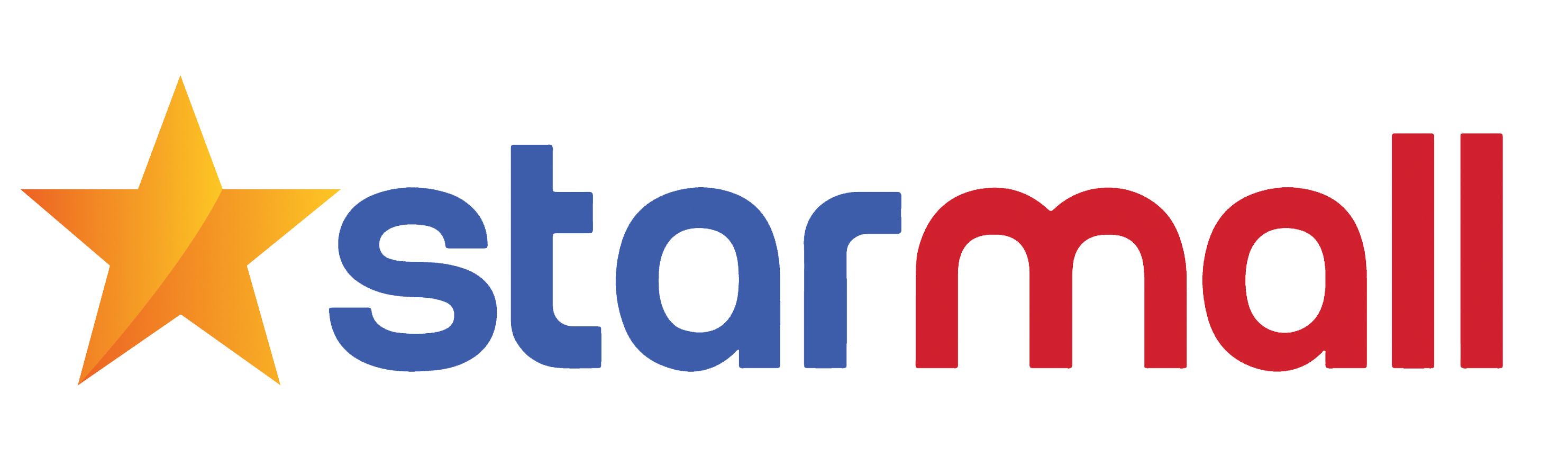
- Company type: Subsidiary
- Traded as: PSE: STR
- Predecessor: Polar Property Holdings Corp.
- Founded: 1969; 57 years ago June 22, 2012; 13 years ago (as Starmalls)
- Headquarters: Mandaluyong, Philippines
- Number of locations: 12
- Area served: Philippines
- Key people: Manuel "Manny" B. Villar Jr. (Chairman); Manuel "Paolo" A. Villar III (Vice Chairman); Benjamarie Therese Serrano (President)
- Parent: Vista Land
- Website: starmalls.com.ph

Starmalls is one of the two retail arms of the Filipino real estate company Vista Land, the other being Vista Malls. Starmalls operates shopping malls and BPO chains in Mega Manila and Cebu.

== History ==
Starmalls began as Polar Mines and Development Corporation on October 16, 1969. Polar Mines became Polar Property Holdings Corporation after shifting industries from mining to real estate. It was approved by the Securities and Exchange Commission (SEC) in September 2004. Polar Property became Starmalls on June 22, 2012. On September 17, 2019, SEC approved the change in corporate name to Vistamalls, Inc.

=== Starmall Prima ===
Starmall Prima was initially created to cater to higher-income customers and its first mall was inaugurated in Taguig in 2014. By 2015, Starmall Prima became Vista Malls.

== Outlets ==
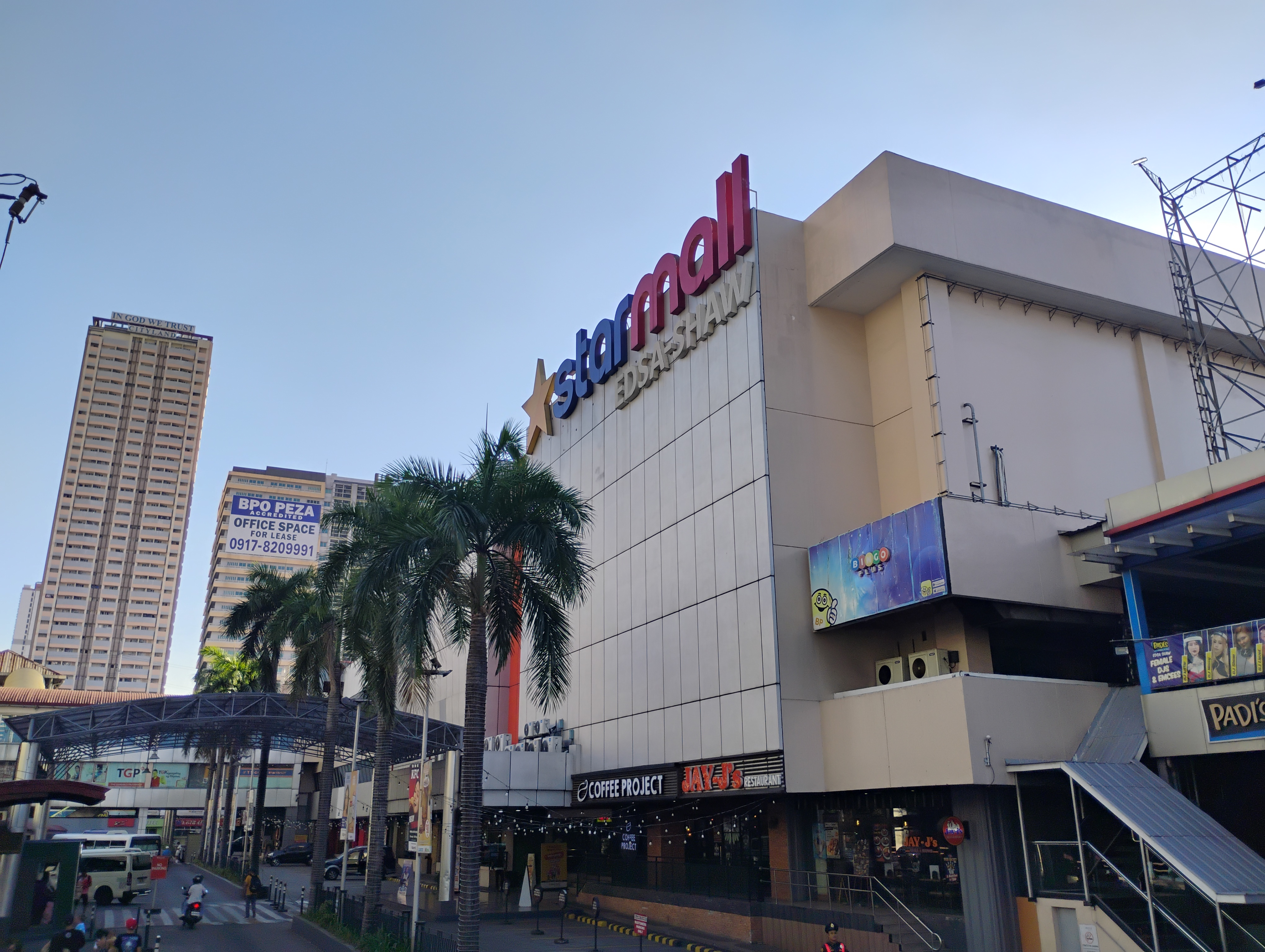
Starmall EDSA-Shaw

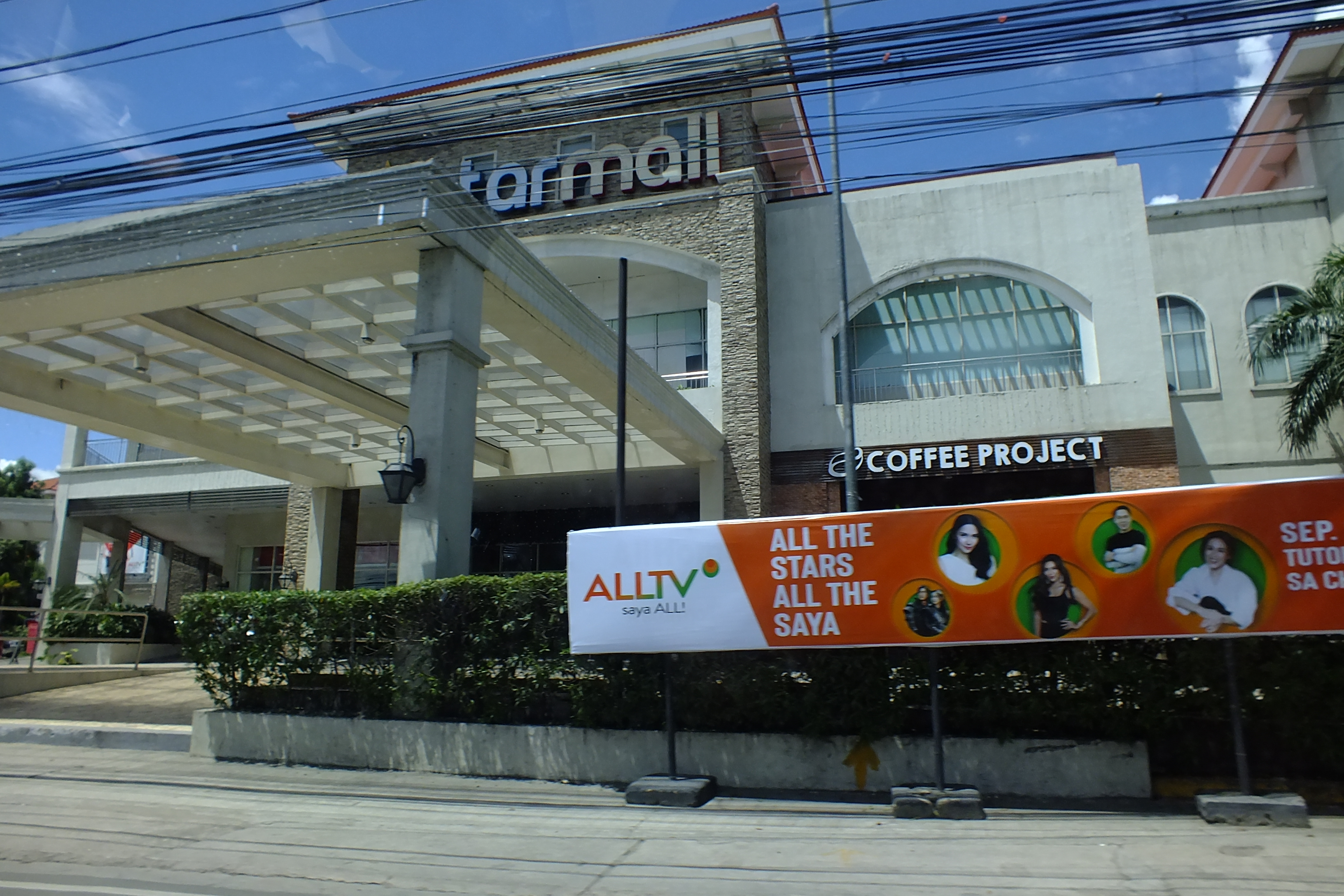
Starmall Talisay

=== Current ===
Name	Location	Notes
Starmall EDSA Shaw	Mandaluyong	Formerly Manuela 3 and Manuela EDSA.
Starmall San Jose del Monte	San Jose del Monte, Bulacan	
Starmall Talisay	Talisay, Cebu	
Starmall Annex Las Piñas	Pamplona Tres, Las Piñas	
Starplaza Agro	Putatan, Muntinlupa	

=== Former ===
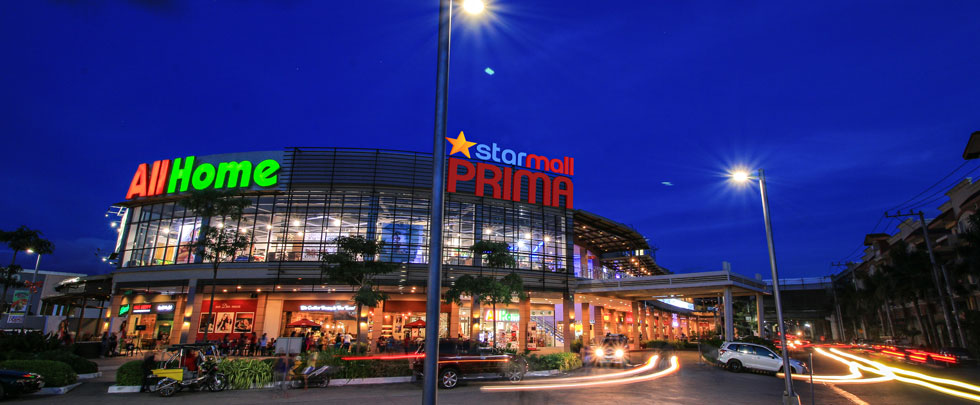
Starmall Prima Taguig (now Vista Mall Taguig)

Name	Location	Notes
Starmall Alabang	Alabang, Muntinlupa	Formerly Manuela Metropolis Alabang and Metropolis Star. Mall demolished after the January 8, 2022 fire. Now known as The Terminal, which is under Vista Malls, the modern identity of Starmalls.
Starmall Las Piñas	Pamplona Dos, Las Piñas	Became part of Vista Malls
Starmall Prima Taguig	Taguig	Became part of Vista Malls
Starmall Prima Daang Hari	Bacoor	Became part of Vista Malls, now known as SOMO - A Vista Mall
Starmall Prima Sta. Rosa	Santa Rosa, Laguna	Became part of Vista Malls
