= Camella =

Property developer in the Philippines

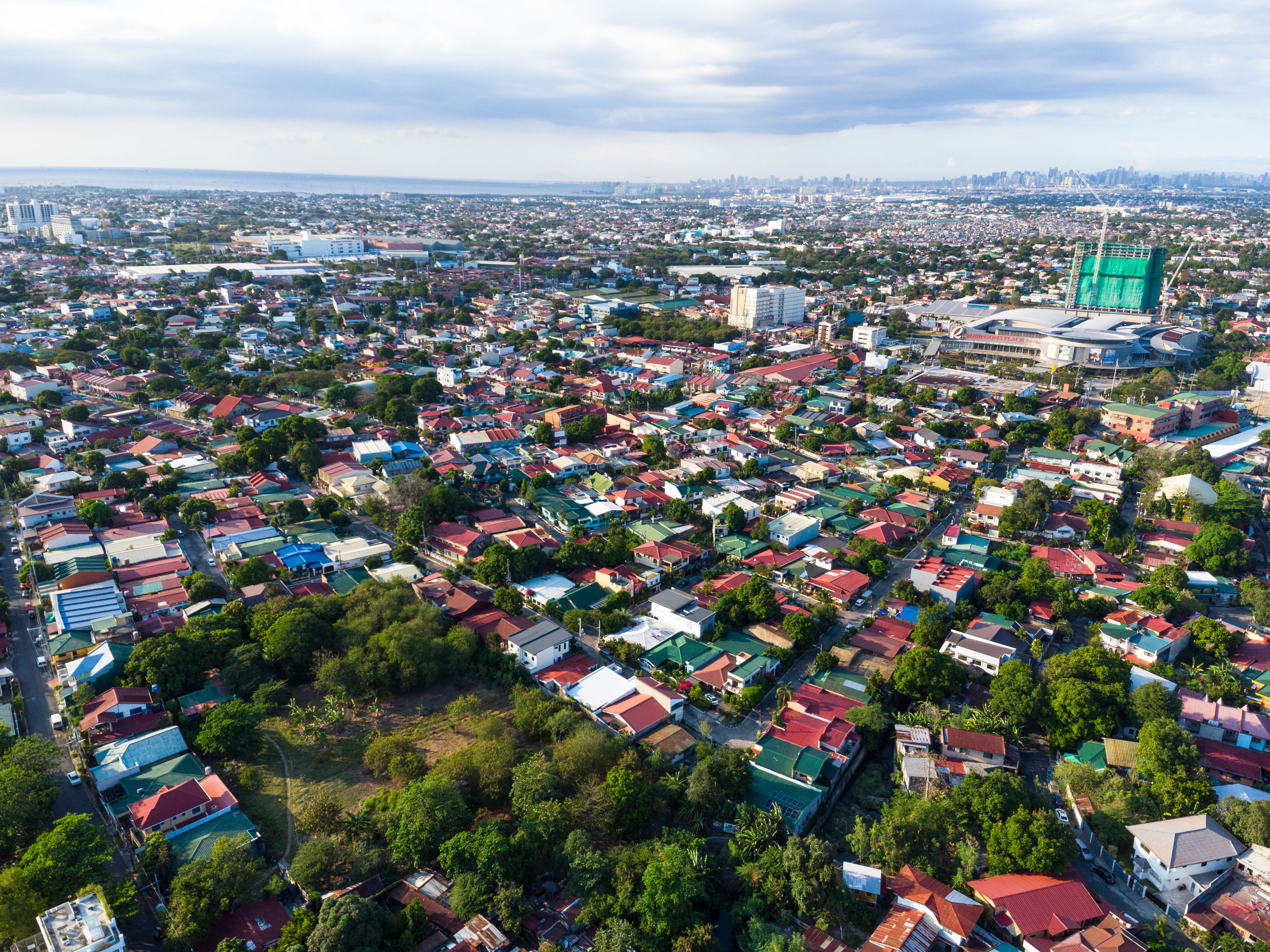
- The first Camella Homes project of Manny Villar in Las Piñas
- Formerly: Mahogany
- Type: Subsidiary
- Industry: Real estate
- Founded: August 1977; 48 years ago
- Founder: Manny Villar
- Headquarters: Worldwide Corporate Center, Mandaluyong, Metro Manila, Philippines
- Key people: Manuel B. Villar Jr. (chairman); Manuel "Paolo" A. Villar III (vice chairman, president and CEO); Cynthia Javarez (COO)
- Brands: Camella Homes; Camella Manors
- Parent: Vista Land
- Website: www.camella.com.ph

Camella Inc. is a house and lot and condominium developer in the Philippines. It is the flagship subsidiary of Vista Land, which is part of the Villar Group of Companies associated with Manny Villar.

== History ==
Camella was founded by Manuel B. Villar Jr. as Mahogany in August 1977. He took out a seven-year loan from a rural bank offering low interest rates, then kick-started building and selling at his first project, Camella Homes Phase 1 and 2 in Las Piñas, with 160 units initially. Villar later changed the company name from "Mahogany" to "Camella" for a more feminine-sounding name, which he based on his insight that women often had final say in the major financial decisions of a family. The company became the pioneer for developing house and lot packages in the country, when the usual practice at that time was to sell lots for future homeowners to build on. This initiated the mass housing projects through economies of scale, utilizing the cost advantages of developing a large-scale project to bring down housing prices. Camella has since become the country's largest home building company.

== Controversies ==
In March 2021, the homeowner associations of the Camella Cerritos Heights and Lessandra Heights residential subdivision developments in Bacoor, Cavite protested the prohibition of Internet service providers competing against sister company Planet Cable (now Streamtech) from operating in their neighborhoods.

In a letter to the National Telecommunications Commission, Cerritos Heights Homeowners Association Inc. (CHHAI) president Toteng Tanglao wrote about the unavailability of ISPs aside from Planet Cable due to right of way issues and lack of permits given to build broadband lines inside Cerritos Heights Phases 1 and 2; Cerritos Terraces; and Cerritos Hills Phases 1, 2 and 3. This was forwarded to the Philippine Competition Commission. Camella did not respond to their initial request, nor to one from Lani Mercado, the mayor of Bacoor.

A team of armed security guards blocked personnel of Globe Telecom, a subsidiary of conglomerate Ayala Corporation, from installing Internet access cables in May, 2021.

Camella responded to the petition by releasing a set of policies clarifying and formalizing the process for accepting entry of other providers. PLDT had since then sent the CHHAI initial plans to service their area.

== Awards and recognition ==
Camella was recognized by Reader's Digest as "Asia's Trusted Brand" in property development from 2012 to 2017.

In 2016, the Camella Palawan resort was named as "Best Housing Development" by the Philippines Property Awards.

In 2022, Camella was recognized as "Best Developer" at the inaugural Carousell Property Awards.

In 2023, Camella was named "Developer of the Year" for Luzon, Visayas, and Mindanao at the Lamudi The Outlook Philippine Real Estate Awards. In the same year, Camella Gran Europa received the award for "Best Premium House" in the Visayas and Mindanao regions.

In 2024, Camella in Provence was awarded "Best Premium House of the Year" in Luzon at the Lamudi The Outlook Philippine Real Estate Awards.
