= Muntinlupa–Cavite Expressway =

Road in the Philippines

Coordinates: 14°22′37″N 121°1′37″E

Muntinlupa–Cavite Expressway

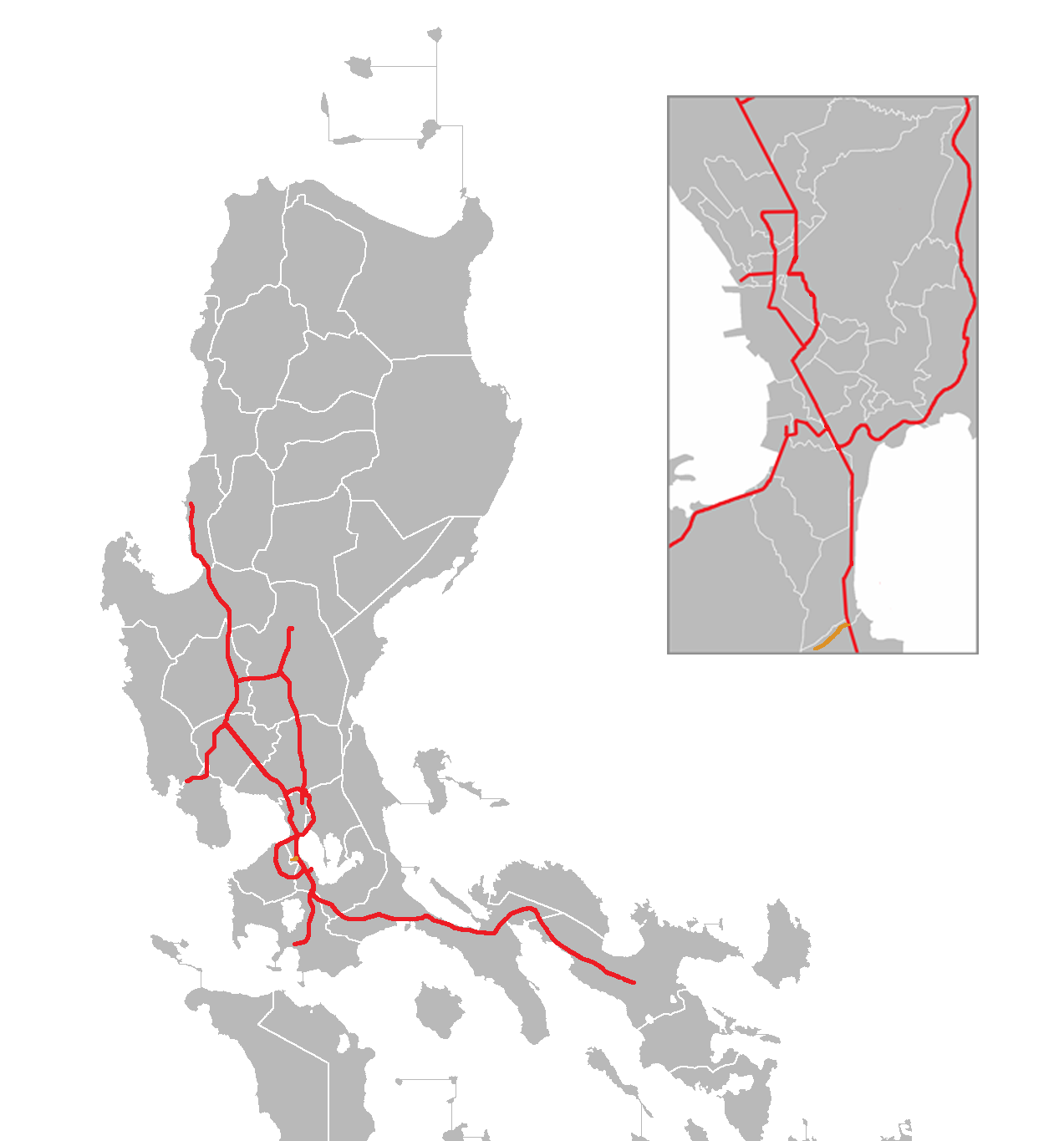
- Map of expressways in Luzon, with the Muntinlupa–Cavite Expressway in orange

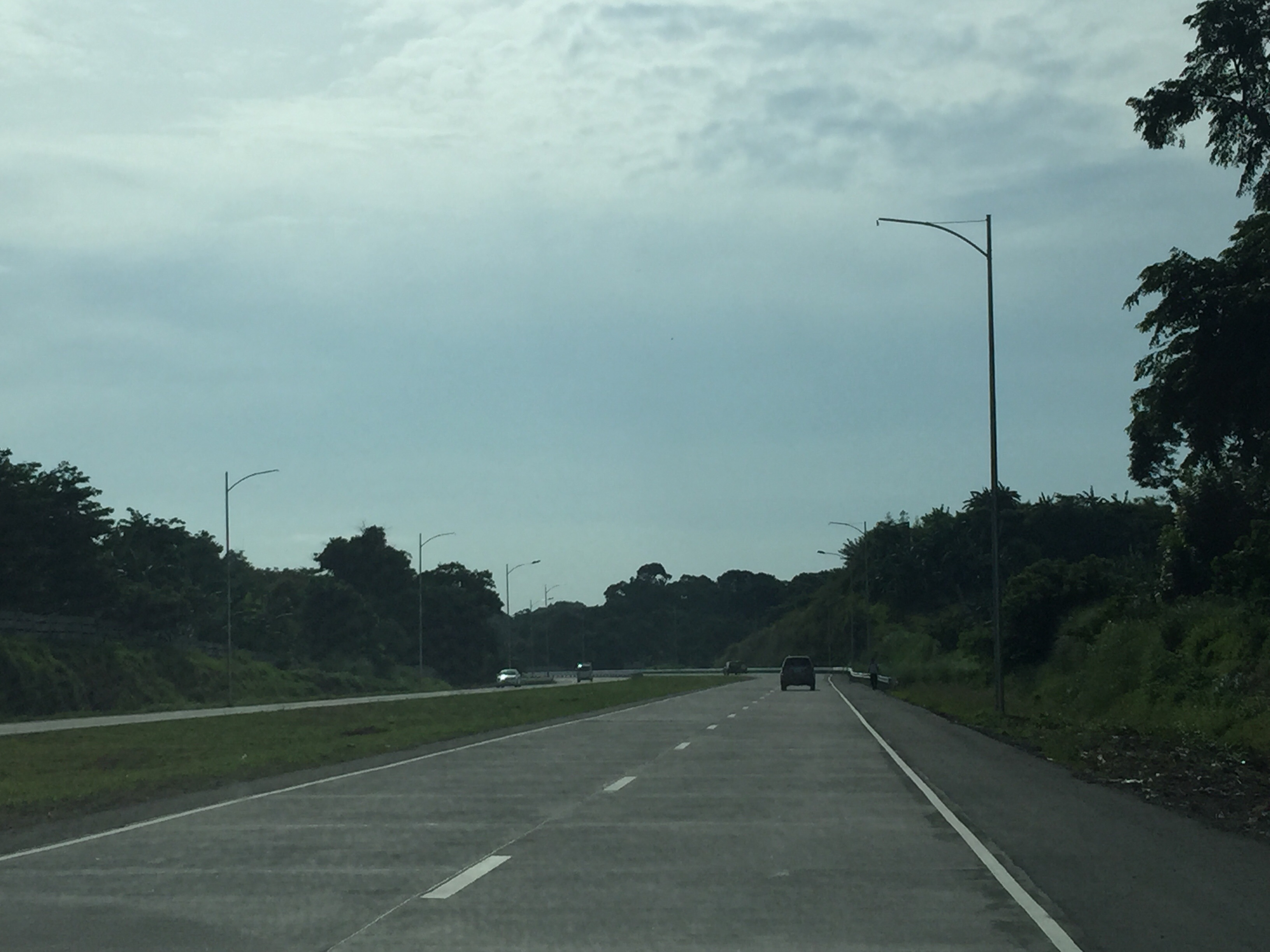
- Muntinlupa–Cavite Expressway looking east towards the Susana Heights Interchange

Route information
- Auxiliary route of E2
- Maintained by Prime Asset Ventures Inc.
- Length: 4 km (2.5 mi)
- Existed: 2015–present
- Component highways: E2
- Restrictions: No motorcycles below 400cc

Major junctions
- East end: AH26 (South Luzon Expressway) in Muntinlupa
- West end: Villar Gyratory in Muntinlupa

Location
- Country: Philippines
- Major cities: Muntinlupa

Highway system
- Roads in the Philippines; Highways; Expressways; List

The Muntinlupa–Cavite Expressway (MCX), (Note: The Muntinlupa–Cavite Expressway is also known by its former name as the Daang Hari–SLEX Link Road. Because of a sponsorship deal with FWD Life Philippines, the expressway is also known as the FWD-Muntinlupa-Cavite Expressway (FWD-MCX).) signed as E2 of the Philippine expressway network, is a 4-kilometer-long (2.5 mi) controlled-access toll expressway linking the southern province of Cavite to Muntinlupa in the Philippines.

Opened to traffic on July 24, 2015, it is currently the shortest expressway in the Philippines. It connects the South Luzon Expressway (SLEX) to Daang Hari and Daang Reyna near Las Piñas and Bacoor.

== Route description ==
Muntinlupa–Cavite Expressway acts as a connector between Daang Hari and South Luzon Expressway. The expressway passes near the vicinity of the New Bilibid Prison and Southville 2A, one of the relocation areas of informal settlers who once lived beside the Philippine National Railways line.

The expressway starts with a T-interchange with South Luzon Expressway near Susana Heights. It follows a slight curving route paralleling Magdaong River, which acts as a boundary between barangays Poblacion and Tunasan. It soon passes near the New Bilibid Prison, where several access roads are rerouted with the construction of the expressway. The expressway ends at the Villar Gyratory, a roundabout intersection with Daang Hari, Daang Reyna, and Biazon Road.

== History ==
Alabang-Sto. Tomas Development Inc. (ASDI), a joint venture between the Philippine National Construction Corporation (PNCC) and the National Development Company (NDC), was incorporated in 2005 to undertake what was initially known as the Daang Hari–SLEX Connector Road Project. On December 15, 2009, ASDI and PNCC signed a Memorandum of Agreement, with ASDI as the Main Turnkey Contractor. The project was 25% complete when the Department of Public Works and Highways (DPWH) took over for public bidding. Ayala Corporation won the bid for ₱900 million, reimbursing ASDI ₱353 million.

Known in the planning stages as the Daang Hari–SLEX Link Road, the expressway was approved by the National Economic and Development Authority board on July 18, 2011, making it the first toll road awarded under the Public-Private Partnership program of the Benigno Aquino III administration. The Notice of Award was issued on December 22, 2011, and Ayala Corporation signed a 30-year concession agreement on April 12, 2012. Construction began on October 1, 2012, and concluded on June 30, 2015. On July 24, 2015, at 2:00 p.m. PHT, the expressway was opened to traffic following its inauguration by President Benigno Aquino III.

The expressway was operated by MCX Tollway Inc., a subsidiary of Ayala Corporation's AC Infrastructure Holdings Corporation (AC Infra). On December 7, 2019, FWD Life Philippines and AC Infra announced their Expressway Sponsorship Program, renaming the expressway as FWD-Muntinlupa-Cavite Expressway (FWD-MCX) as part of FWD's marketing initiative.

On July 19, 2023, the DPWH gave its consent for the transfer of ownership of the expressway from Ayala Corporation to the Villar Group. Subsequently, on August 9, 2023, the Villar Group, through Prime Asset Ventures Inc., completed the acquisition worth ₱3.8 billion.

== Toll ==
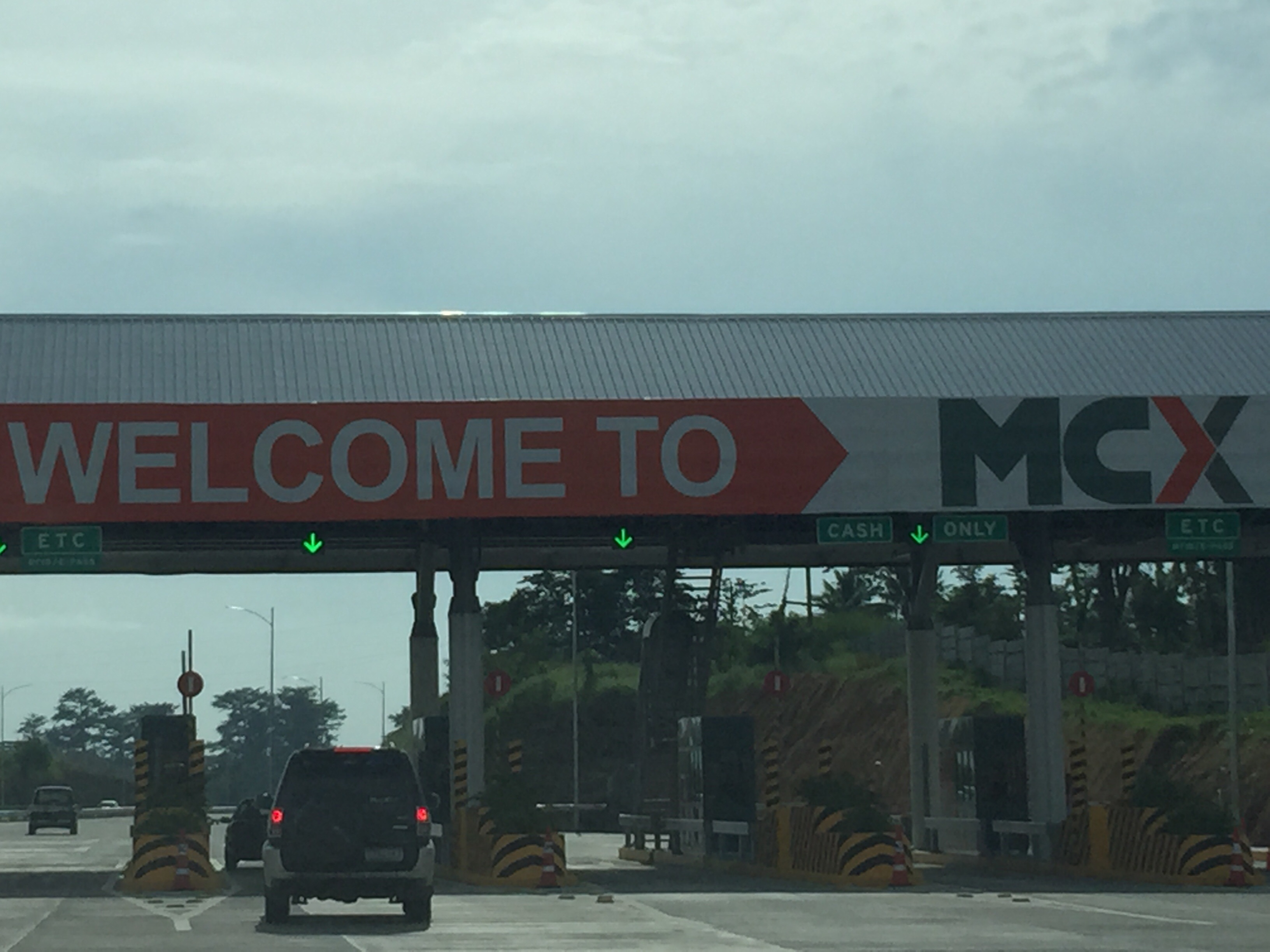
MCX Toll Plaza

Tolls are assessed in each direction at the toll barrier based on class. On July 21, 2015, Ayala Corporation and San Miguel Corporation, the operators of Muntinlupa–Cavite and South Luzon Expressways, respectively, signed an interoperability agreement.

As a result of the agreement, motorists using the Muntinlupa–Cavite Expressway would be required to pay a toll fee, which depends on the vehicle class, in addition to the toll fee between their entry or exit point at SLEX, Skyway, or since 2022, the STAR Tollway and Susana Heights Exit. Eastbound vehicles receive tickets at the MCX Toll Plaza when paying in cash, and they pay their toll fees upon exit from SLEX or STAR Tollway or at the Skyway Main Toll Plaza in Muntinlupa, as part of San Miguel Corporation's Seamless Southern Tollways. Westbound vehicles pay their toll fees at the MCX Toll Plaza. Under the law, all toll rates include a 12% value-added tax.

The expressway implements an electronic toll collection (ETC) system using the RFID-based Autosweep. The ETC system is shared with SMC Infrastructure tollways such as SLEX, Skyway, STAR Tollway, NAIAX, and TPLEX.

Toll rates as of September 2025:

Class	Toll
Class 1 (Cars, Motorcycles, SUVs, Jeepneys)	₱23.00
Class 2 (Buses, Light Trucks)	₱47.00
Class 3 (Heavy Trucks)	₱70.00

== Services ==
=== Service areas ===
The expressway currently has two service areas, one in each direction, between the western terminus at Daang Hari and the MCX Toll Plaza. Each service station hosts a gas station, a convenience store, restrooms, car repair, and lubrication services. The Unioil station also hosts restaurants.

Name	Services	Notes
Unioil MCX	7-Eleven, Dunkin' Donuts, Potato Corner, R&B Tea, Unioil	Westbound only. Formerly Caltex (2019–2023).
Shell MCX Kings Road	Shell, Shell Select	Eastbound only.

== Exits ==
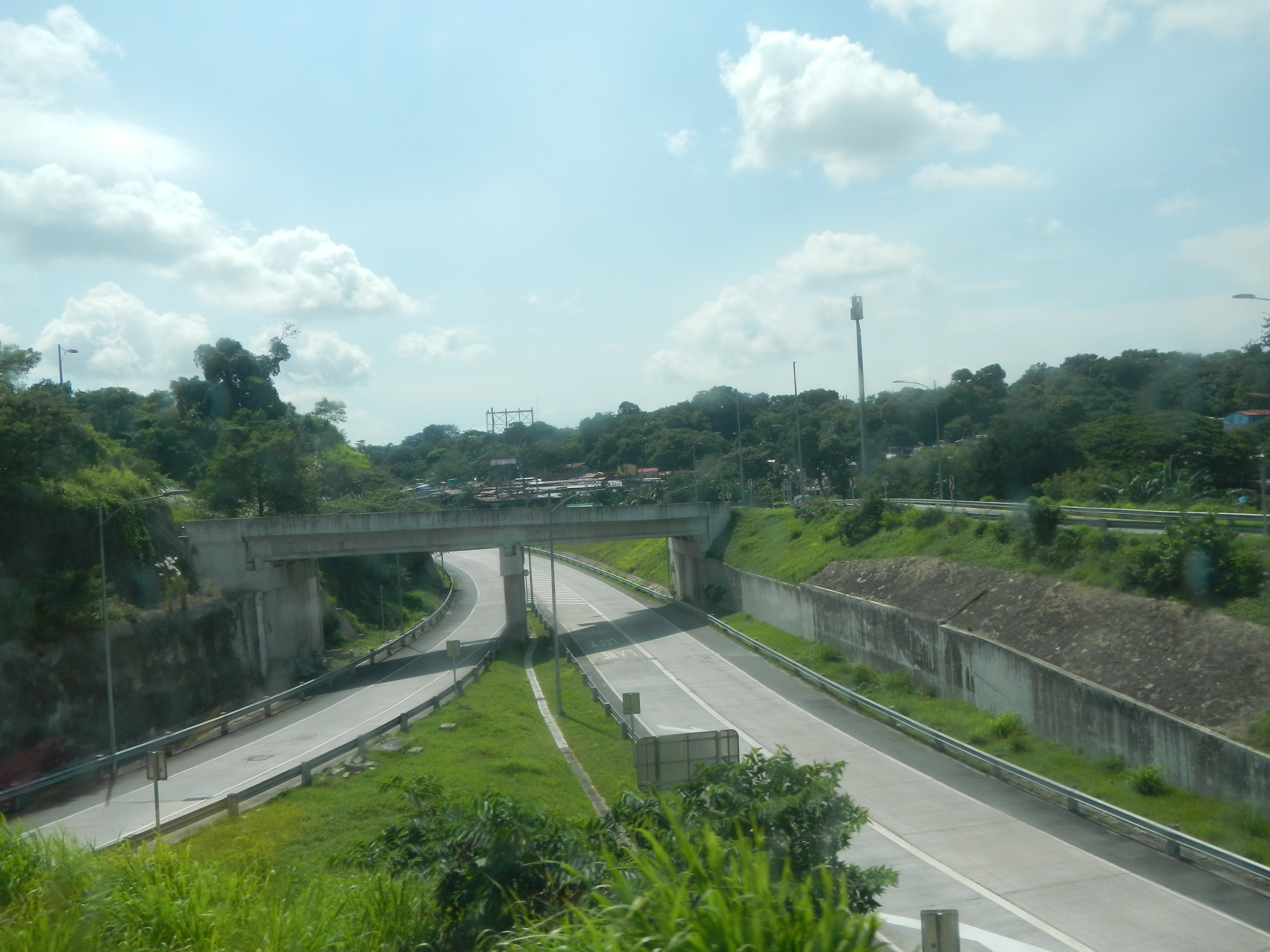
View of MCX westward from its interchange with South Luzon Expressway at MCX/Susana Heights Exit

The entire route is located in Muntinlupa. Kilometer count is numbered by kilometer posts, designating Rizal Park in Manila as kilometer zero as it branches off from the South Luzon Expressway.

km	mi	Destinations	Notes
26.1	16.2	AH26 (SLEX) – Makati, Manila, Susana Heights, Calamba	Hybrid trumpet and directional T interchange; eastern terminus
28.5	17.7	MCX toll plaza	
28.6	17.8	Unioil MCX service station (westbound access only)	
28.9	18.0	Shell MCX Kings Road service station (eastbound access only)	
28.9	18.0	Daang Hari Road / Daang Reyna / Biazon Road – Las Piñas, Bacoor, Villar City, San Pedro, Southville 3	Villar Gyratory (roundabout); western terminus
1.000 mi = 1.609 km; 1.000 km = 0.621 mi: Incomplete access; Tolled
