= Daang Hari =

Road in the Philippines

Coordinates: 14°23′9″N 120°58′40″E

- Las Piñas–Muntinlupa–Laguna–Cavite Link Road
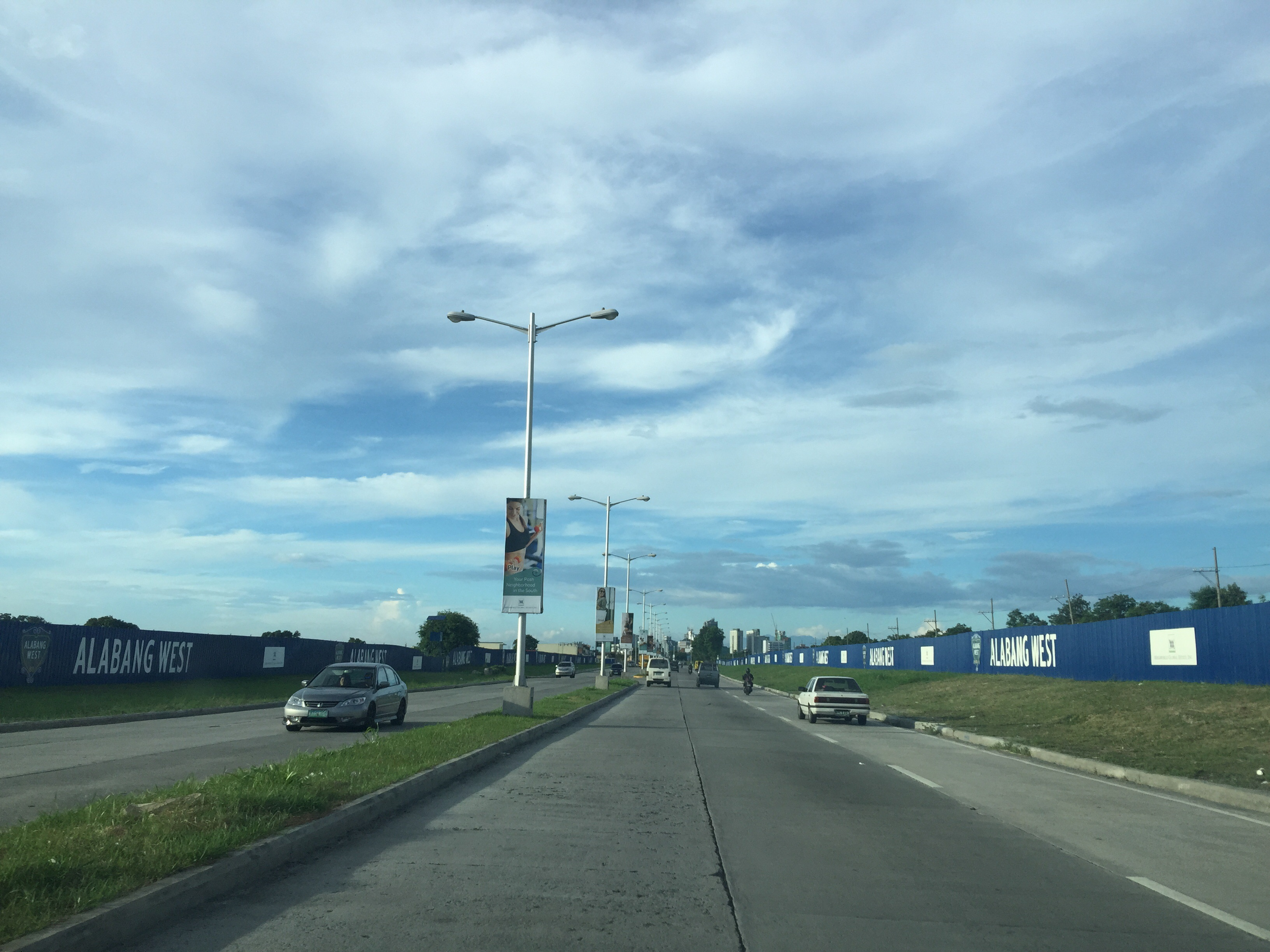
- Daang Hari, facing north towards Madrigal Business Park

Route information
- Length: 15.1 km (9.4 mi)
- Existed: 2003–present

Mainline
- North end: Commerce Avenue and Investment Drive on Las Piñas–Muntinlupa boundary
- Major intersections: E2 (Muntinlupa–Cavite Expressway)
- South end: N419 (Aguinaldo Highway) in Imus

Extension
- East end: N419 (Aguinaldo Highway) in Imus
- West end: Open Canal Road in General Trias

Location
- Country: Philippines
- Major cities: Bacoor, Dasmariñas, General Trias, Imus, Las Piñas, and Muntinlupa

Highway system
- Roads in the Philippines; Highways; Expressways; List

Daang Hari (lit. 'Road [of the] King'), also known as the Las Piñas–Muntinlupa–Laguna–Cavite Link Road (LPMLC Link Road), is a connector road that links southern Metro Manila to the province of Cavite in the Philippines. It begins as a north–south road from Commerce Avenue, just south of the Alabang–Zapote Road, running for 5.9 kilometers (3.7 mi) on the boundary of Las Piñas and Muntinlupa. It then runs east–west for about 9.2 kilometers (5.7 mi) from its junction with Daang Reyna, winding through Bacoor, Imus, Dasmariñas, and General Trias.

== Route description ==
Most of Daang Hari Road is a four-lane median-divided highway.

A spur road named Daang Reyna leads to some gated communities in Dasmariñas, Cavite, Muntinlupa, and San Pedro, Laguna via Magsaysay Road. The spur is mostly a two-lane divided road.

=== Las Piñas to Muntinlupa ===
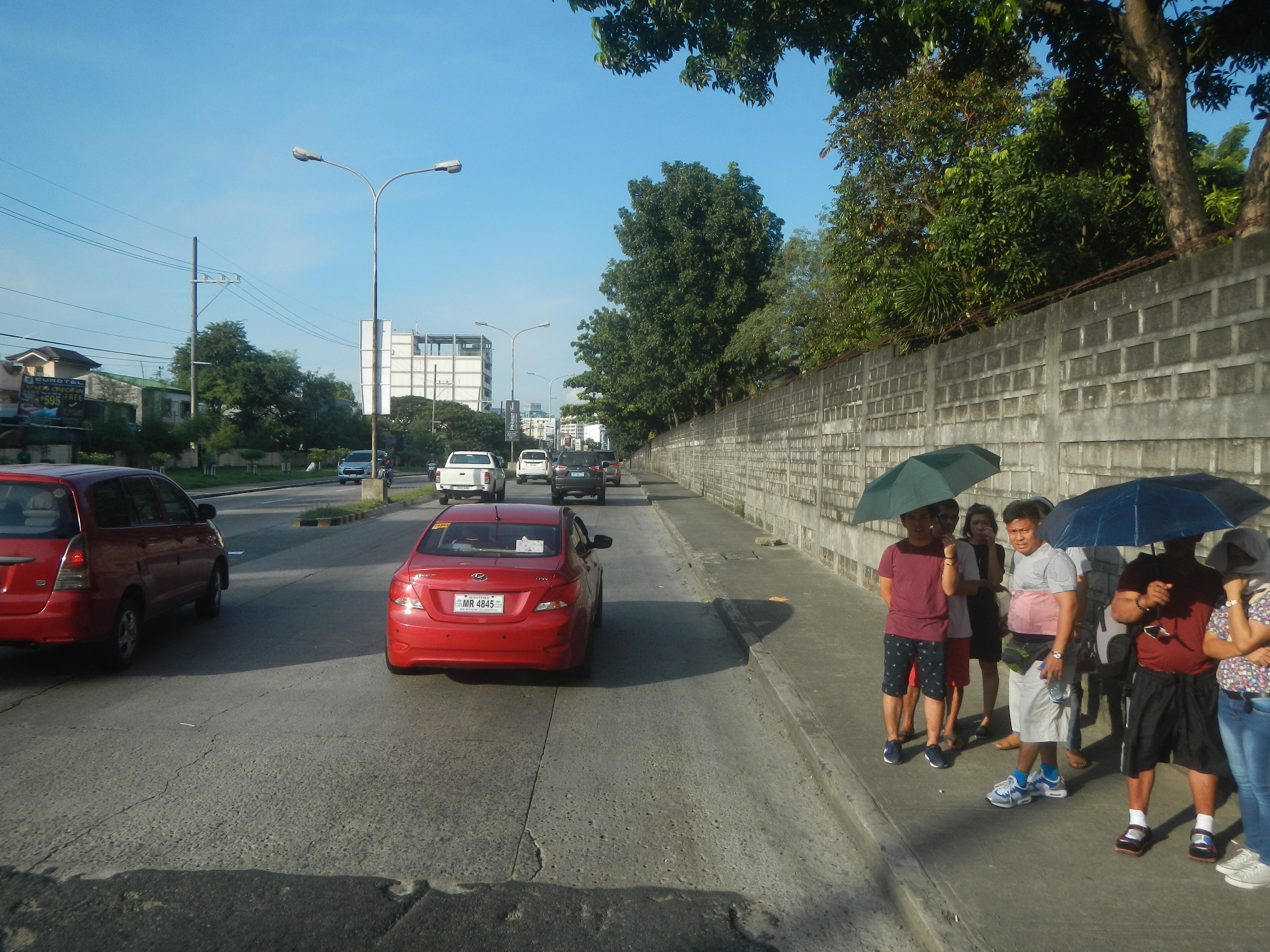
Daang Hari in Las Pinas

Daang Hari's northern terminus is at the junction with Commerce Avenue in Madrigal Business Park near Alabang Town Center, where it continues from the short Investment Drive from Alabang–Zapote Road. The road forms the border between Barangay Ayala Alabang and Poblacion of Muntinlupa to the east and Barangay Almanza Dos of Las Piñas to the west. The road passes the following villages from north to south: T.S. Cruz Subdivision, Ayala Alabang, Ayala Southvale, Versailles, Katarungan Village, and Portofino Heights before coming to Villar Gyratory, a roundabout with Daang Reyna, Muntinlupa–Cavite Expressway (MCX), and Biazon Road near Evia Lifestyle Center.

=== Muntinlupa to Imus ===
From the Villar Gyratory, the road curves sharply to the west and traverses the Molino villages of Bacoor, including, from east to west, Verdana Homes, Malipay and Springville South. It then veers north as it intersects SoMo Road, near the namesake mall, before intersecting with Molino-Paliparan Road where The Molino Flyover goes through Daang Hari.

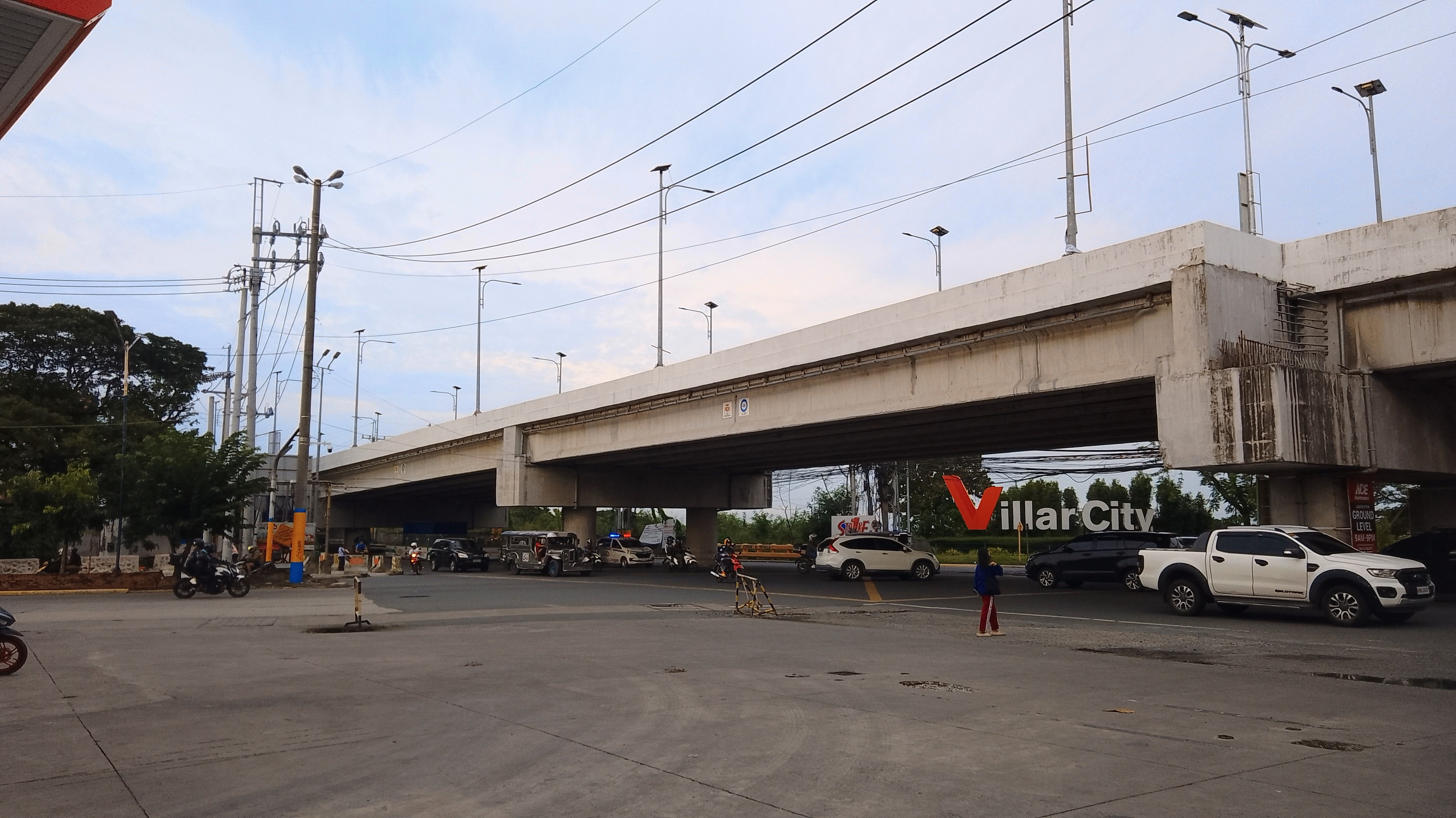
The Molino Flyover in 2024 which was finished on Dec 12, 2023

A few hundred meters west of Molino–Paliparan Road, Daang Hari enters Imus, passing through Barangay Pasong Buaya before terminating at the intersection with Aguinaldo Highway in Anabu near the boundary with Salitran, Dasmariñas where The District mall is located. A flyover is under construction to divert through traffic on the existing intersection with Aguinaldo Highway. In 2019, the flyover was opened to the public.

=== Imus to General Trias ===
Daang Hari includes an extension to General Trias named Open Canal Road, also named Daang Hari Extension. The original road is an access road for irrigation canals maintained by the National Irrigation Administration. The road passes by Lancaster New City and other nearby subdivisions and some paddy fields before ending at Arnaldo Highway in barangay Pasong Camachile. Open Canal Road is a minor local road up to Governor Ferrer Drive. The road is currently under road widening.

== History ==
The road was inaugurated on December 13, 2003, as the Las Piñas–Muntinlupa–Laguna–Cavite (LPMLC) Link Road that runs from Ayala Alabang to Molino Road. It was built as part of then-Senator Manny Villar's initiative to decongest traffic in southern Metro Manila.

Works by the Department of Public Works and Highways (DPWH) on the road was completed in 2005 and is composed of two roads, the Las Piñas–Muntinlupa–San Pedro Road (which includes the present Daang Reyna) within Metro Manila and the original Daang Hari through Bacoor and Imus.

== Urban legend ==
Daang Hari is claimed by paranormal believers to be haunted by specters of the murder victims whose bodies were dumped in the area during the time it was still sparsely populated and unlit.

== Intersections ==
Daang Hari has no official kilometer count as it is not under the jurisdiction of the Department of Public Works and Highways (DPWH).

Region	Province	City/Municipality	km	mi	Destinations	Notes
Metro Manila	Muntinlupa–Las Piñas boundary				Commerce Avenue, Investment Drive	Northern terminus; continues north as Investment Drive
Metro Manila	Muntinlupa–Las Piñas boundary				E2 (Muntinlupa–Cavite Expressway) / Daang Reyna	Roundabout
Calabarzon	Cavite	Bacoor			Molino–Paliparan Road (Bacoor–Dasmariñas National Highway)	Molino Flyover
Calabarzon	Cavite	Imus			N419 (Aguinaldo Highway)	Daang Hari Flyover
Calabarzon	Cavite	Imus			Cavite–Laguna Expressway	Link to future interchange
Calabarzon	Cavite	General Trias			Arnaldo Highway	Western terminus; continues into General Trias as the Open Canal Road
1.000 mi = 1.609 km; 1.000 km = 0.621 mi: Unopened

== Spur ==
=== Daang Reyna ===
Daang Reyna Road Vista Avenue
- Location: Las Piñas
- Length: 2 km (1.2 mi)

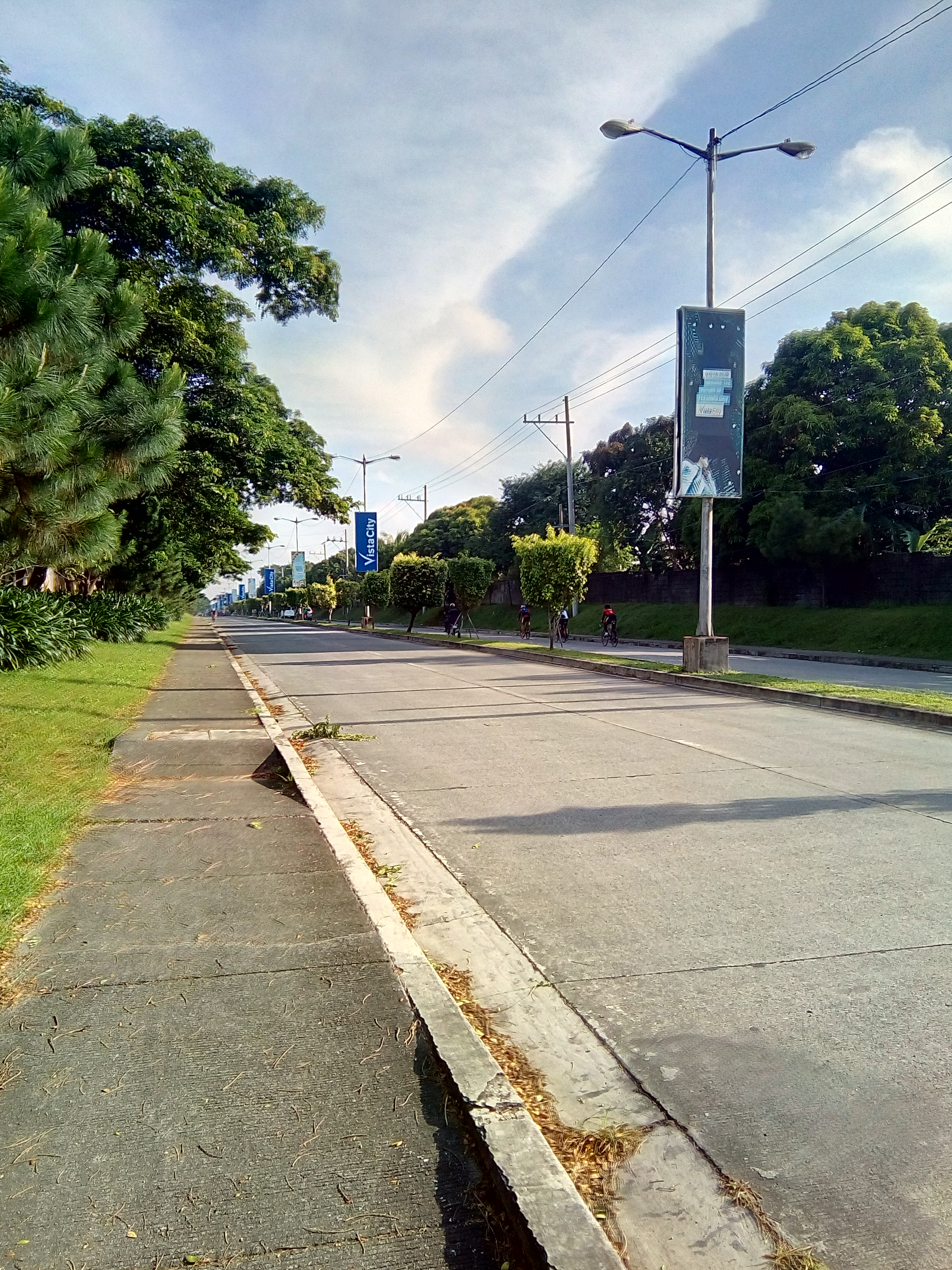
Daang Reyna near Portofino South, one of several gated communities owned by Crown Asia by Vista Land

Daang Reyna (lit. 'Road [of the] Queen'), or Vista Avenue, is a 2-kilometer (1.2 mi) spur of Daang Hari, starting from the Daang Hari–MCX Interchange near Evia Lifestyle Center. It spurs off Daang Hari at the Villar Gyratory roundabout and continues south towards another roundabout with Victoria Avenue, which leads to Muntinlupa and ends in Magsaysay Road in San Pedro, Laguna. The road lies near the Muntinlupa–Las Piñas boundary and passes near gated communities like Portofino South and Amore at Portofino, owned by Vista Land.

==== Intersections ====
The entire route is located in Las Piñas.

km	mi	Destinations	Notes
		Daang Hari, E2 (Muntinlupa–Cavite Expressway)	Roundabout; northern terminus
		Victoria Avenue	Roundabout; southern terminus
1.000 mi = 1.609 km; 1.000 km = 0.621 mi
