= Vista Malls =

Shopping mall in the Philippines

- Product type: Shopping mall chain
- Current owner: Vista Land
- Country: Philippines
- Introduced: 2012
- Markets: Philippines
- Website: www.vistamalls.com.ph

Vista Malls is a shopping mall chain of property developer Vista Land founded and chaired by Filipino billionaire and former politician Manny Villar. It is one of the growing major shopping mall retailers in the Philippines, along with Ayala Malls, Megaworld Lifestyle Malls, SM Supermalls and Robinsons Malls.

== Shopping malls ==
Name	Opening date	GLA (m^{2})	GFA (m^{2})	Location	Remarks
Evia Lifestyle Center	2012		120,000 sq.m	Las Piñas, Metro Manila	First IMAX with Laser theater in Southeast Asia opened on November 19, 2018, first Philippine IMAX cinema not operated by SM Cinema, and second IMAX cinema in Las Piñas after SM Southmall
Vista Mall Lakefront				Sucat, Muntinlupa, Metro Manila	Formerly Lakefront Boardwalk
Vista Mall Pampanga				San Fernando, Pampanga	
Vista Mall Antipolo				Antipolo, Rizal	Formerly Village Center Antipolo
Vista Mall Taguig	2014			Taguig, Metro Manila	Formerly Starmall Prima Taguig, the first under this brand
The Village Center CDO	March 14, 2015 (grand opening)			Cagayan de Oro	First Vista Mall outside Luzon (community Vista Mall only)
Vista Mall Bataan	April 28, 2016			Balanga, Bataan	Its first tenant that opened to the public is AllHome. Other parts of the mall were under construction when AllHome was opened in April 2016.
Vista Mall Sta. Rosa	April 29, 2016			Santa Rosa, Laguna	Formerly Starmall Prima Sta. Rosa. Its first tenant, a detached McDonald's branch, opened in December 2014. The main mall opened in 2016 as Vista Mall.
Vista Mall Las Piñas				Las Piñas, Metro Manila	Formerly Starmall Las Piñas and Manuela 2 Las Piñas
SOMO - A Vista Mall				Bacoor, Cavite	Formerly Starmall Prima Daang Hari & Vista Mall Daang Hari
Vista Mall Kawit				Kawit, Cavite	Phase 1 complete
Floriad Lifestyle				Las Piñas, Metro Manila	Formerly Vista Mall Global South Phase 1 complete
Vista Mall Iloilo	May 17, 2018 (Phase 1)		28,000 sq.m	Oton, Iloilo	first Vista Mall outside Luzon (full-scale mall) - Phase 1 complete; Phase 2 under construction
Vista Mall Naga	June 16, 2018 (Phase 1)		27,000 sq.m	Naga City	Phase 1 complete; Phase 2 under construction
Vista Mall CDO	July 31, 2018		15,000 sq.m	Limketkai Center, Cagayan de Oro	
Vista Mall General Trias	October 18, 2018 (Phase 1)			General Trias	Phase 1 with Vista Cinemas Complete; Phase 2 under construction
Vista Mall Tanza	November 17, 2018			Tanza-Trece Road, Brgy. Punta 2, Tanza, Cavite	1st floor complete; some parts of 2nd floor under construction
Vista Mall Davao	June 11, 2022 (Soft Opening)		TBA	Davao City	first full-service Vista Mall in Mindanao
Vista Mall Dasmariñas	July 31, 2019			Dasmariñas, Cavite	
Vista Mall Malolos	August 8, 2019	50,000 sq.m	36,000 sq.m	Malolos, Bulacan	1st Vista Mall in Bulacan
NOMO - A Vista Lifestyle Center	October 29, 2019			Bacoor, Cavite	Formerly Vista Mall North Molino
Vista Mall Silang	December 6, 2019			Silang, Cavite	Phase 1 consists of All Home
Vista Mall Butuan	February 27, 2020		20,000 sq.m	Butuan	
Vista Mall Sta. Maria	December 9, 2020		TBA	Santa Maria, Bulacan	Phase 2 under construction
Vista Mall Imus	February 5, 2021		TBA	Imus, Cavite	
The Terminal	November 22, 2024		TBA	Muntinlupa, Metro Manila	Built on the former site of Starmall Alabang

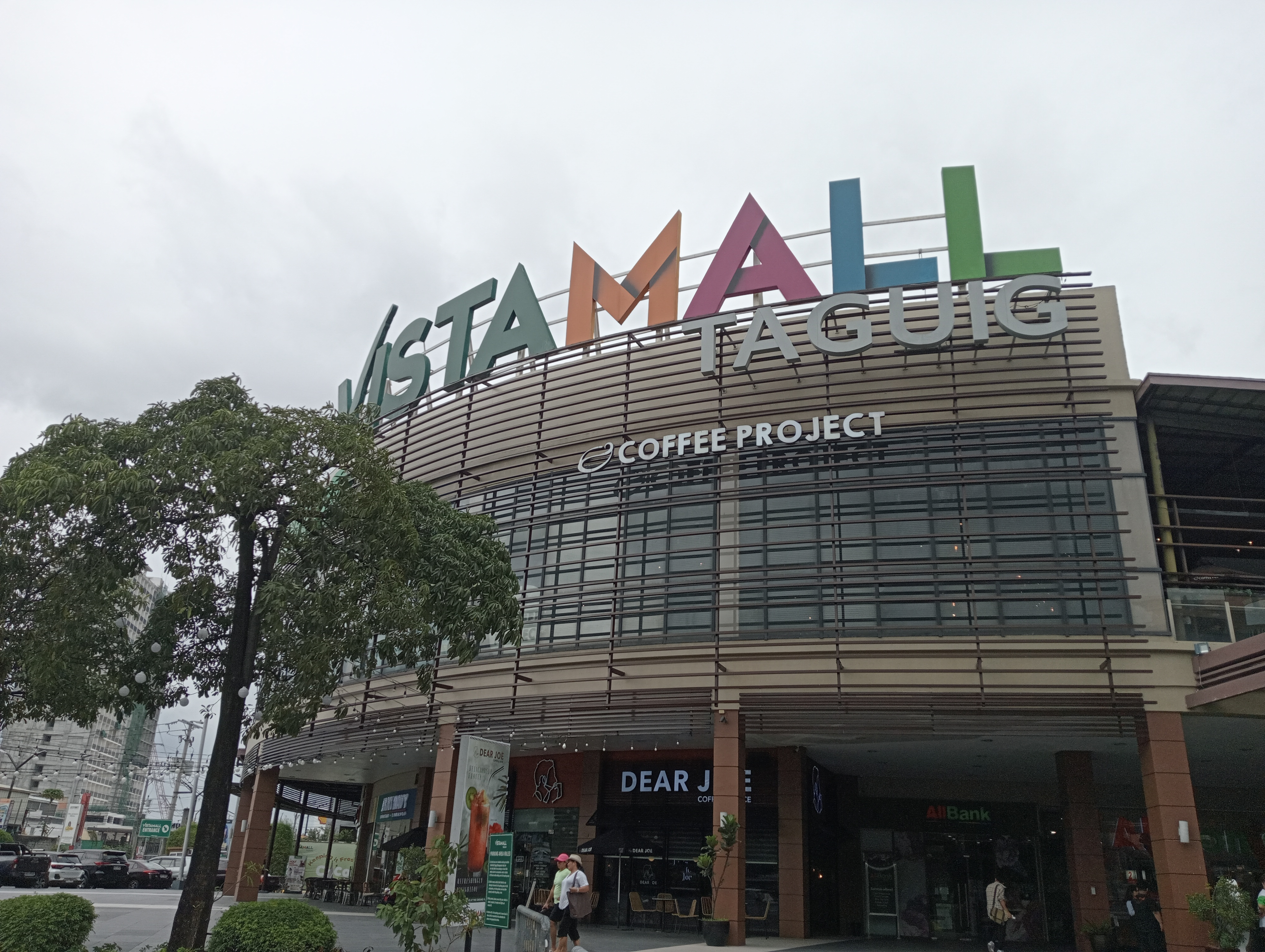
Vista Mall Taguig

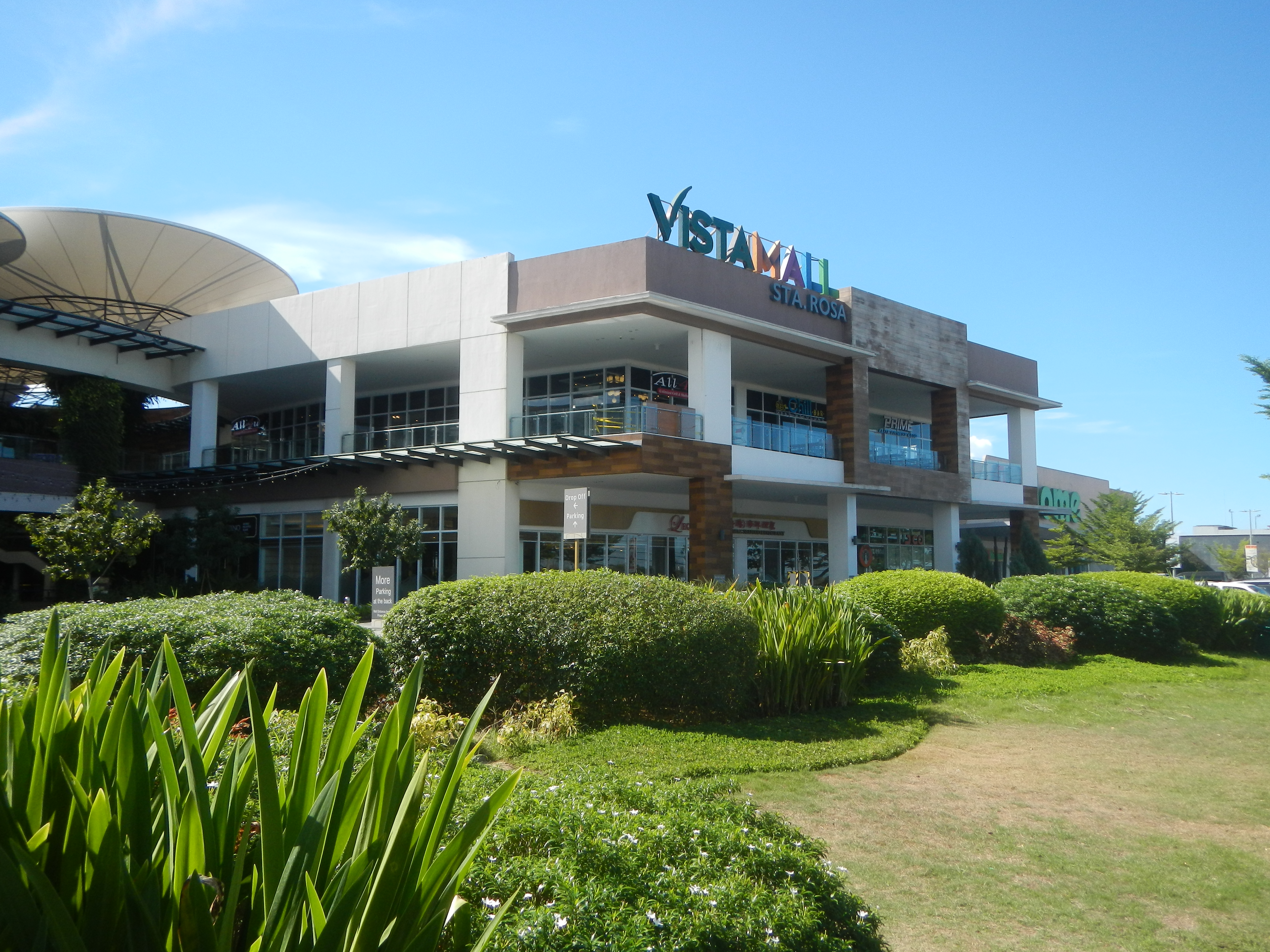
Vista Mall Sta. Rosa

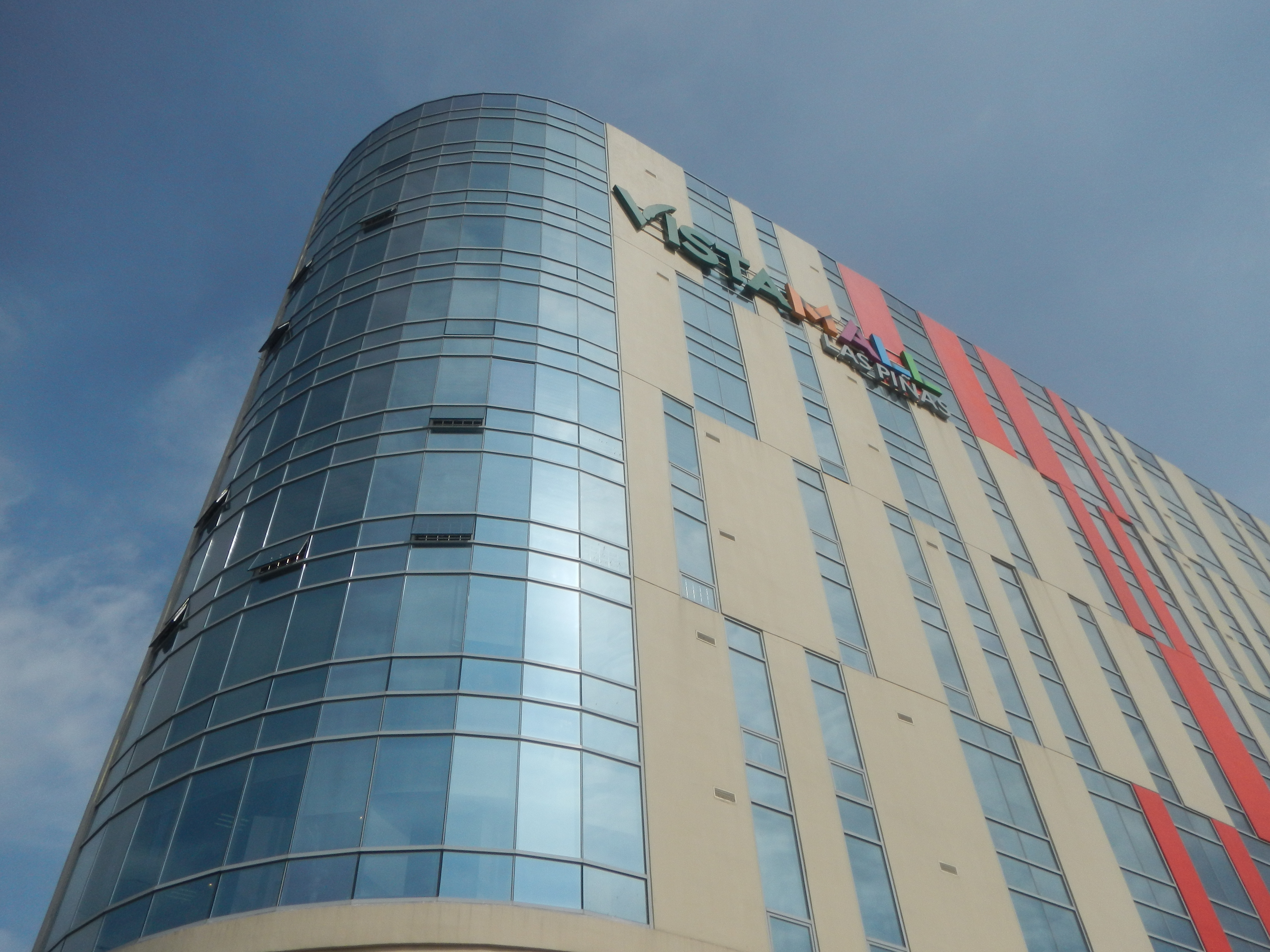
Vista Mall Las Piñas

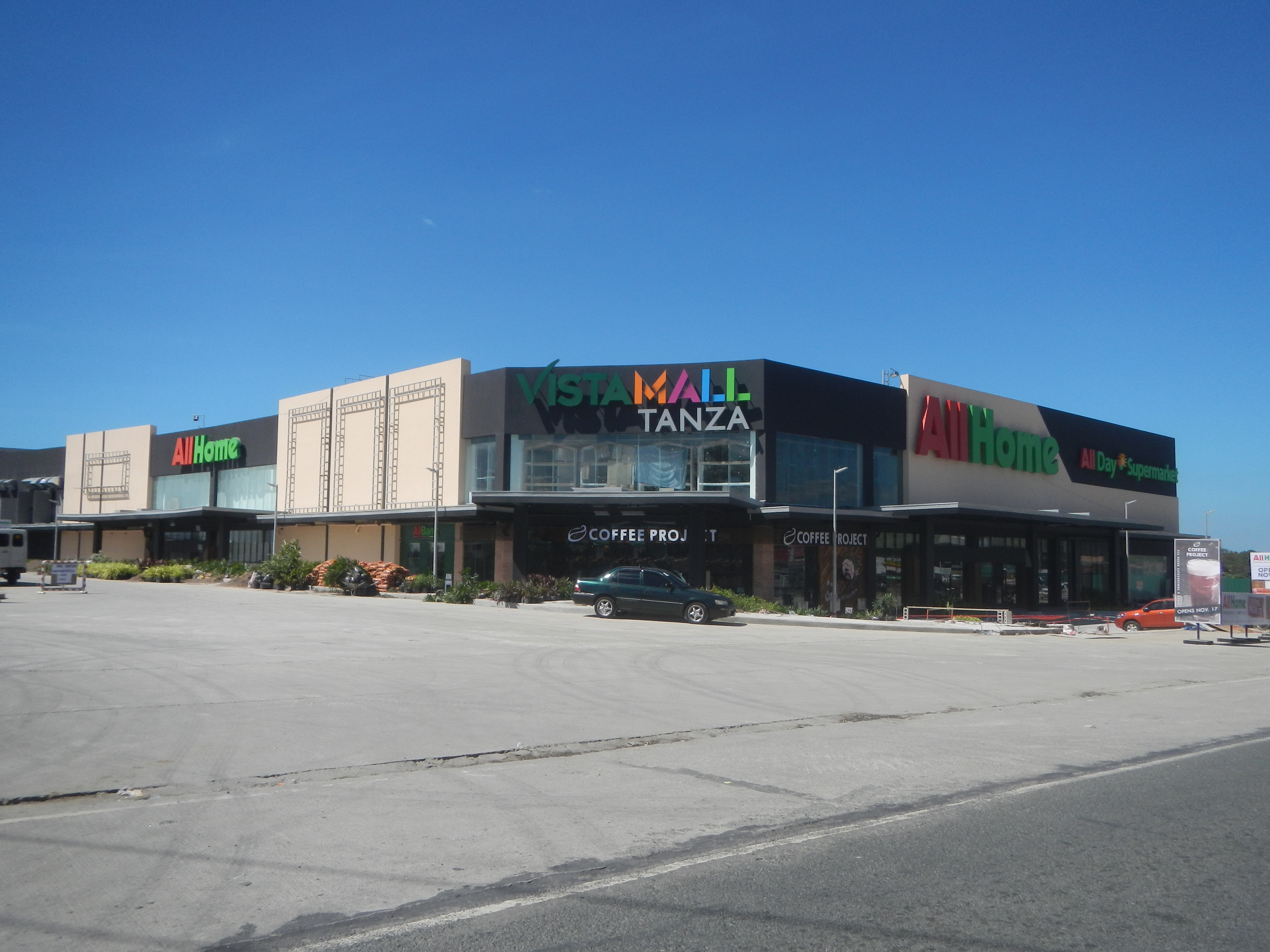
Vista Mall Tanza

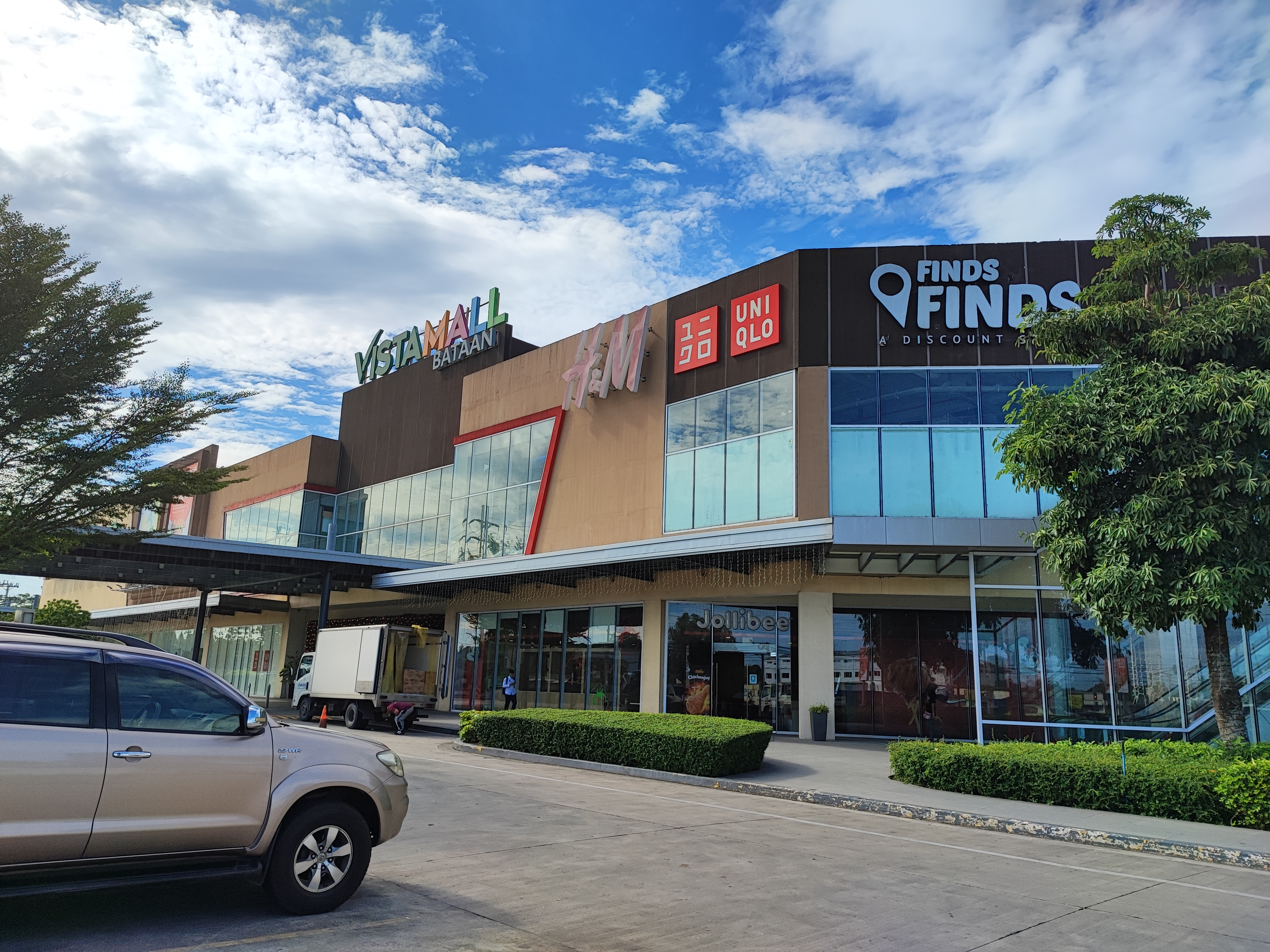
Vista Mall Bataan

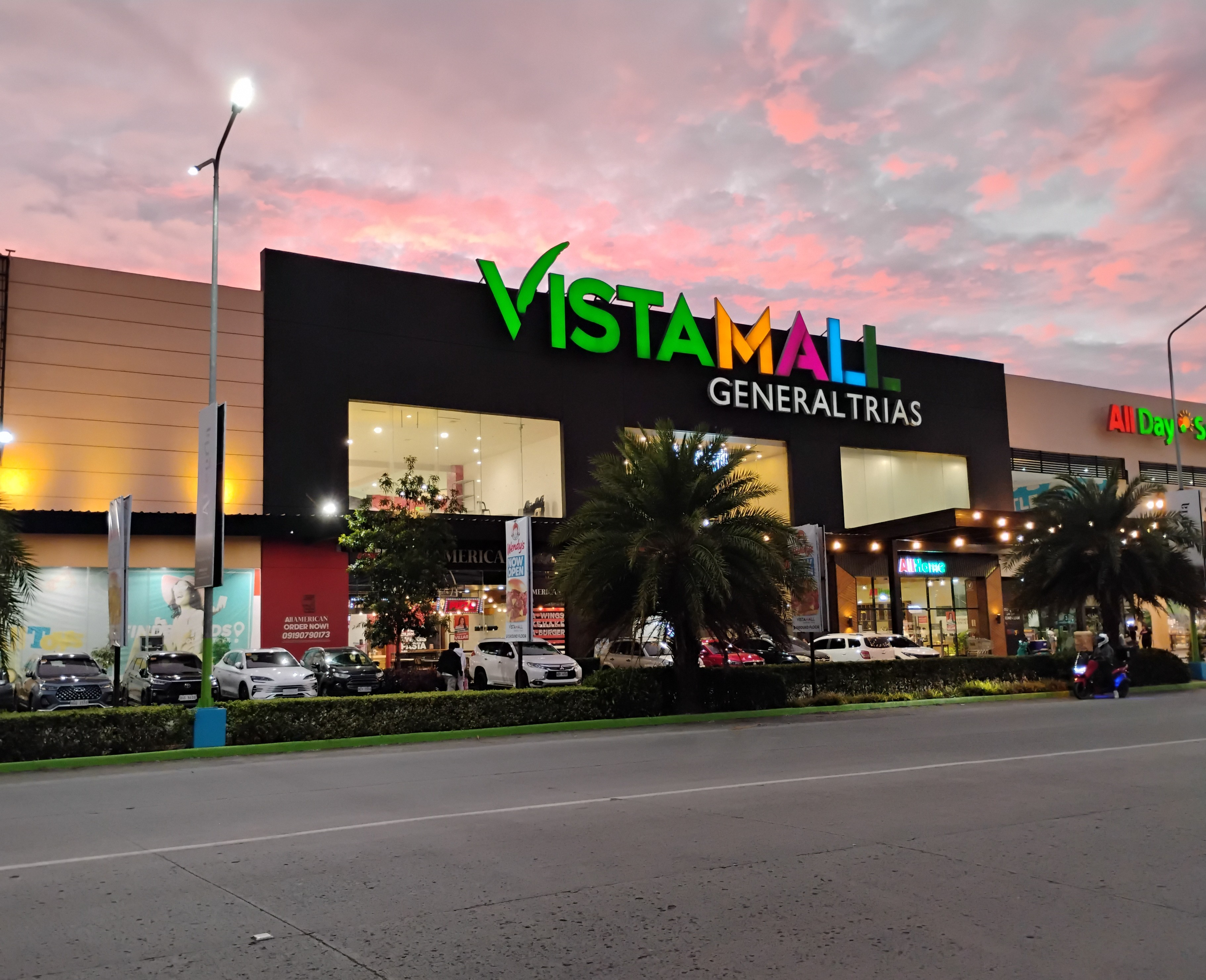
Vista Mall General Trias

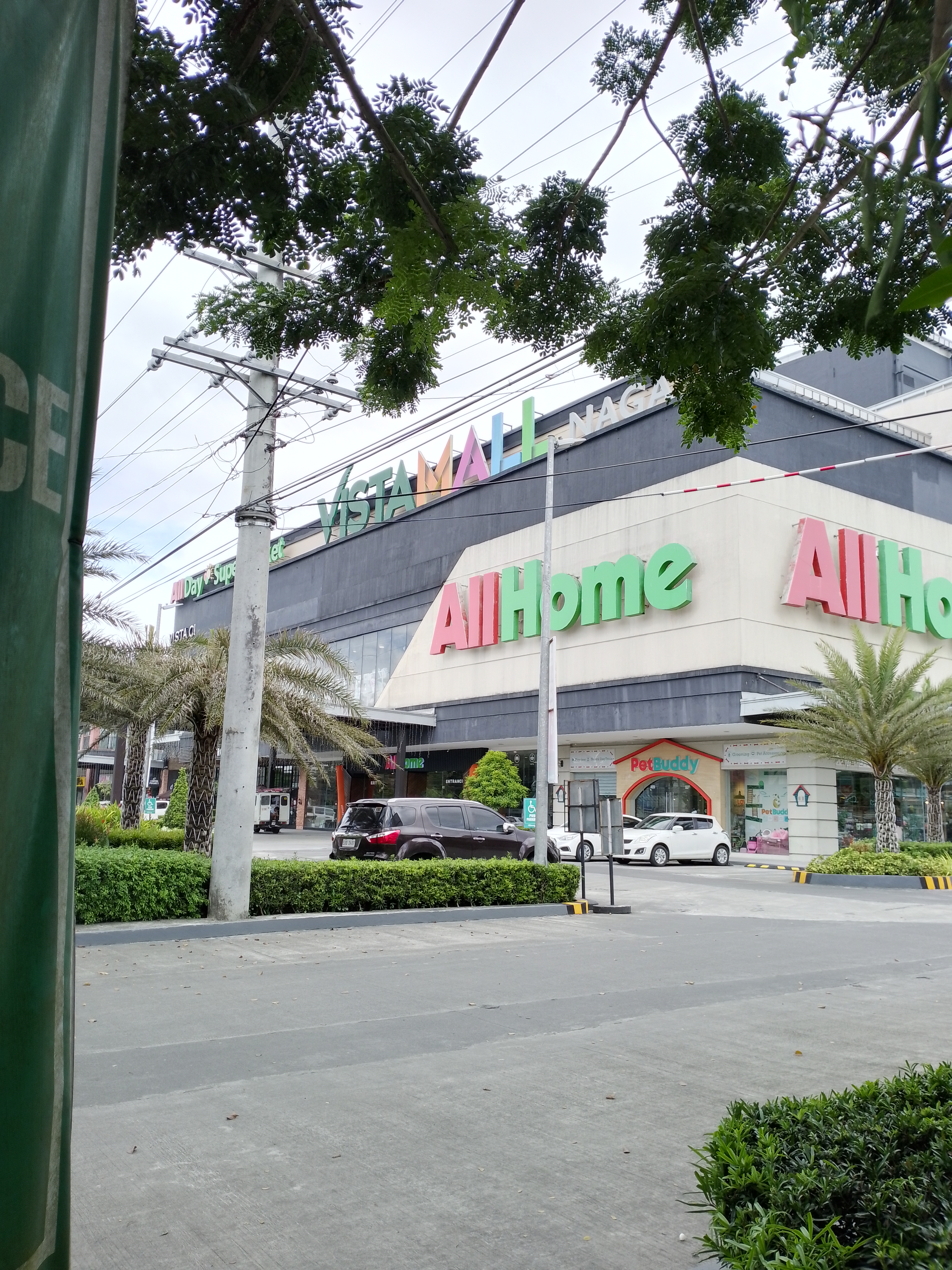
Vista Mall Naga
