= Vista Land =

Real estate developer in the Philippines

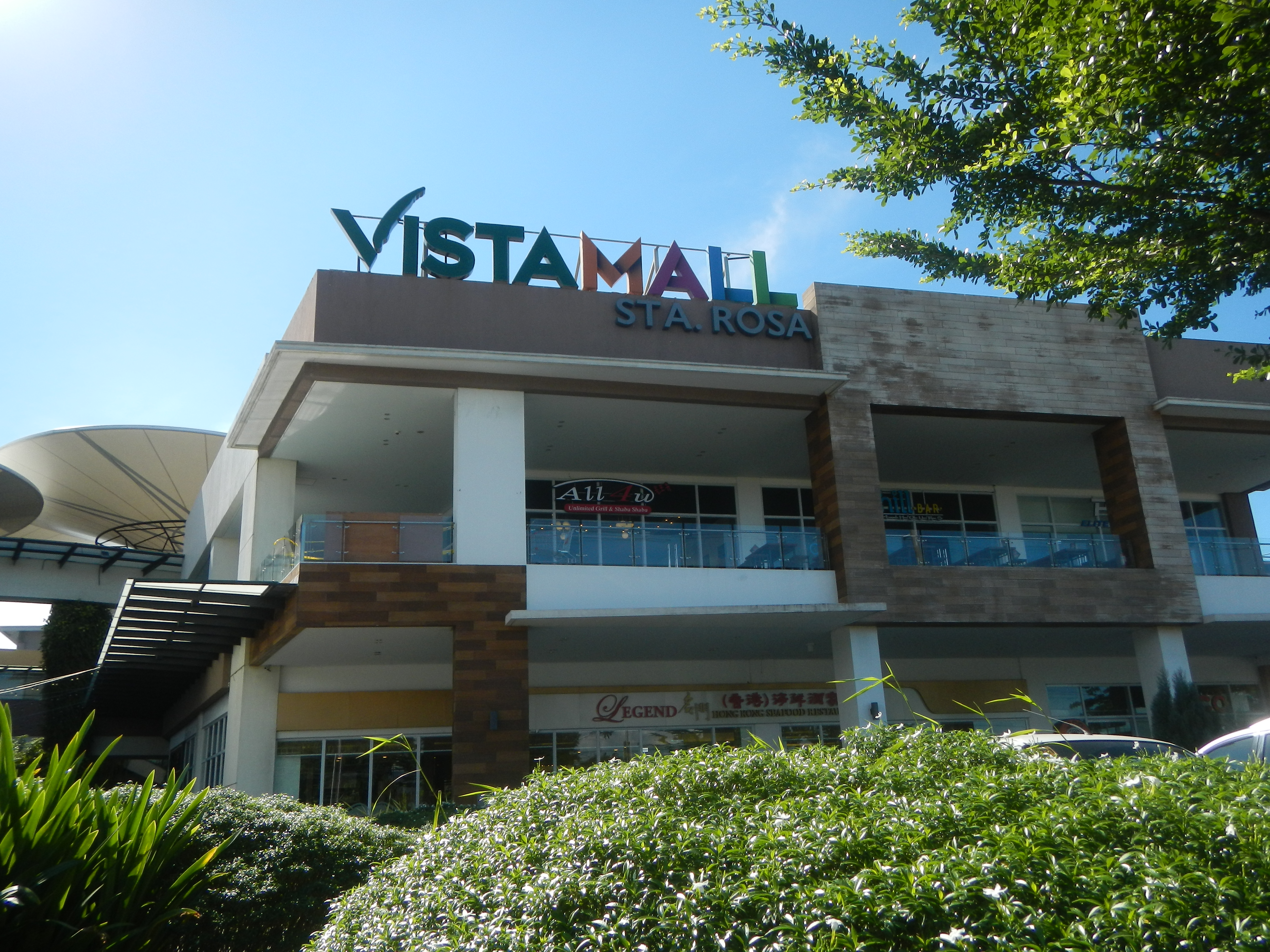
- Vista Mall Santa Rosa
- Traded as: PSE: VLL
- Industry: Real estate / Retail
- Founded: February 28, 2007; 19 years ago
- Founder: Manuel B. Villar Jr.
- Headquarters: Worldwide Corporate Center, Mandaluyong, Metro Manila, Philippines
- Key people: Manuel B. Villar Jr. (Chairman); Manuel "Paolo" A. Villar III (Vice Chairman, President and CEO); Cynthia Javarez (COO)
- Brands: Vista Malls
- Parent: Fine Properties
- Subsidiaries: Brittany Corporation; Crown Asia Properties; Vista Residences; Camella; Vista Manors; Lessandra; Communities Philippines; VLL International Inc. Lumina Homes
- Website: www.vistaland.com.ph

Vista Land & Lifescapes Inc. also known as simply Vista Land, is a property developer in the Philippines engaged in the real estate and retail industries. The company is part of the Villar Group of Companies associated with Manny Villar, along with the Starmalls, Inc. and Golden Haven, Inc.

== History ==
Vista Land was incorporated on February 28, 2007 as a holding company of the Vista Group, which is involved in the real estate industry as a developer of residential subdivisions and condominiums. It was publicly listed on the Philippine Stock Exchange in June of the same year.

== Organization ==
Vista Land's operations is divided into four segments: horizontal, vertical, commercial, and affordable housing. The first two involves the development and sale of residential properties, the third deals with the company's venture in the retail and business process outsourcing industry, and the last is involved with the development and management of other business including resorts, hotels, club, and spas as well as activities of its holding companies.

Vista Land has six subsidiaries namely Brittany Corporation, Crown Asia Properties, Vista Residences, Camella, Vista Manors, Lessandra, Communities Philippines, and VLL International Inc.

Vista Manors focuses on developing resort‑inspired “vertical villages” in key provincial cities, and has formed part of the Vista Land portfolio since at least the 2010s.”

In 2003, Vista Residences was established as the condominium arm. It builds vertical communities in central business districts, transportation networks, and university clusters, enhancing mobility and quality of life through comfortable and convenient city living.

In 2020, Vista Land created Lumina Homes as line of mass housing communities.

Vista Land also operates the Vista Malls shopping mall chain.
