= List of shopping malls in Metro Manila =

Provided here is a list of shopping malls in Metro Manila, the Philippines.

The first enclosed shopping mall in the metropolis was Crystal Arcade located along Escolta Street in the downtown district of Binondo. This art deco building designed by Andrés Luna de San Pedro also housed the Manila Stock Exchange and was the Philippines' first air-conditioned building inaugurated on June 1, 1932.

Prior to the Pacific War, Escolta Street was also home to the city's first standalone department stores, including H.E. Heacock, until then the largest department store in the Philippines, opening in 1900, and the Aguinaldo Department Store, the most premium store in the Philippines opening in 1921. Other notable stores in the 1920s and 1930s included the upscale La Puerta del Sol and Estrella del Norte.

The first shopping mall of the enclosed, automobile-centered design type was Ali Mall named after Mohammed Ali’s boxing victory against Joe Frazier, located in suburban Quezon City which opened in 1976. This was followed by Harrison Plaza in Malate district which opened later that same year.

== Major shopping centers ==
These super-regional supermalls each have over a hundred local and international stores and are anchored by at least one department store and supermarket or hypermarket. They are also the largest malls in Metro Manila which feature not just stores but also attractions: movie theaters, rides, skating rinks, bowling alleys and other recreational facilities. Each provides thousands of automobile parking spaces and are located mostly near rail stations and established business districts within the metropolis. These malls serve not only the Metro Manila and Greater Manila Area residents, but also local and foreign tourists.

Name	Image	Location	Developer	Retail Space (m^{2})	Year opened
Ayala Malls Manila Bay		Bay City, Parañaque	Ayala Land	400,000	2019
Festival Alabang		Corporate Avenue corner Civic Drive, Filinvest City, Alabang, Muntinlupa	Filinvest Land	400,000	1998
Gateway Mall		Gen. Aguinaldo Street, Araneta Center, Socorro, Quezon City	Araneta Group	300,000	2004
Glorietta		Ayala Avenue, Makati CBD, Makati	Ayala Land	250,000	1991
Greenbelt		Makati Avenue, Makati CBD, Makati	Ayala Land	250,000	1990
Robinsons Galleria		EDSA corner Ortigas Avenue, Ortigas Center, Quezon City	Robinsons Land	221,000	1990
Robinsons Manila		Pedro Gil Street corner Adriatico Street, Ermita, Manila	Robinsons Land	241,000	1997
SM Mall of Asia		José W. Diokno Boulevard, Bay City, Pasay	SM Prime Holdings	497,000	2006
SM Megamall		EDSA corner Julia Vargas Avenue, Ortigas Center, Mandaluyong	SM Prime Holdings	474,000	1991
SM North EDSA		EDSA corner North Avenue, Santo Cristo, Quezon City	SM Prime Holdings	477,000	1985

== Community malls ==
Community or regional shopping centers in Metro Manila are built around one department store or supermarket and are enclosed. These shopping centers are located mostly in suburban residential areas of the metropolis and typically cater to the basic shopping needs of area residents.

Robinsons Metro East

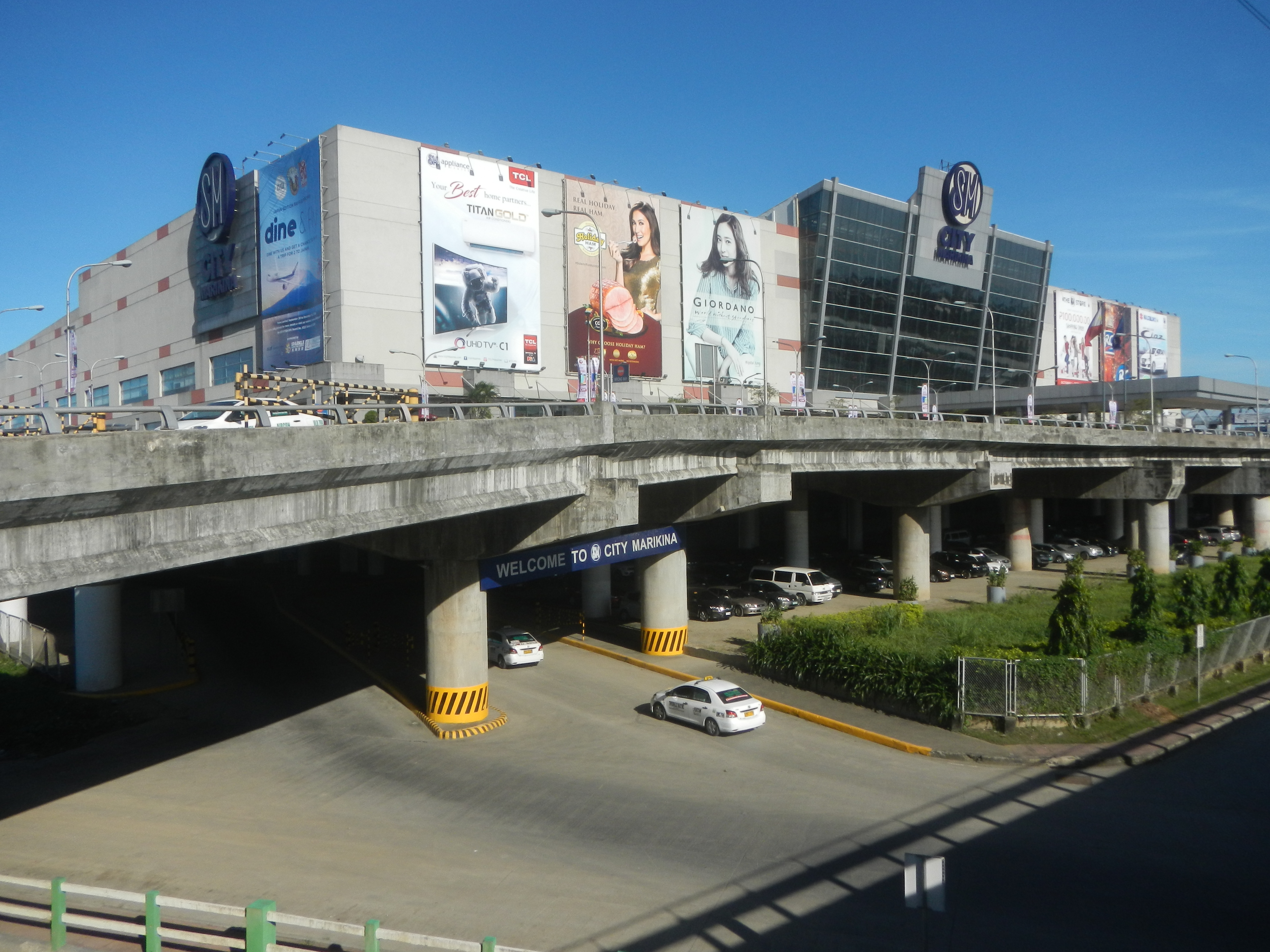
SM City Marikina

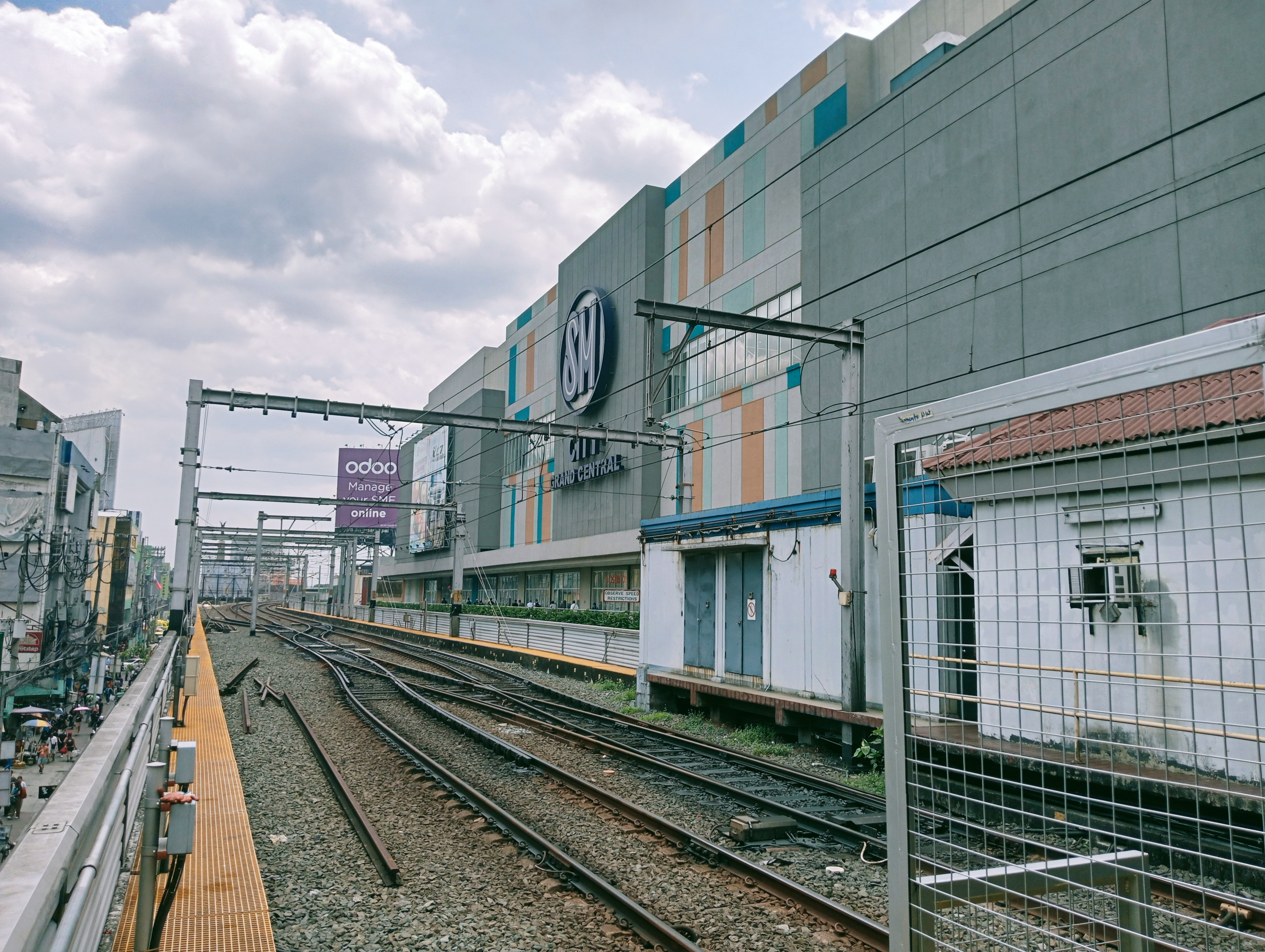
SM City Grand Central

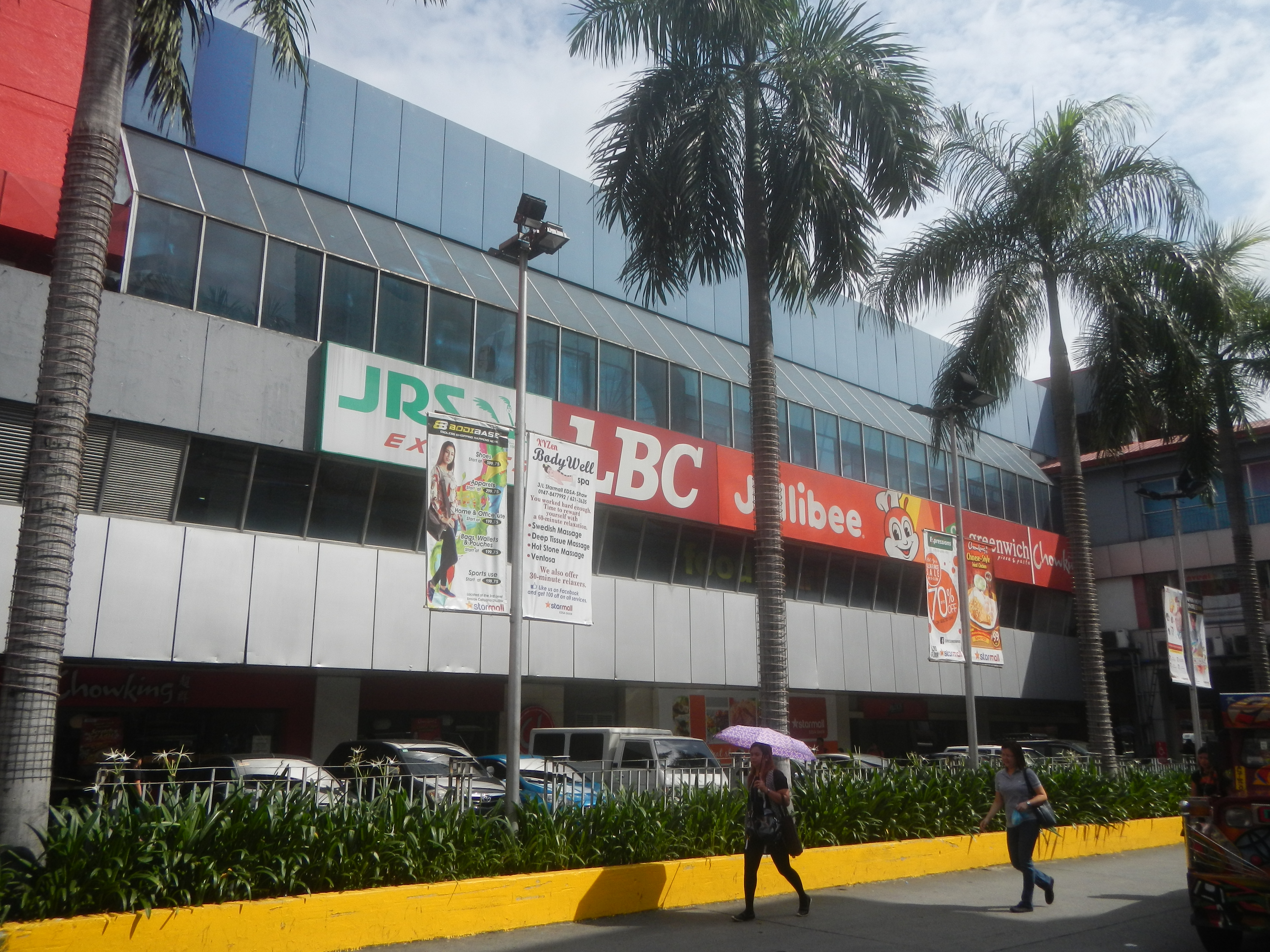
Driveway area of Starmall EDSA Shaw

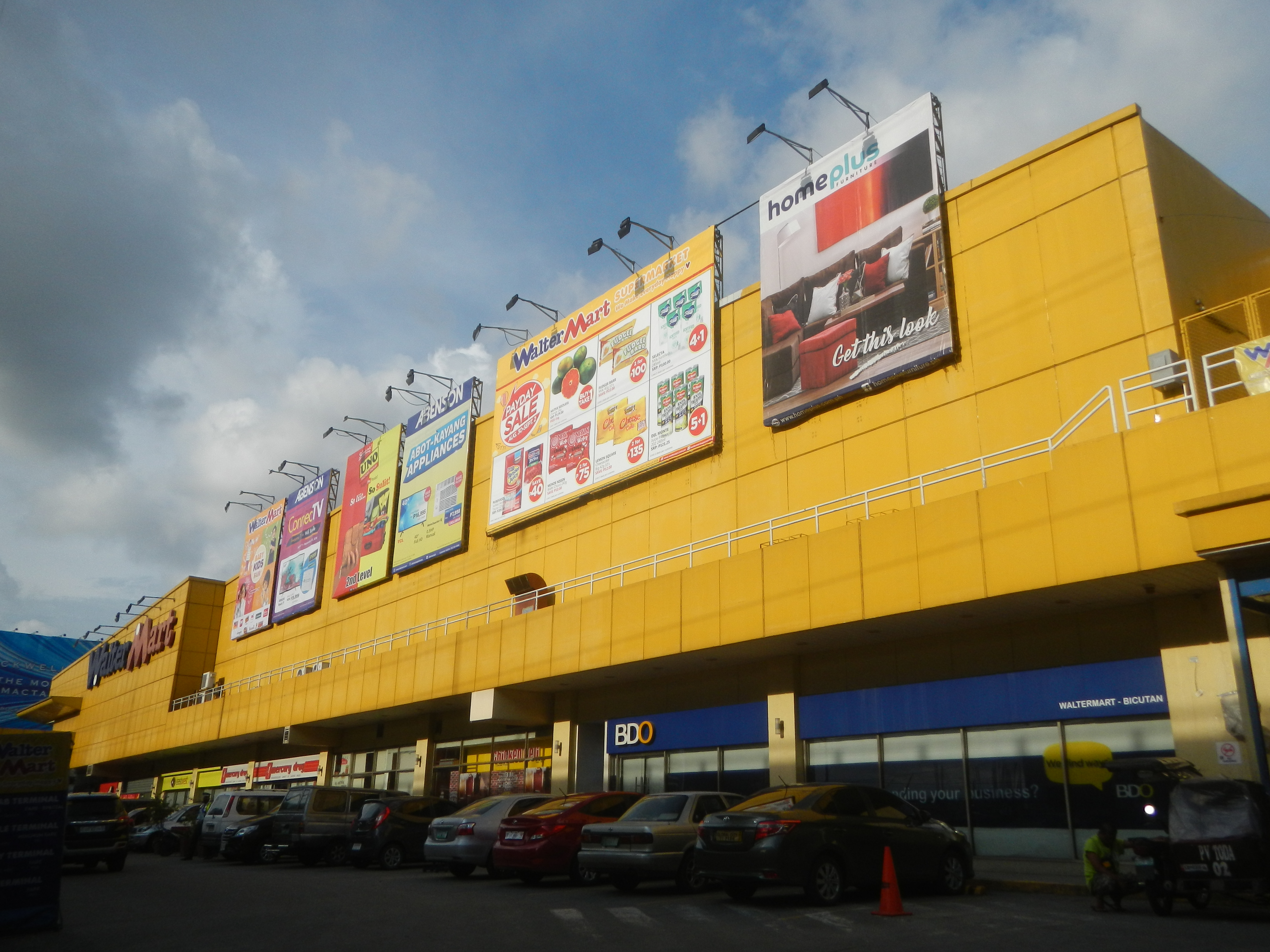
Walter Mart Bicutan

Vista Mall Taguig

Fisher Mall Quezon Avenue

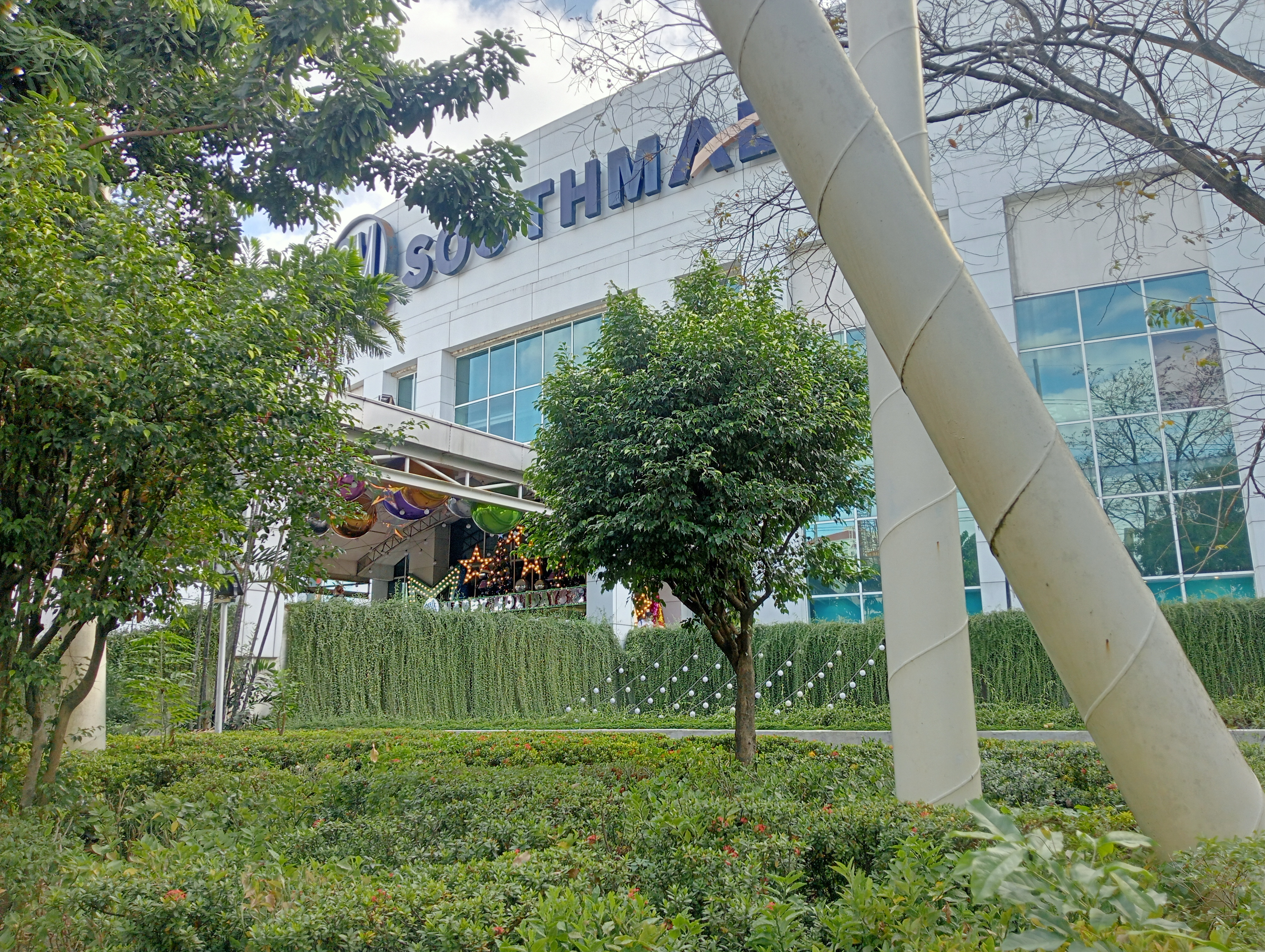
SM Southmall

SM City Fairview

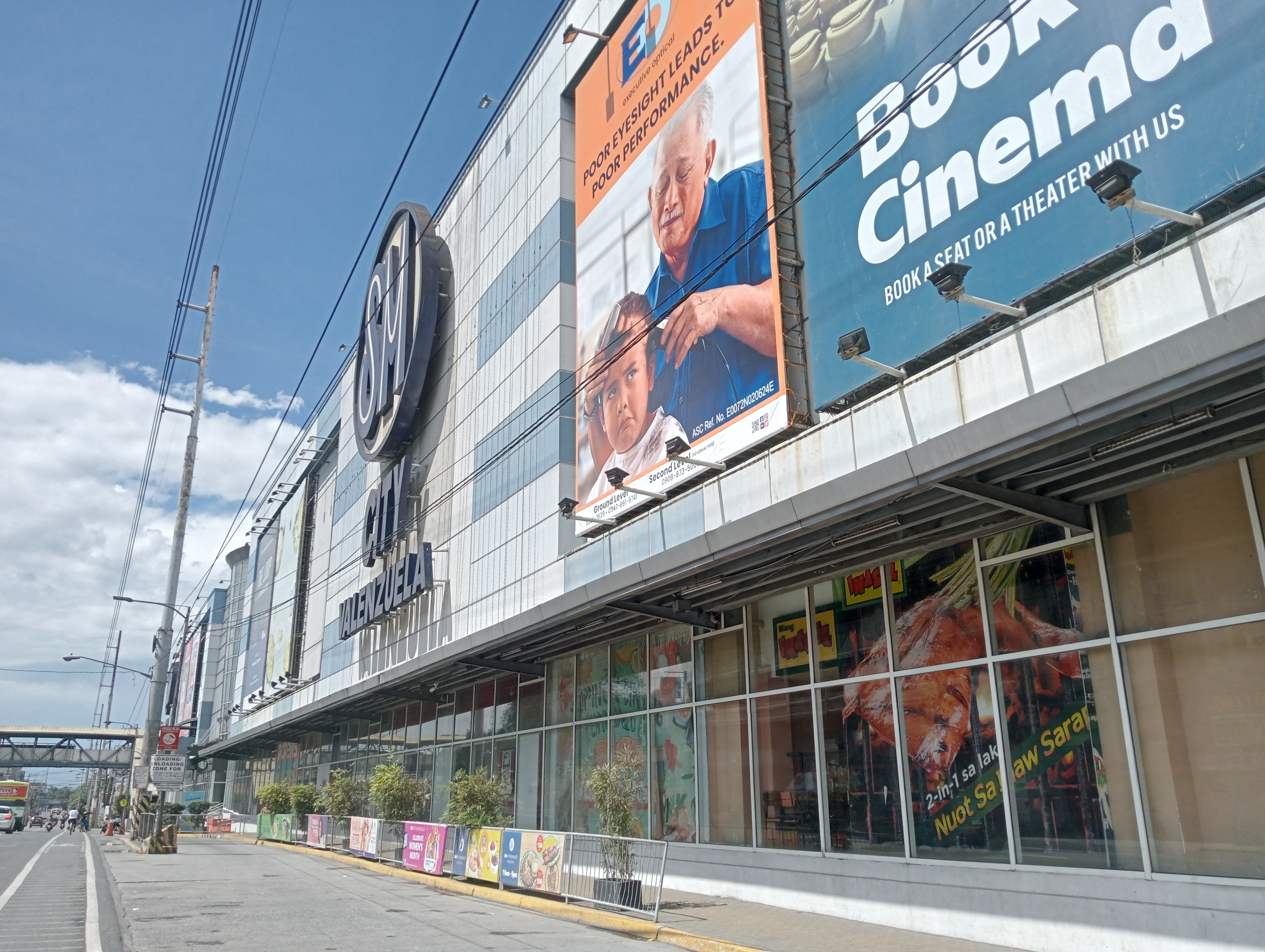
SM City Valenzuela

Name	Location	Developer
500 Shaw Zentrum	Mandaluyong	Lica Land
Agora Mall	Pedro Cruz, San Juan	
Ali Mall	Araneta Center, Quezon City	Araneta Group
Anonas City Center	Quezon City	
Araneta Square	Caloocan	
Berkeley Square	Quezon City	
Cash & Carry Mall	Palanan, Makati	
Circle C Center	Quezon City	
Colours Town Center	Las Piñas	
Deca Mall	Tondo, Manila	
Ever Gotesco Mall Commonwealth Center	Quezon City	
Fairview Center Mall	Quezon City	
Farmers Plaza	Araneta Center, Quezon City	Araneta Group
Fisher Mall Malabon	Malabon	
Fisher Mall Quezon Avenue	Quezon City	
Graceland Plaza	Marikina	RMR Group of Companies
Guadalupe Commercial Center	Makati	
Happy Go Shopping Mall	Valenzuela	
Hemady Square	Quezon City	
HK Sun Plaza	Pasay	
Il Terrazzo Mall	Quezon City	
Isetann Carriedo	Santa Cruz, Manila	Joymart Consolidated
Isetann Cinerama Recto	Quiapo, Manila	Joymart Consolidated
Isetann Cubao	Araneta Center, Quezon City	Joymart Consolidated
Jackman Plaza	Quezon City	
Lucky Gold Plaza	Pasig	
Makati Square	Makati	
Malabon Citisquare	Malabon	
Metro Point Mall	Pasay	Ayala Land
Metro Towne Center	Las Piñas	
Novaliches Plaza Mall	Quezon City	
One Mall Valenzuela	Valenzuela	
Pearl Plaza	Parañaque	
Riverbanks Center	Barangka, Marikina	
RMR Square	Tandang Sora, Quezon City	RMR Group of Companies
Robinsons Metro East	Pasig	Robinsons Land
Robinsons Novaliches	Novaliches, Quezon City	Robinsons Land
Robinsons Otis	Paco, Manila	Robinsons Land
Robinsons Las Piñas	Las Piñas	Robinsons Land
Robinsons Malabon	Malabon	Robinsons Land
Robinsons Townville Regalado	Quezon City	Robinsons Retail Holdings, Inc.
Shaw Center Mall	Mandaluyong	
SM Center Congressional	Quezon City	SM Prime Holdings
SM Center Las Piñas	Las Piñas	SM Prime Holdings
SM Center Muntinlupa	Muntinlupa	SM Prime Holdings
SM Center Pasig	Ortigas Center, Pasig	SM Prime Holdings
SM Center Sangandaan	Caloocan	SM Prime Holdings
SM Center Shaw	Mandaluyong	SM Prime Holdings
SM City BF Parañaque	BF Homes, Parañaque	SM Prime Holdings
SM City Bicutan	Don Bosco, Parañaque	SM Prime Holdings
SM City Caloocan	Bagumbong, Caloocan	SM Prime Holdings
SM City East Ortigas	Pasig	SM Prime Holdings
SM City Fairview	Quirino Highway, Quezon City	SM Prime Holdings
SM City Grand Central	Caloocan	SM Prime Holdings
SM City Manila	Ermita, Manila	SM Prime Holdings
SM City Marikina	Marikina	SM Prime Holdings
SM City Novaliches	San Bartolome, Quezon City	SM Prime Holdings
SM City San Lazaro	Santa Cruz, Manila, Manila	SM Prime Holdings
SM City Sta. Mesa	Quezon City	SM Prime Holdings
SM City Sucat	San Dionisio, Parañaque	SM Prime Holdings
SM City Valenzuela	Karuhatan, Valenzuela	SM Prime Holdings
SM Southmall	Alabang–Zapote Road, Almanza Uno, Las Piñas	SM Prime Holdings
South Station	Alabang, Muntinlupa	Filinvest Land
Star J Mall	Malabon	
Starmall EDSA Shaw	Ortigas Center, Mandaluyong	Vista Land
Starmall Las Piñas Annex	Las Piñas	Vista Land
The Marketplace Mall	Mandaluyong	
Tutuban Center (Main Building)	Tondo, Manila	Prime Orion Philippines, Inc.; Ayala Property Management Corp.
UNITOP Santa Mesa	Santa Mesa, Manila	RI-RANCE Realty Corporation
University Mall	Malate, Manila	
Uniwide Metromall	Las Piñas	Uniwide Sales, Inc.
Ushio Mall	Pasay	
Victory Central Mall	Caloocan	
Victory Pasay Mall	Pasay	
Vista Mall Lakefront	Muntinlupa	Vista Land
Vista Mall Las Piñas	Las Piñas	Vista Land
Vista Mall Taguig	Taguig	Vista Land
W Mall	Bay City, Pasay	WM Property Management Inc. and SM Investment Corp.
WalterMart Bicutan	Parañaque	WM Property Management Inc. and SM Investment Corp.
WalterMart E. Rodriguez	Quezon City	WM Property Management Inc. and SM Investment Corp.
WalterMart Makati	Makati	WM Property Management Inc. and SM Investment Corp.
WalterMart North EDSA	Quezon City	WM Property Management Inc. and SM Investment Corp.
WalterMart Sucat	Parañaque	WM Property Management Inc. and SM Investment Corp.
Z Square Mall	Manresa, Quezon City	
Zabarte Town Center	Camarin, Caloocan	

== Lifestyle malls ==
Lifestyle centers in Metro Manila are located in upscale business districts and affluent areas like Makati CBD, Ortigas Center, and Bonifacio Global City. Many of these boutique malls are open-air and are popular dining and entertainment venues for Manila's elite.

Robinsons Magnolia

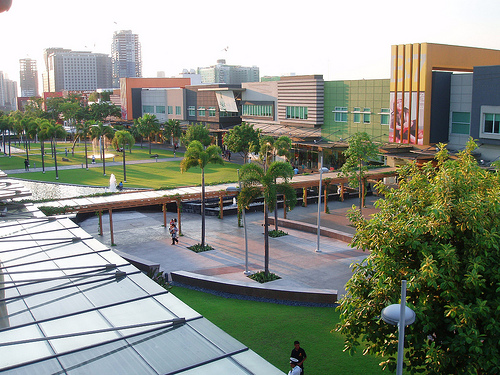
Bonifacio High Street

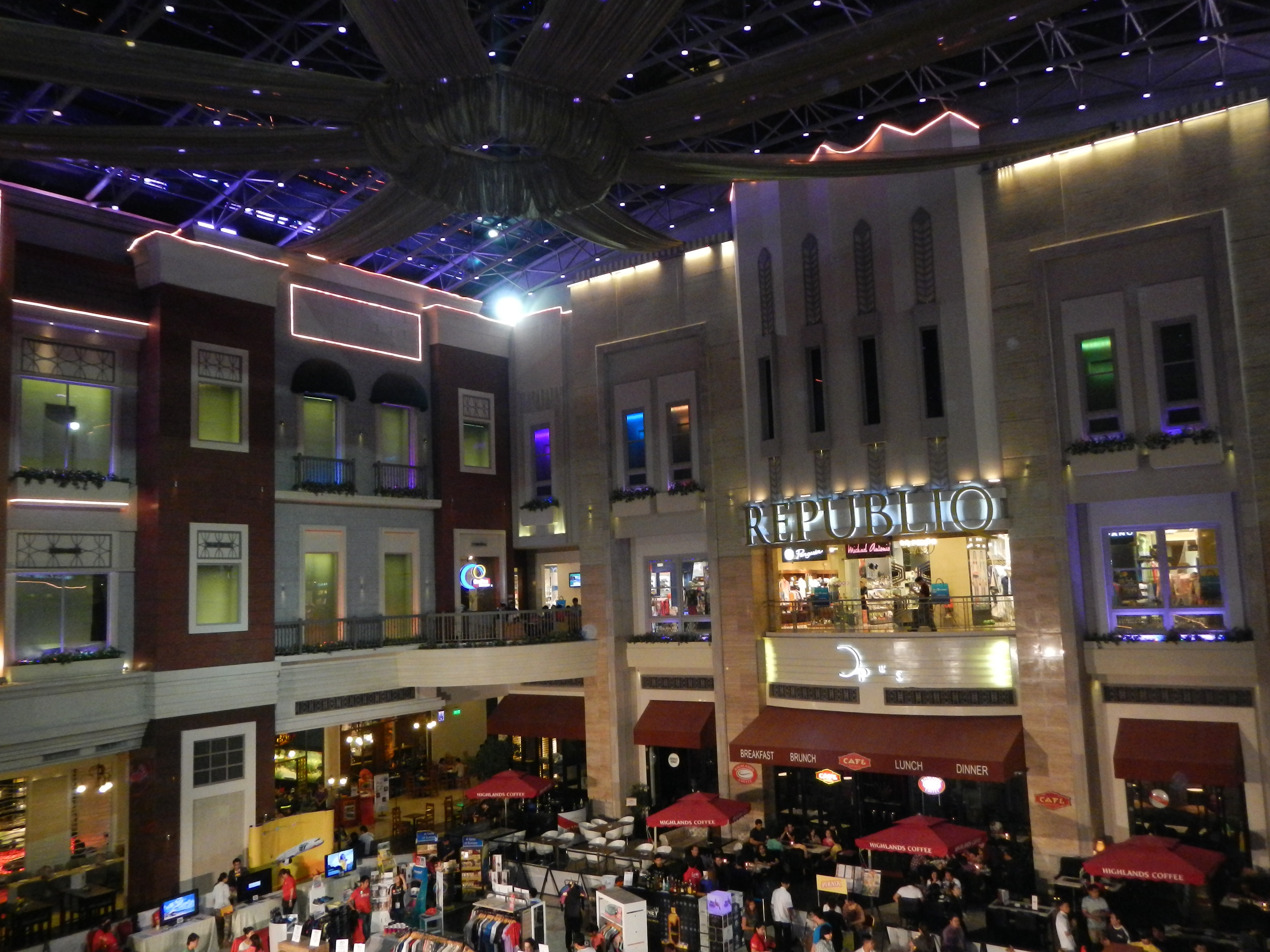
Newport Mall

Ayala Malls Feliz

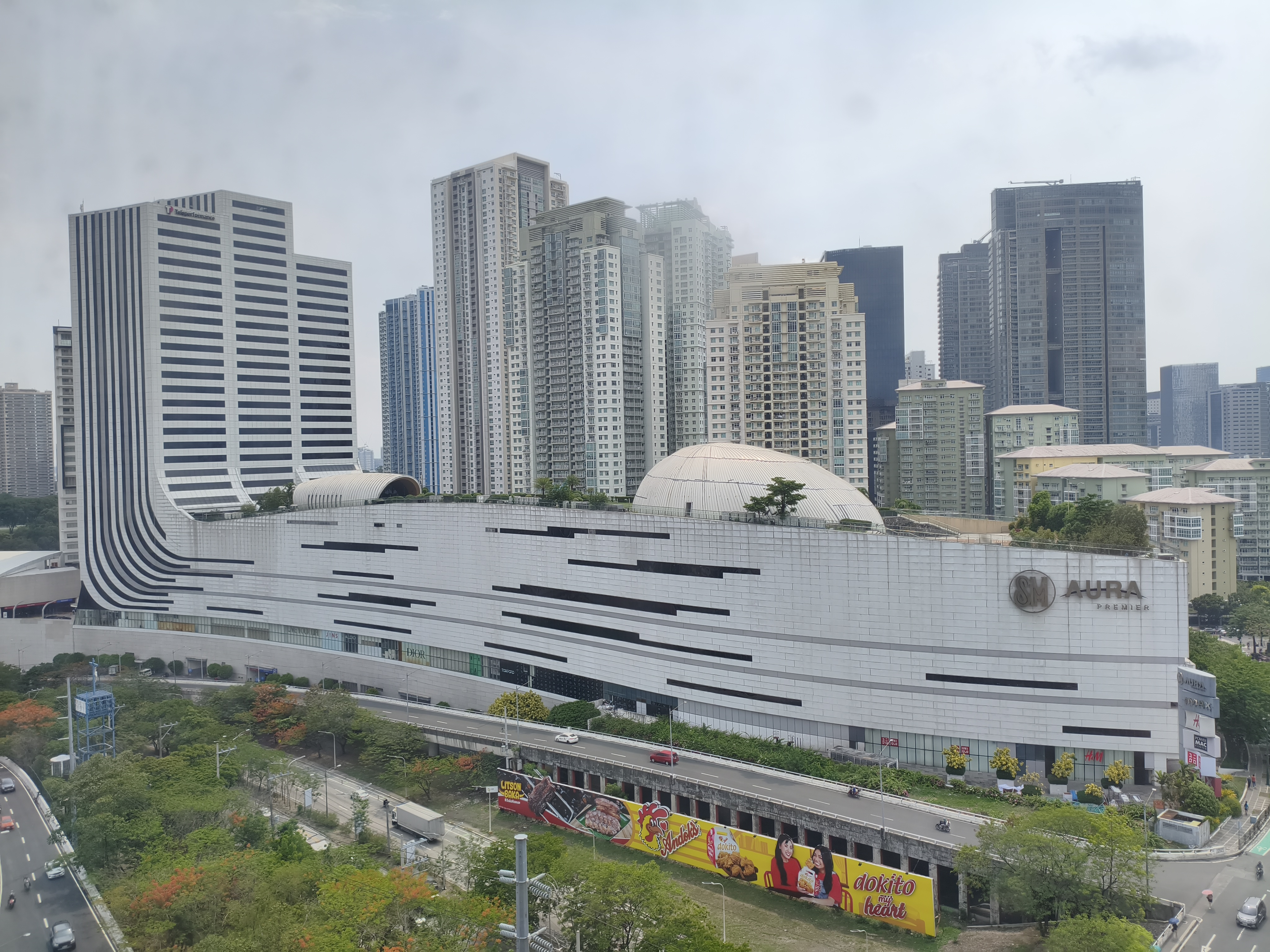
SM Aura

Century City Mall

Name	Location	Developer
Alabang Town Center	Alabang–Zapote Road, Ayala Alabang, Muntinlupa	Rockwell Land
Alabang West Parade	Alabang West, Las Piñas	Megaworld Corporation
Arcovia Parade	Arcovia City, Pasig	Megaworld Corporation
Ayala Malls Arca South	Western Bicutan, Taguig	Ayala Land
Ayala Malls Circuit	Carmona, Makati	Ayala Land
Ayala Malls Cloverleaf	Balingasa, Quezon City	Ayala Land
Ayala Malls Feliz	Dela Paz, Pasig	Ayala Land
Ayala Malls Marikina	Marikina Heights, Marikina	Ayala Land
Ayala Malls South Park	Alabang, Muntinlupa	Ayala Land
Ayala Malls The 30th	Ugong, Pasig	Ayala Land
Ayala Malls Vertis North	Triangle Park, Quezon City	Ayala Land
Bonifacio High Street	Bonifacio Global City, Taguig	Ayala Land
Central Square	Bonifacio Global City, Taguig	SSI Group
Century City Mall	Poblacion, Makati	Century Properties
Commercenter	Alabang, Muntinlupa	Philippine Allied Enterprises Corp.
Eastwood Mall	Eastwood City, Quezon City	Megaworld Corporation
Estancia Mall	Kapitolyo, Pasig	Ortigas & Company
Eton Centris	Quezon City	Eton Properties
Evia Lifestyle Center	Daang Hari Road, Las Piñas	Vista Land
Fairview Terraces	Quirino Highway corner Maligaya Drive, Quezon City	Ayala Land
Floriad Lifestyle	Las Piñas	Vista Land
Forbes Town Center	Bonifacio Global City, Taguig	Megaworld Corporation
Greenhills	Greenhills, San Juan	Ortigas & Company
Industria Mall	Circulo Verde, Quezon City	Ortigas & Company
Lucky Chinatown	Binondo, Manila	Megaworld Corporation
Market! Market!	26th Street corner C-5 Road, Bonifacio Global City, Taguig	Ayala Land
Met Live	Bay City, Pasay	Federal Land
Mitsukoshi BGC	Bonifacio Global City, Taguig	Mitsukoshi
Newport Mall	Newport City, Pasay	Megaworld Corporation
Opus Mall	Libis, Quezon City	Robinsons Land
Power Plant Mall	Rockwell Drive corner Estrella Street, Poblacion, Makati	Lopez Holdings
Robinsons Magnolia	New Manila, Quezon City	Robinsons Land
Santolan Town Plaza	Little Baguio, San Juan	Lopez Holdings
Shangri-La Plaza	EDSA corner Shaw Boulevard, Ortigas Center, Mandaluyong	Shang Properties
SM Araneta City	Araneta City, Quezon City	SM Prime Holdings
SM Aura	McKinley Parkway cor 26th Street, Bonifacio Global City, Taguig	SM Prime Holdings
SM Makati	Ayala Center, Makati	SM Prime Holdings
The Grove by Rockwell Retail Row	Ugong, Pasig	Lopez Holdings
The Village Square Alabang	Las Piñas	Megaworld Corporation
Tuscany at McKinley Hill	Bonifacio Global City, Taguig	Megaworld Corporation
Trinoma	EDSA corner North Avenue, Diliman, Quezon City	Ayala Land
U.P. Town Center	Katipunan Avenue, U.P. Campus, Quezon City	Ayala Land
Uptown Mall	Bonifacio Global City, Taguig	Megaworld Corporation
Venice Grand Canal	Pinagsama, Taguig	Megaworld Corporation

== Strip malls ==
Strip malls consist mainly of food outlets and several stores and businesses sharing one parking lot. These casual dining and retail centers have become popular hangouts among young professionals in Manila.

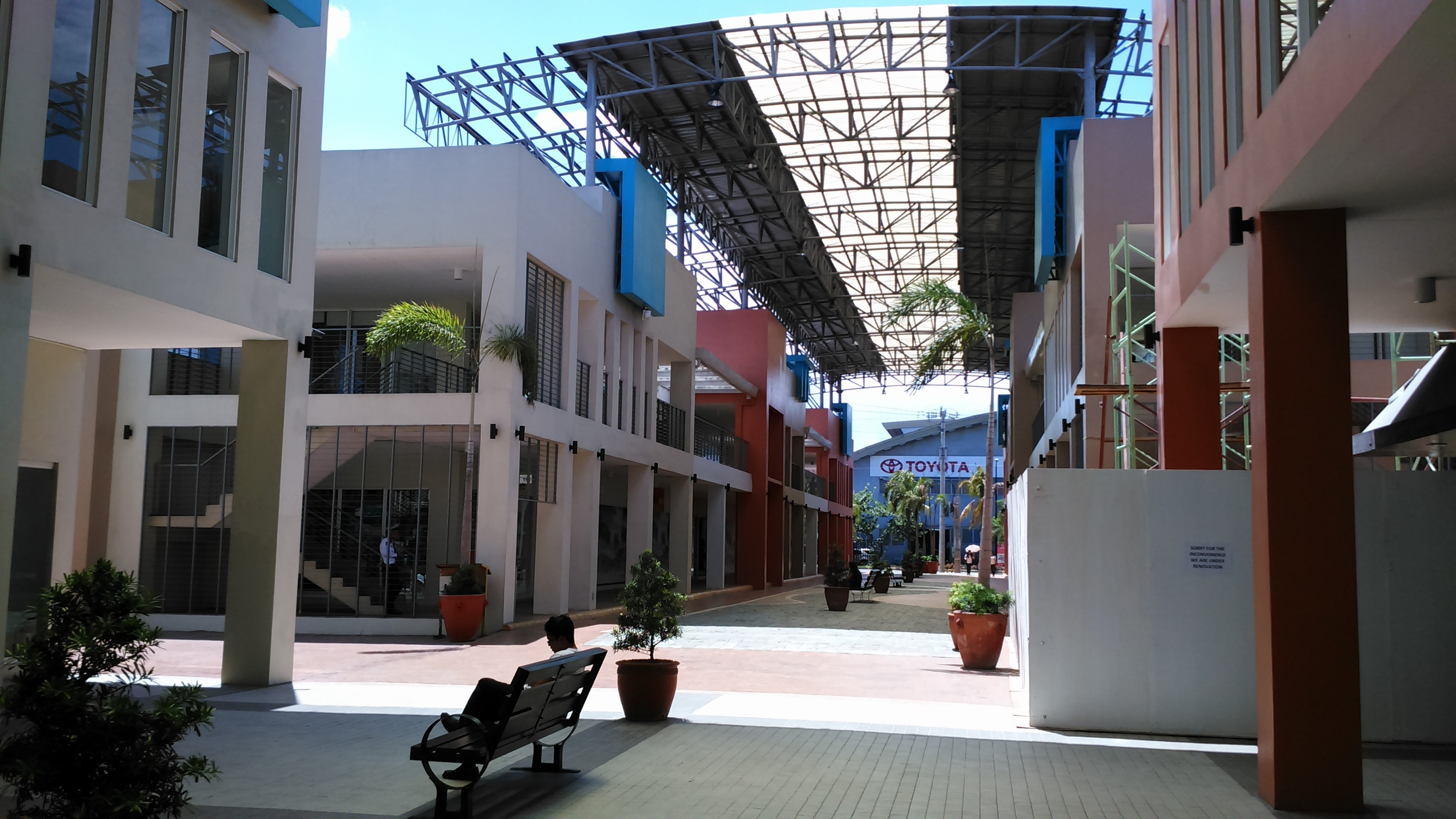
Blue Bay Walk

Pavilion at Greenfield District

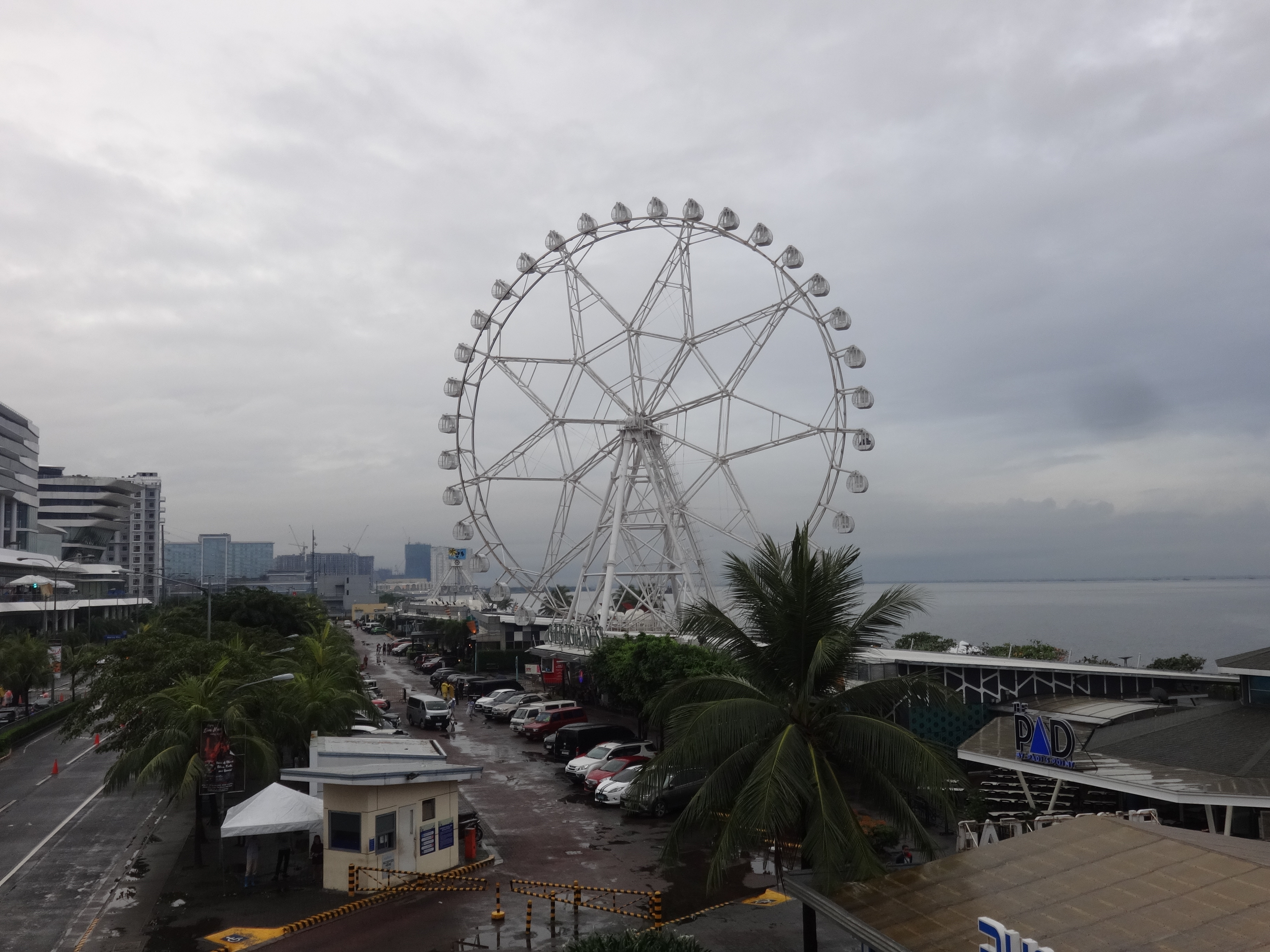
SM By The Bay

Name	Location
Active Fun	Bonifacio Global City, Taguig
Blue Bay Walk	Bay City, Pasay
Blue Wave Mall Marikina	Marikina
Bonifacio Stop Over	Bonifacio Global City, Taguig
C&B Circle Mall	Marikina Heights, Marikina
Centris Station	Triangle Park, Quezon City
Crossroads	Bonifacio Global City, Taguig
Eastwood CityWalk	Eastwood City, Quezon City
Forum South Global	Bonifacio Global City, Taguig
Gate 3 Plaza	Western Bicutan, Taguig
Harbour Square	Malate, Manila
Jaka Plaza	San Antonio, Parañaque
Lakefront Boardwalk	Sucat, Muntinlupa
Mandala Park	Mandaluyong
Madison Square Greenhills	Greenhills, San Juan
Madison Square Las Piñas	Las Piñas
Madison Square Pioneer	Mandaluyong
Manila Ocean Park Mall	Ermita, Manila
Metrowalk	Ugong, Pasig
Molito	Alabang, Muntinlupa
One Parkade	Bonifacio Global City, Taguig
Paseo de Magallanes	Makati
Pavilion at Greenfield District	Mandaluyong
Pearl Drive Commercial Center	Quezon City
Pioneer Center	Kapitolyo, Pasig
Plaza 66	Newport City, Pasay
San Antonio Plaza	Forbes Park, Makati
San Antonio Shopping Center	Parañaque
Santana Grove	San Antonio, Parañaque
Silver City	Ortigas East, Ugong, Pasig
SM by the Bay	Bay City, Pasay
Sunshine Boulevard Plaza	Quezon City
The Clubhouse at Temple Drive	Quezon City
The Hub at Greenfield District	Mandaluyong
The Portal at Greenfield District	Mandaluyong
The Terminal (Vista Terminal Exchange)	Alabang, Muntinlupa
Two Parkade	Bonifacio Global City, Taguig
U.N. Square	United Nations Avenue Ermita, Manila
U.P.-Ayala Land Technohub	U.P. Campus, Quezon City
Westgate Center	Alabang, Muntinlupa

== Retail podiums ==
These retail centers are located within major office, hotel and residential buildings in business districts and townships around Metro Manila containing several dozen stores in the building's central atrium or podium.

Name	Building	Location
Alphaland Makati Place Mall	Alphaland Makati Place	Bel-Air, Makati
Alphaland Southgate Mall	Alphaland Southgate Tower	Magallanes, Makati
Arton Strip	The Arton by Rockwell	Loyola Heights, Quezon City
Ayala Malls One Ayala	One Ayala	Ayala Center, Makati
DMG Plaza	California Garden Square	Mandaluyong
DoubleDragon Plaza Podium	DoubleDragon Plaza	Bay City, Pasay
Eastwood Cyber and Fashion Mall	Cyber One Plaza	Eastwood City, Quezon City
EWestMall	Eton WestEnd Square	Makati
Fame Mall	Fame Residences	Mandaluyong
Grace Mall	Grace Residences	Taguig
Green Mall	Green Residences	Malate, Manila
Jazz Mall	SM Jazz Residences	Bel-air, Makati
Light Mall	SM Light Residences	Mandaluyong
M Place Mall South Triangle	M Place South Triangle	South Triangle, Quezon City
Mezza Strip	SM Mezza Residences	Doña Imelda, Quezon City
One E-com Plaza	One E-comCenter	Bay City, Pasay
Paseo Center	Paseo Center IT Building	Makati
Prism Plaza @ Five E-comCenter	Five E-comCenter	Bay City, Pasay
Prism Plaza @ Two E-comCenter	Two E-comCenter	Bay City, Pasay
RCBC Plaza Podium	RCBC Plaza	Bel-air, Makati
R Square Mall	R Square Residences	Malate, Manila
S Maison	Conrad Manila	Bay City, Pasay
San Lorenzo Place Podium	San Lorenzo Place	San Lorenzo, Makati
Serendra Piazza	Serendra	Bonifacio Global City, Taguig
Shoppes @ Victoria	Victoria Towers	Diliman, Quezon City
Shoppes @ Victoria	Victoria de Manila	Malate, Manila
Spark Place	Spark Place	Araneta Center, Quezon City
Sun Mall	Sun Residences	Santa Teresita, Quezon City
Sunsonic Electronics Plaza	Sun Star Grand Hotel	Quiapo, Manila
Techno Plaza 2	Techno Plaza 2	Eastwood City, Quezon City
The One Grand Center	The One Santo Tomas	Sampaloc, Manila
The Enterprise Center	The Enterprise Center Tower 1	Makati
The Shoppes at Solaire Resort & Casino	Solaire Resort & Casino	Bay City, Parañaque
The Shops at Ayala North Exchange	Ayala North Exchange Towers	Pio del Pilar, Makati
The Shops at Okada Manila	Okada Manila	Bay City, Parañaque
The Shops at the Boulevard	City of Dreams Manila	Bay City, Parañaque
Two E-com Plaza	Two E-com Center	Bay City, Pasay
The Podium	BDO Corporate Center	Ortigas Center, Mandaluyong
Three Central	Three Central Makati	Bel-air, Makati
Times Plaza	Times Plaza United Nations LRT Station	United Nations Avenue Ermita, Manila
W Global Center	W Global Center	Bonifacio Global City, Taguig
Wil Tower Mall	Wil Tower	Diliman, Quezon City
Worldwide Corporate Center	Worldwide Corporate Center	Mandaluyong

== Duty-free shopping centers ==
Located within a few miles of Ninoy Aquino International Airport, the Duty Free Philippines FiestaMall and Luxe Duty Free cater to the duty-free shopping needs of international travelers, tourists, and balikbayan people (Filipino nationals who are residents abroad).

Name	Location
Duty Free Philippines Fiesta Mall	Parañaque
Luxe Duty Free	Pasay

== Bargain malls and open-air shopping plazas ==
Bargain malls in Manila are popular among locals and tourists alike. These independent retailers are mostly housed in enclosed malls which often spill into surrounding streets. They sell everything from ready-to-wear clothes, electronic items to jewelries.

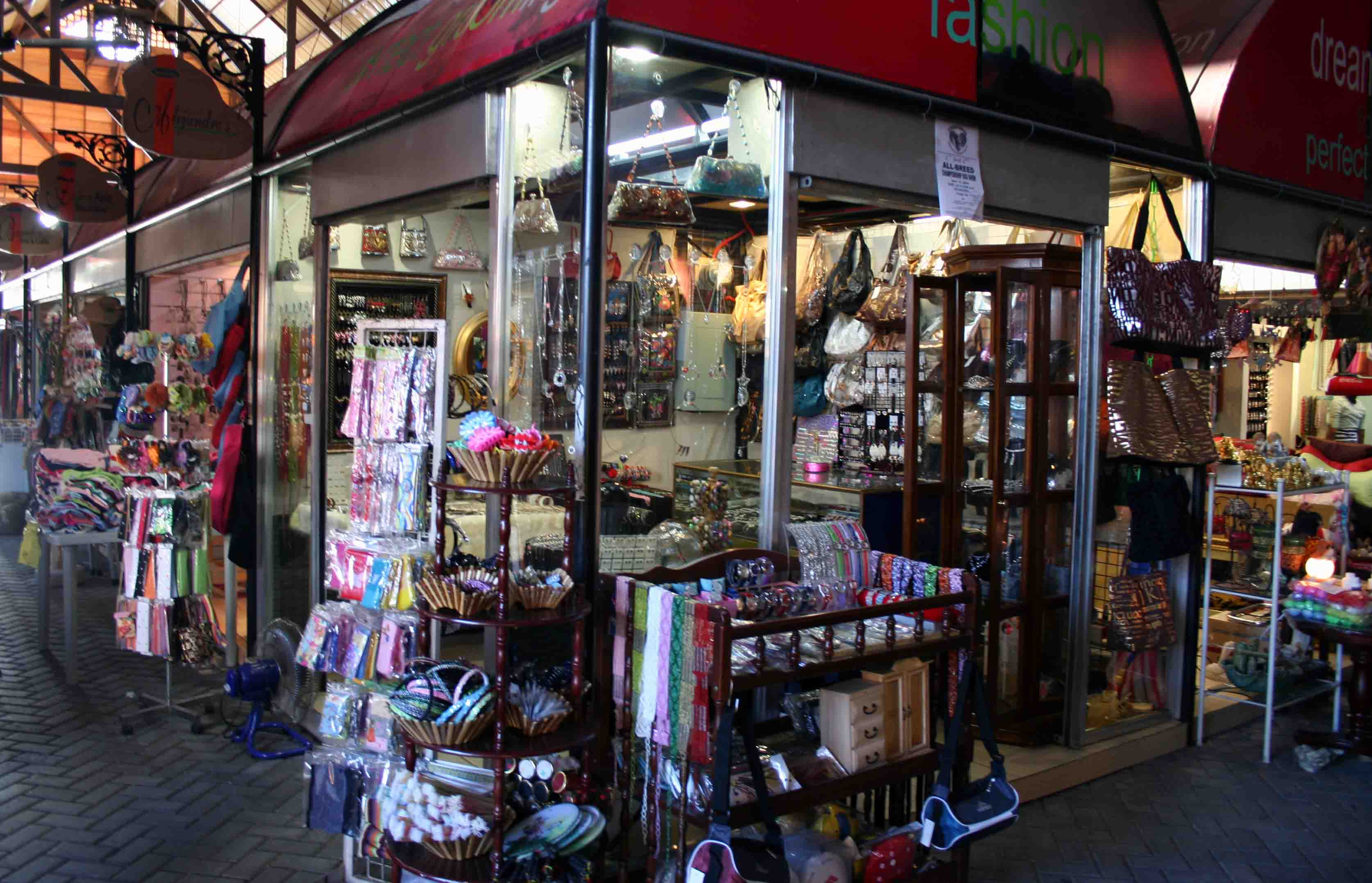
Tiendesitas

168 Shopping Mall

Name	Location
11/88 Mall	Binondo, Manila
168 Shopping Mall	Binondo, Manila
999 Shopping Mall	Binondo, Manila
Baclaran Bagong Milenyo Plaza	Pasay
Baclaran Galleria Shopping Mall	Pasay
Baclaran Supermall	Pasay
Baclaran Terminal Plaza	Pasay
D8 Mall (Dragon8 Shopping Center)	Tondo, Manila
Harrison Wholesale Center	Pasay
Kai Mall	Caloocan
Odeon Terminal Mall	Santa Cruz, Manila
Plaza Miranda Mall	Quiapo, Manila
Shoppesville Arcade	Greenhills, San Juan
SM Quiapo	Quiapo, Manila
St. Francis Square Mall	Ortigas Center, Mandaluyong
Tiendesitas	Ugong, Pasig
Tutuban Center (Primeblock)	Tondo, Manila
Two Shopping Center	Pasay

== Under construction ==
Location	Remarks
Parklinks, Quezon City	A 52,000-square-metre (560,000 ft^{2}) regional shopping mall being developed by the joint venture of Ayala Land and LT Group on 35 hectares (86 acres) of property along C-5 Road at the border of Quezon City and Pasig by the Marikina River.
Almanza Dos, Las Piñas	A 6,000-square-metre (65,000 ft^{2}) mall along Daang Hari Road in Las Piñas.
Bay City, Parañaque	The retail component of Megaworld Corporation's Westside City, a 31-hectare (77-acre) mixed-use development in Parañaque that will also house the fourth integrated resort of Entertainment City called Westside City Resorts World. This lifestyle mall and its casino complex is expected to start initial operations in 2023.

== Defunct ==
Name	Location	Type	Developer	Year closed	Remarks
A. Venue Mall	Poblacion, Makati	Strip mall		2019	Closed in 2019.
Airport Citimall	Parañaque	Community mall		2003	
El Pueblo Real de Manila	Julia Vargas Avenue, Ortigas Center, Pasig	Strip mall		2021	Closed in July 2021.
Ever Center Las Piñas	Alabang-Zapote Road, Las Piñas	Community mall	Ever Gotesco Malls	1997	
Ever Gotesco Grand Central	Rizal Avenue Extension, Monumento, Caloocan	Community mall	Ever Gotesco Malls	2012	Acquired by SM Prime Holdings after a fire destroyed the original structure. The location is now where the new building of SM City Grand Central now stands.
Ever Manila Plaza	Recto Avenue, Manila	Community mall	Ever Gotesco Malls	2020	
Forum Robinsons	EDSA, Barangka Ilaya, Mandaluyong	Community mall	Robinsons Malls	2022	Closed in April 2022.
Harrison Plaza	Adriatico Street, Malate, Manila	Community mall	SM Prime	2019	Closed at the end of 2019, but will be planned for renovation as SM Harrison to be opened in 2027.
Philcoa Citimall	Quezon City	Community mall		2023	
RFC Mall Las Piñas	Las Piñas	Community mall		2017	
Royal Family Mall	Maysan Road, Valenzuela	Community mall		2010	Converted into Puregold Paso de Blas.
Starmall Alabang	SLEX, Alabang, Muntinlupa	Community mall	Starmalls	2022	Closed in January 2022 due to fire. Redeveloped as The Terminal or Vista Terminal Exchange (VTX).
Sunshine Plaza Mall	FTI Complex, Taguig	Community mall		2025	
The Fort Strip	Bonifacio Global City, Taguig	Strip mall		2025	Closed on January 1, 2025.
Uniwide Coastal Mall	Macapagal Boulevard, Tambo, Parañaque	Community mall	Uniwide Sales	2014	Permanently closed last 2014, and demolished in 2022.

== See also ==
- List of shopping malls in the Philippines
- List of largest shopping malls in the Philippines
