= Ginés Serrán-Pagán =

Spanish artist

Ginés Serrán-Pagán (born September 18, 1949) is a Spanish artist. He has had 250 individual and group exhibitions in 25 countries. Serrán-Pagán has created over 3,800 sculptures, paintings and ceramics, collected by numerous private collectors, institutions and museums, including the Guggenheim Museum of New York.

== Biography ==
Serrán-Pagán is born in the peninsula of Ceuta, Spain. He arrives to the United States and works with Hispanic emigrants in the ghettos of New York, and travels by canoe in Canada, living in Hudson Bay with the Cree Indians. At 21 years old, he writes his first book and received the First National Award of Psychology, in Spain.

He received scholarship from NYU (Masters) and the Graduate Center of CUNY (PhD), he graduated in Anthropology and Archaeology. His thesis received the First International Orensanz Award in Anthropology. He combines Anthropology and Art becoming a prolific writer. He publishes text books in his twenties and early thirties.

He has had over 100 exhibitions in India, Japan, China, Philippines, Thailand, Indonesia, Malaysia, Hong Kong, Singapore; and, Australia. Over 1,000 private collectors, institutions and museums collect his work in Asia alone. Ginés became a famous artist in Japan; in the last 30 years, he has had over 50 group and solo exhibitions. In the Philippines, he has built the largest monument in the country for Megaworld, at Arcovia City, Manila.

Ginés became a consultant to the United Nations and created in Mexico, in the 1980s, with funds from the United Nations (UNFPA), and the Ford Foundation.

== Honors ==
Ginés has been honored with important international awards and recognitions, including, the Gold Keys of the City of Miami; the Fuji International Art Award, Ueno Metropolitan Museum, Tokyo; the Federico Garcia Lorca Honor Award; the Medal of Kanazawa; the Gold Medal of the Autonomous City of Ceuta; the Ordo Supremus Hierosolymitani, Athens; the Lorenzo de' Medici Medal of the Arts, International Art Fair, Miami; the Keys of the City of Ashland, Kentucky; the Order of San Martino, and he was named “Ambassador of the Arts,” in Rome, for his artistic and humanitarian contributions to the world.
