= Arcovia City =

Mixed-use development in Pasig, Metro Manila, Philippines

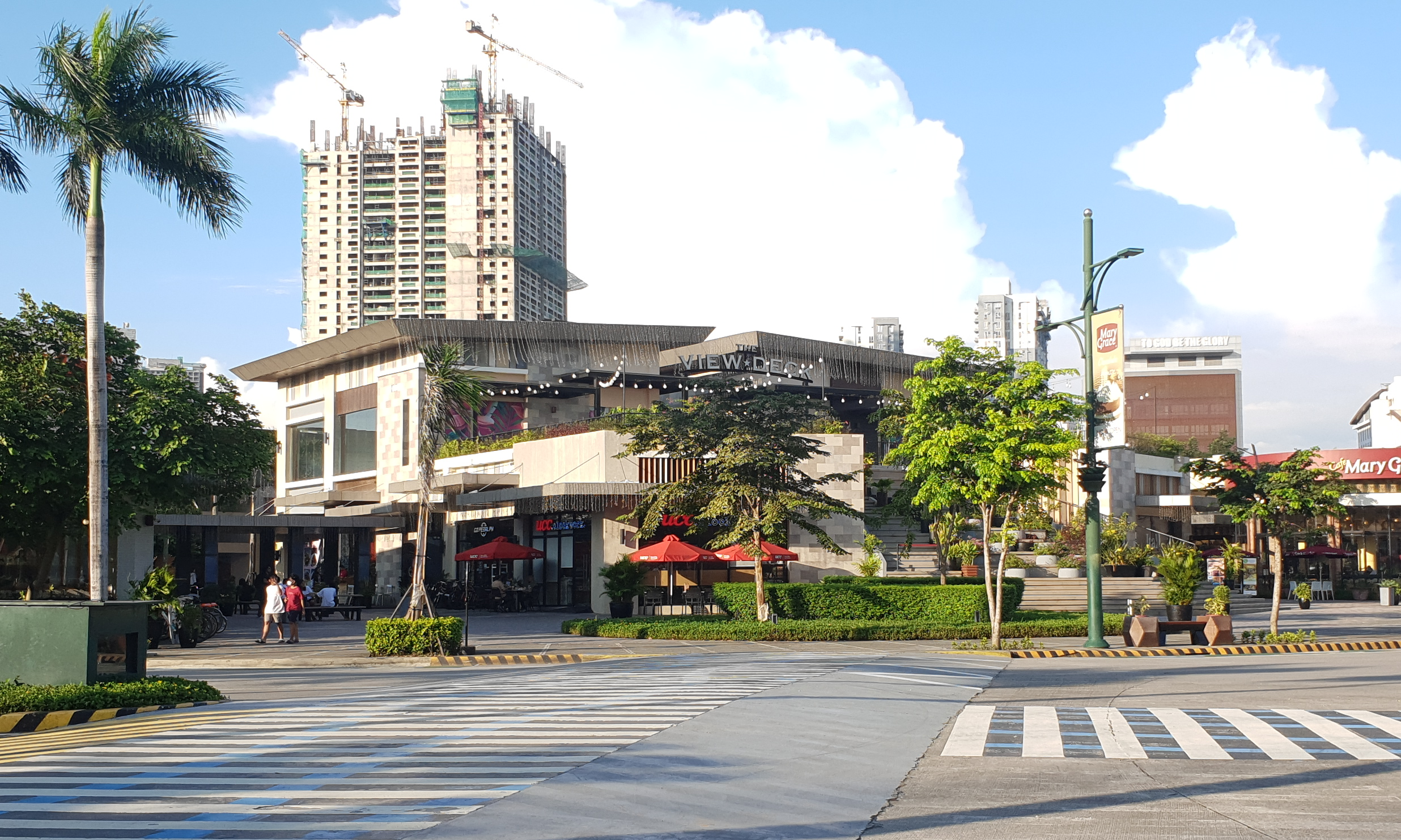
- Arco Parade

Project
- Opening date: 2014; 12 years ago
- Developer: Megaworld Corporation
- Owner: Megaworld Corporation
- Website: Arcovia City

Physical features
- Transport: Arcovia Transport Hub; 16 18 36 39 41 50 56 59 65 Lanuza Avenue; 3 Arcovia City

Location
- Interactive map of Arcovia City
- Coordinates: 14°34′38″N 121°4′33″E
- Country: Philippines
- Location: Ugong, Pasig, Metro Manila, Philippines
- Address: Eulogio Rodriguez Jr. Avenue (C-5 Road)

Arcovia City (sometimes styled ArcoVia City) is a mixed-use development in Ugong, Pasig, Metro Manila, Philippines. The 12.3-hectare (30-acre) riverside township is designated as a cyber park and located by the Marikina River east of Ortigas Center being developed by the Megaworld Corporation.

The centerpiece of the development is a triumphal arch surmounted by a bronze sculpture of a charioteer emperor accompanied by three horses called the Arco de Emperador. When completed, the township will have residential condominiums, a retail hub, LEED-registered office towers and over a thousand trees dotting the mixed-use community making it the greenest urban development by Megaworld to date.

== Location ==
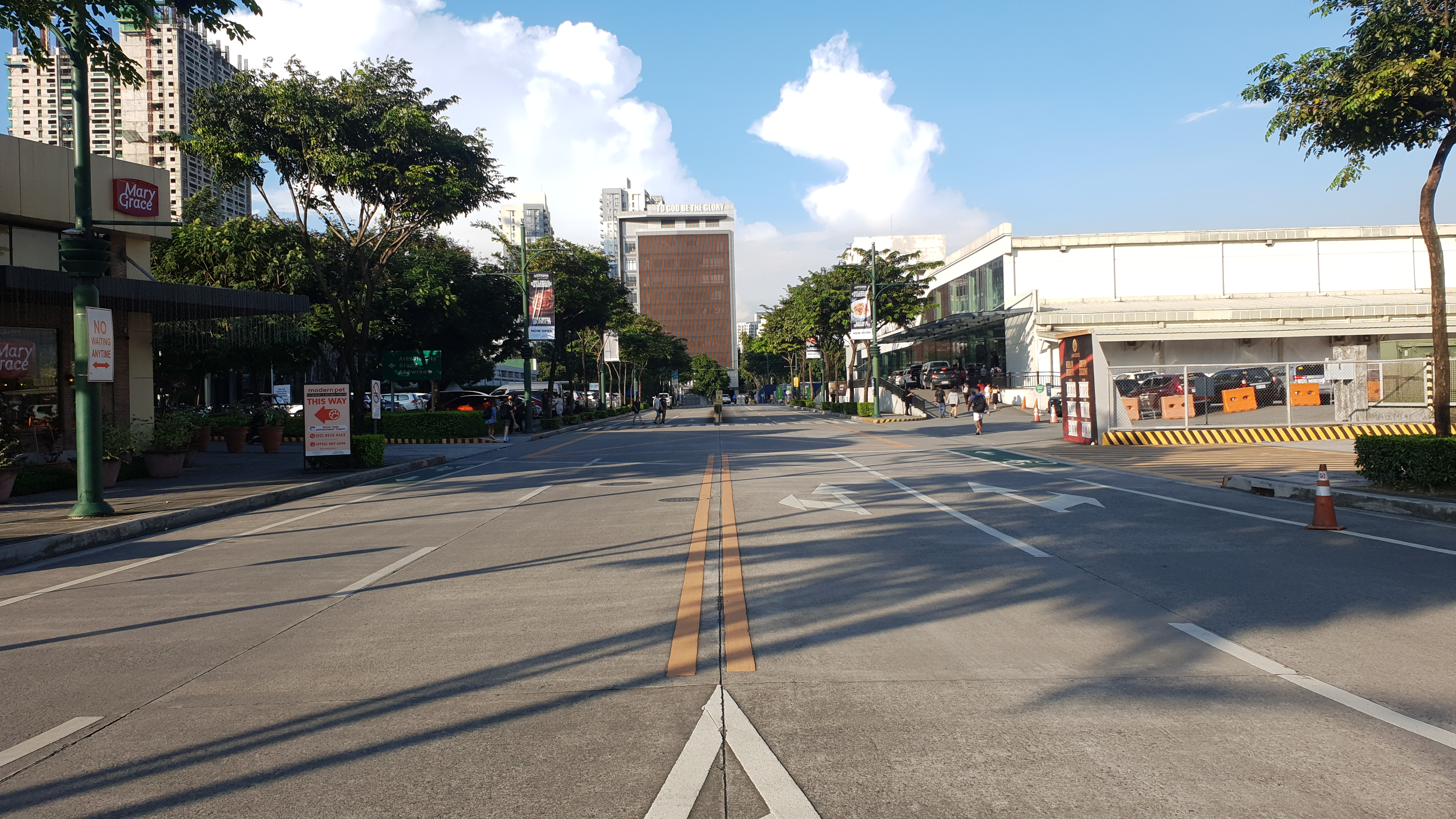
Gran Via Road

Arcovia City is located along Eulogio Rodriguez Jr. Avenue (C-5 Road) in Barangay Ugong, some 3.2 kilometres (2.0 mi) down the same road from Eastwood City, Megaworld's flagship project. It is immediately east of the Valle Verde gated community on the west bank of the Marikina River at Ugong's border with Barangays Rosario and Caniogan. The development is in a former industrial area that has undergone rapid gentrification in recent years. It is flanked by car dealerships (Toyota, Mitsubishi, Subaru and Peugeot). It is connected to the Ortigas Center business district via Lanuza Avenue and Julia Vargas Avenue and is neighbored by other mixed-use communities such as Ortigas East and The Grove by Rockwell to the north. It is also linked to the old city center or poblacion of Pasig (Barangays San Nicolas, Malinao and San Jose) via the 685.04-metre (2,247.5 ft) Kaginhawaan Bridge built in October 2017. The development also has its own bike lane network around the township, as well as bike rental services, making it a popular spot for recreational cycling.

== History ==
The land the development sits on is a former seasoning production plant owned by Ajinomoto Philippines (former Union Ajinomoto Inc.). The Ugong plant had been in operation since 1962 but was closed down in October 2007. The idle factory was then transferred by its owner Leonardo Ty to a real estate affiliate, the Union Ajinomoto Realty Corporation, which was then renamed Woodside Greentown Properties Inc. In August 2013, Megaworld Corporation acquired 100% ownership of the company including its former Ajinomoto plant in Pasig.

The development was announced in March 2014 as Megaworld's seventh township in Metro Manila and ninth in the country. It was initially named Woodside City and was earmarked a budget of ₱35 billion over ten years. Megaworld also announced the company's interest in future acquisitions of surrounding lots for possible expansion of the township. The development was renamed as Arcovia City in September 2015. In February 2019, the Arco de Emperador, an iconic archway representing the Filipinos' aspirations for success was unveiled to welcome visitors to the new township. The township won Best Mixed-Use Development in the 2019 Philippine Property Awards.

On September 7, 2022, Megaworld and the Bicol Isarog Transport System inaugurated a transportation hub inside of the Arcovia township. Through the transportation hub, Bicol Isarog plies daily night passenger routes and cargo services between Arcovia and the cities of Naga and Albay and the municipality of Nabua in the Bicol Region.

On April 1, 2024, President Bongbong Marcos issued Proclamation No. 512, designating 123,837 sq.m. parcels of land, along E. Rodriguez Jr. Avenue in Ugong, Pasig, as a Special Economic Zone (Information Technology Park), as Arcovia City pursuant to Republic Act No. 7916, or the “Special Economic Zone Act of 1995,” as amended by RA No. 8748, and upon recommendation of the Philippine Economic Zone Authority.

Starting September 10, 2026, the development will also be served by the electric Love Bus service's Robinsons Galleria - Eastwood route.

== Developments ==
Arcovia City houses the following developments , in different stages of planning and construction:

=== Arco de Emperador ===
Arco de Emperador

The Arco de Emperador is a 23-metre (75 ft) high neoclassical monument arch that serves as the iconic landmark of the Arcovia City township. It is the Philippines' tallest monument and one of the first triumphal arches in the country that was completed in February 2019. The archway was designed by Spanish sculptor Ginés Serrán-Pagán in 2013 who started work on the bronze sculptures in 2015. It was patterned after the Arco de la Victoria in Madrid, Spain.

The iconic landmark takes its name from both the sister company of the developer, Emperador brandy, and the Spanish and Filipino word for "emperor." It stands on a traffic circle in the middle of the township and consists of bronze sculptures of a fictitious Filipino emperador on a chariot drawn by three horses perched on top of the archway. The chariot is flanked by two bronze lions and two 24-karat gold angels blowing trumpets. The sculptural group forms a pyramid composition and is said to symbolize power, strength, passion and self-made success of ordinary Filipinos.

Arco de Emperador is surrounded by a landscaped plaza with water features and benches. A museum is also planned for the basement of the archway.

=== Arcovia Parade ===
Arcovia Parade is the retail component of the Arcovia City development which opened in early 2019. It is a dining strip that houses the first Popeyes branch in the Philippines since it closed in 2007, a branch of Cebu-based Seafood City, McDonald's, Starbucks and a Landers Superstore.

=== Office developments ===
==== One Paseo ====
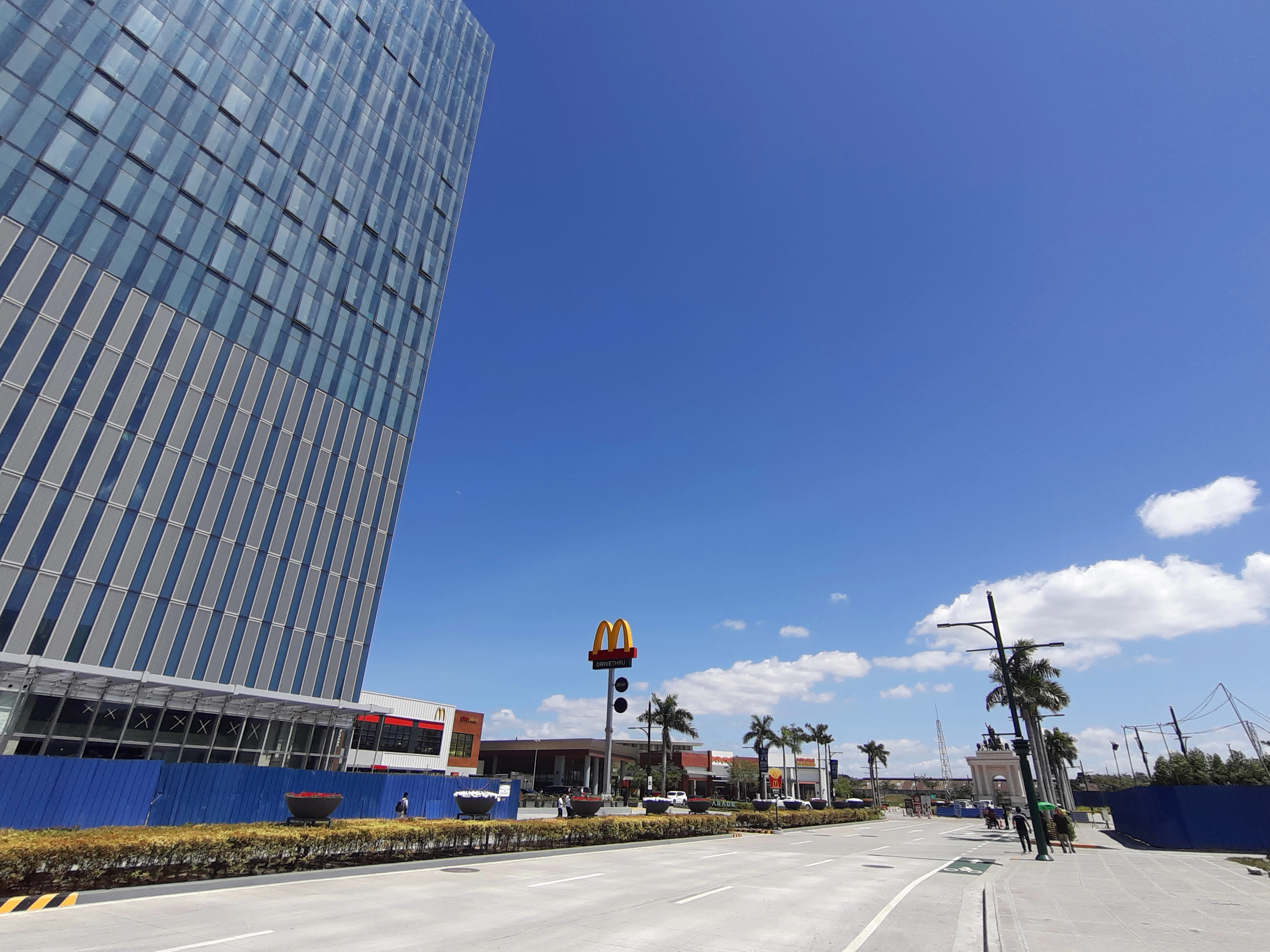
One Paseo under construction, March 2020

One Paseo is Arcovia's first office tower development. It is 17 floors high and has a total leasable office space of 23,000 square metres (250,000 sq ft). The development began construction in 2018 and was completed the following year. It was designed by Skidmore, Owings and Merrill.

=== Residential developments ===
==== 18 Avenue de Triomphe ====
The first residential tower in Arcovia City is a 37-storey condominium building with 576 units named 18 Avenue de Triomphe. The ₱4 billion development was launched in 2018. It was completed in 2025.

==== Arcovia Palazzo ====
The second residential development in Arcovia will feature two condominium towers, namely the 40-storey Altea Tower, and the 45-storey Benissa Tower. Designed by UK-based architectural firm Broadway Malyan, it will have a total of 1,472 units and is expected to be completed in late 2026.

==== Arcovia Park Place ====
The third residential development is Arcovia Park Place. Formerly known as the Cantabria Tower of Arcovia Palazzo, the 50-storey tower is set to become the tallest structure in the entire development. It will offer 494 units and is expected to be completed around 2029.

=== Hotel developments ===
==== Arcovia Hotel ====
Set to be Megaworld's tallest hotel development, the Arcovia Hotel will feature 339 hotel suites offering views of Metro Manila and the mountains of Antipolo. It is projected to open in 2029.

== Gallery ==
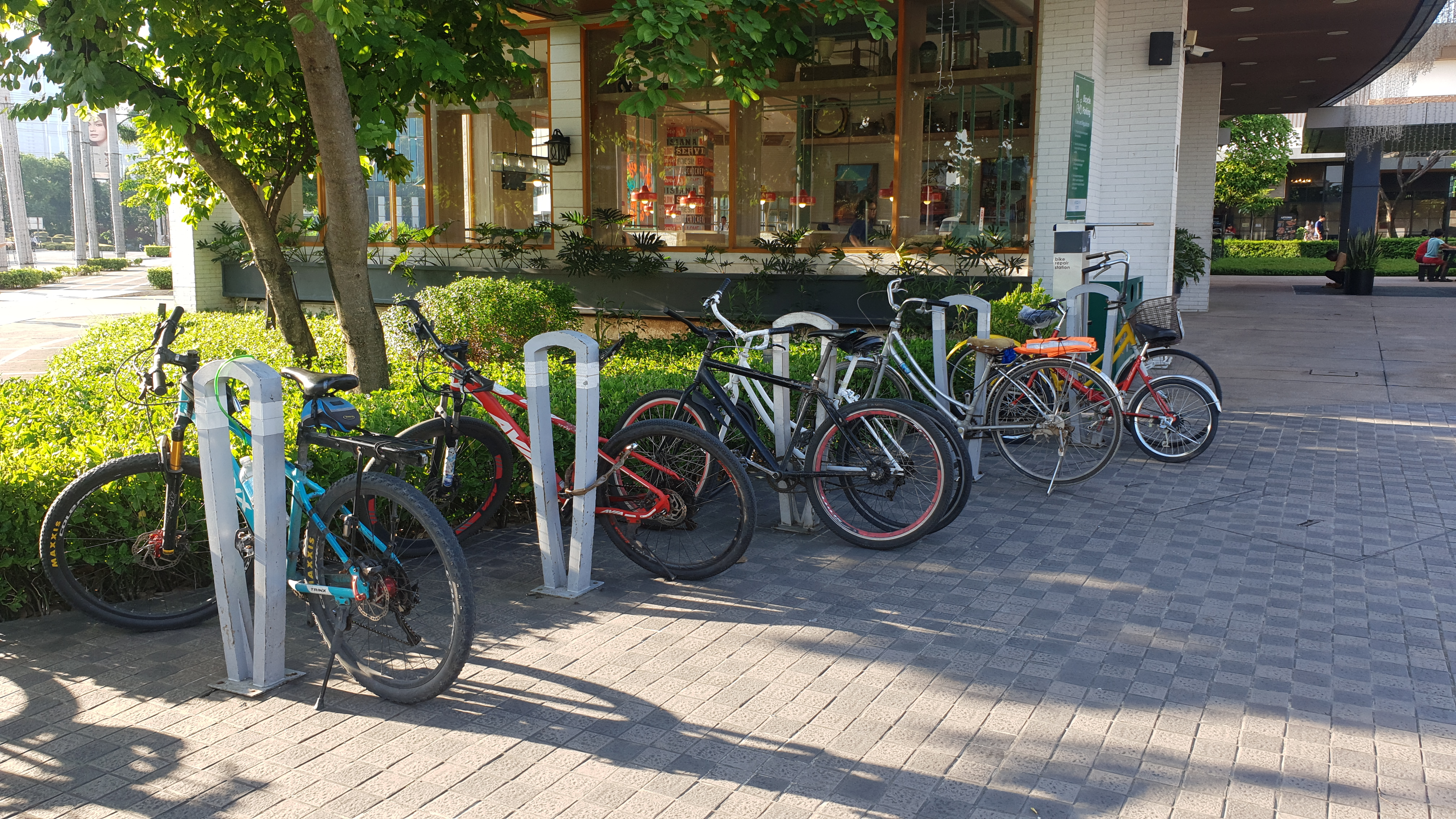
Bicycle racks at the Arco Parade

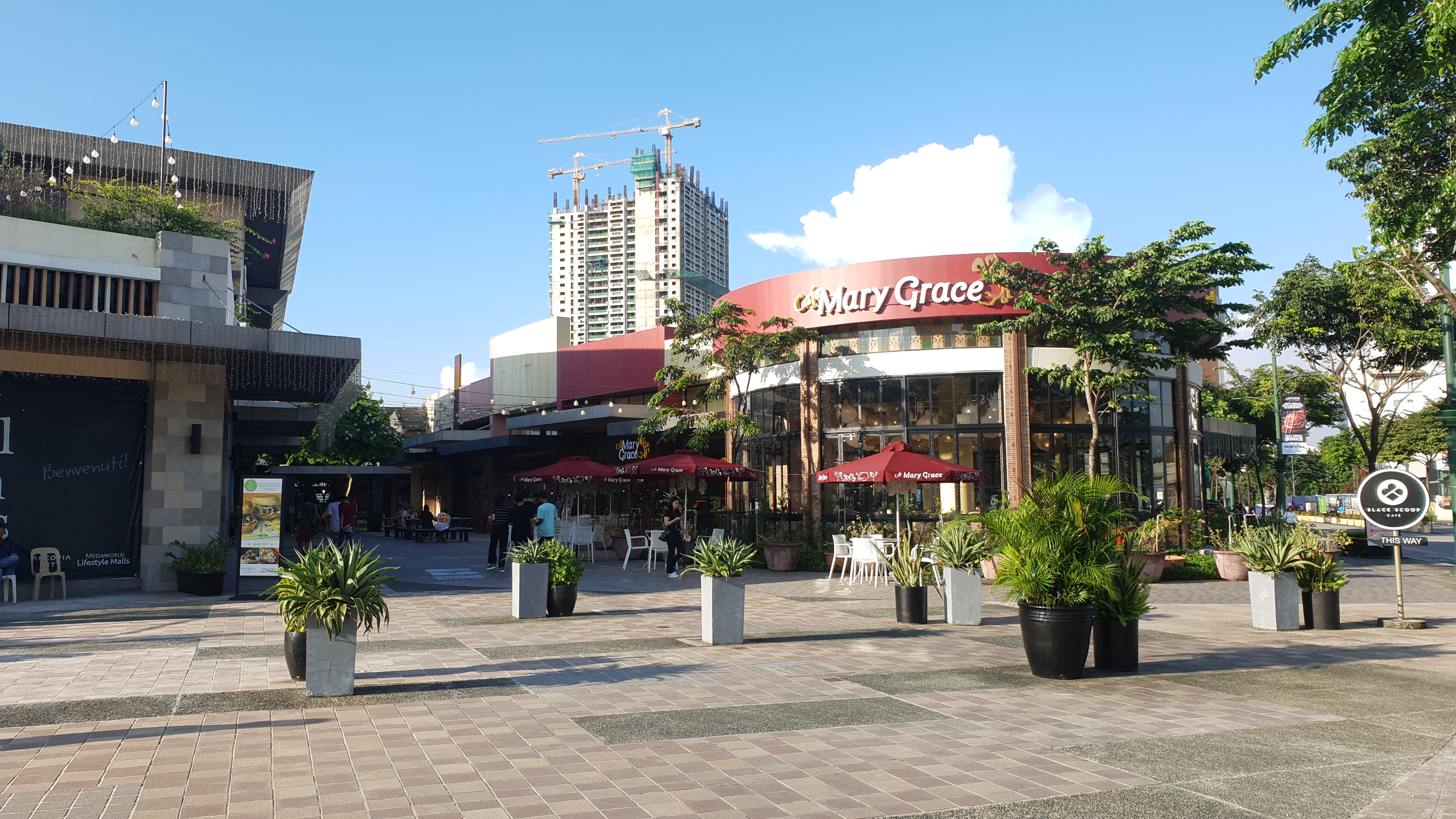
Mary Grace Cafe branch

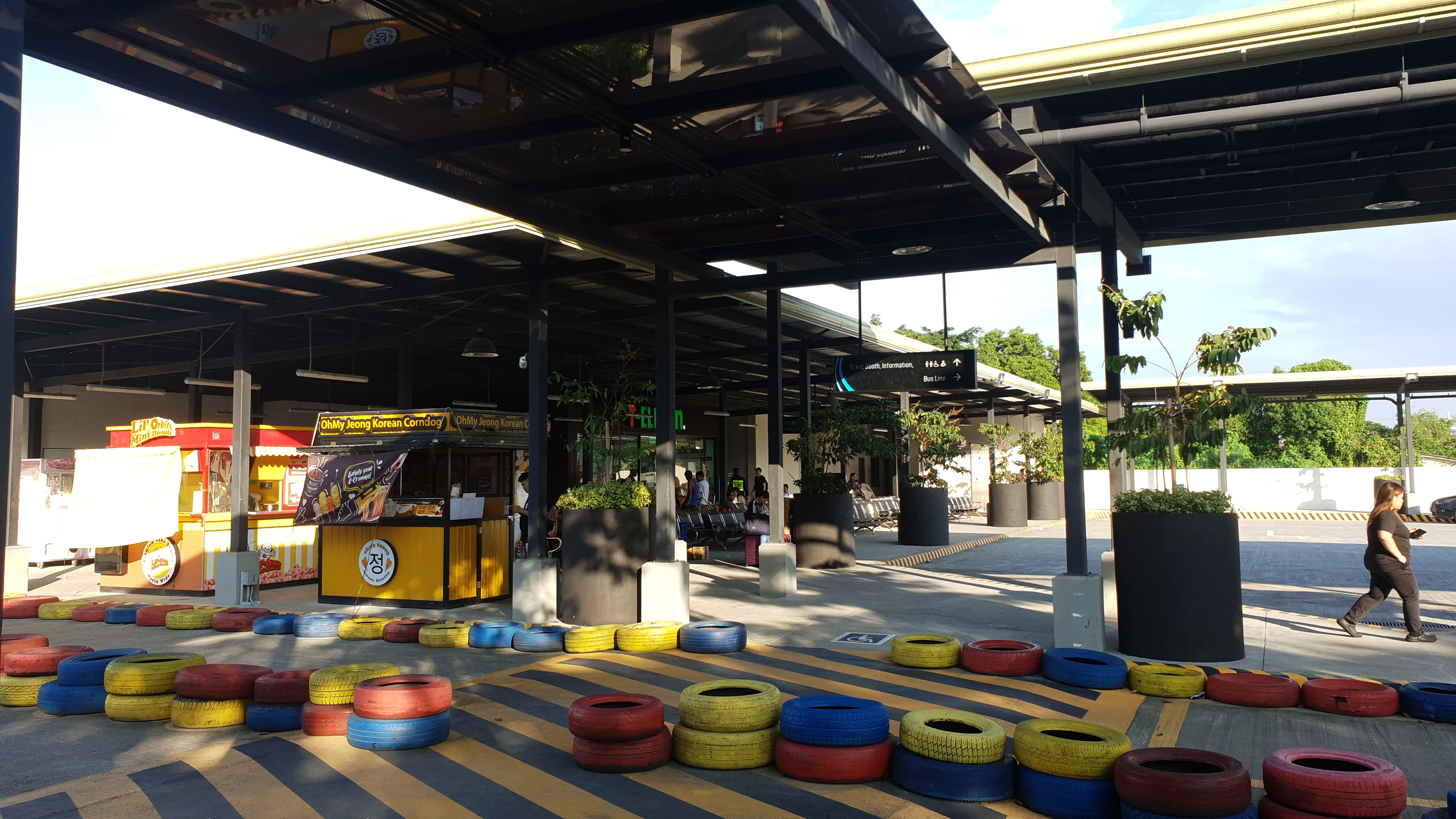
Arcovia Transport Hub bus terminal and go-kart track

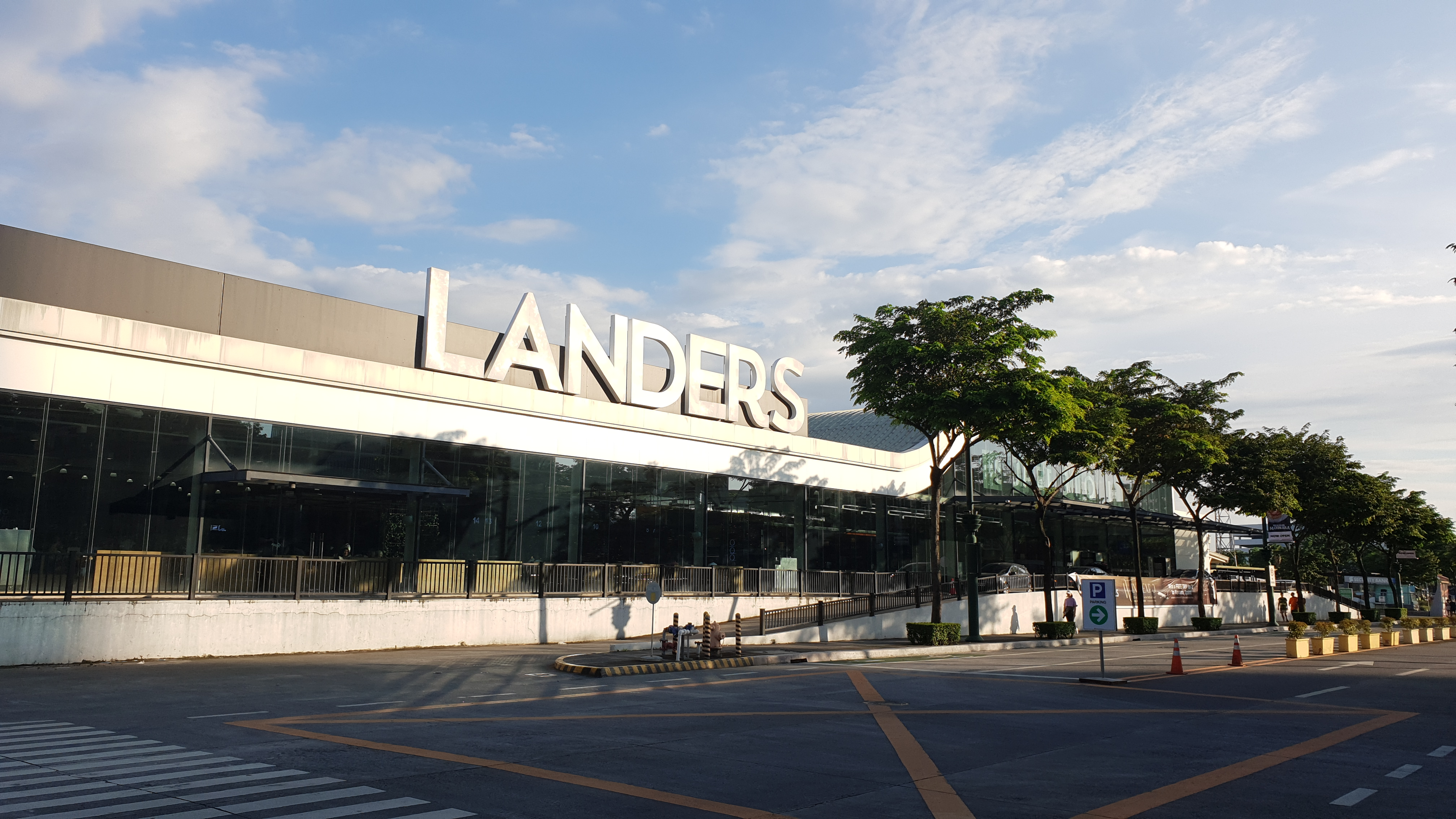
Landers Superstore

== Incidents ==
- On March 13, 2024, the Landers Arcovia branch caught fire, reaching second alarm. The store was temporarily closed following the incident.
