= Ugong Pasig National High School =

Public high school in Pasig, Philippines

- Pambansang Mataas na Paaralan ng Ugong Pasig (Filipino)

Location
- 129 F. Legaspi Street, Barangay Ugong; Pasig, Metro Manila; Philippines
- Coordinates: 14°34′46″N 121°04′44″E

Information
- School type: National high school
- Educational authority: Department of Education
- School code: 340655
- Principal: Junie C. Serot
- Language: English and Filipino

Ugong Pasig National High School (abbreviated as UPNHS; Filipino: Pambansang Mataas na Paaralan ng Ugong Pasig) is a national high school in Ugong, Pasig, in the Philippines. It was established through the enactment Republic Act No. 10464 on April 16, 2013.
