= Eastwood City =

Business district in Quezon City, Philippines

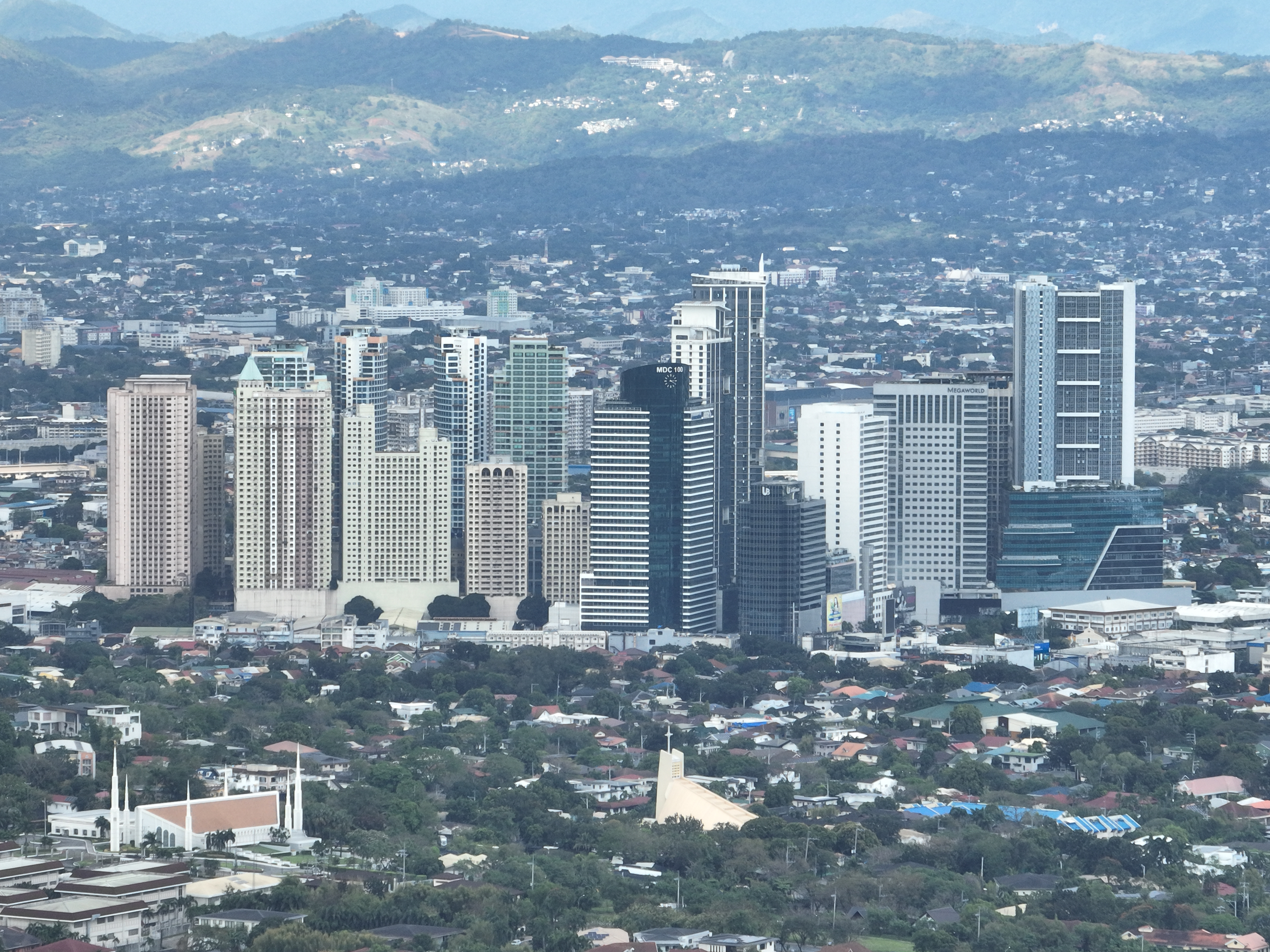
- Drone shot of Eastwood City (2026)

Project
- Opening date: 1997; 29 years ago
- Developer: Megaworld Corporation
- Owner: Megaworld Corporation
- Website: http://www.eastwoodcity.com

Physical features
- Major buildings: Eastwood Mall, Eastwood Citywalk I and II, Eastwood Cyber and Fashion Mall, 19 high-rise residential towers
- Public spaces: Eastwood Mall Open Park
- Transport: Express bus services 19 Calle Industria; 19 Eastwood City; 3 Eastwood City

Location
- Interactive map of Eastwood City
- Coordinates: 14°36′34.8912″N 121°4′48.306″E
- Location: Eulogio Rodriguez Jr. Avenue (C-5), Bagumbayan, Quezon City 1110, Metro Manila, Philippines

Eastwood City is an 18.5-hectare (46-acre) mixed-use development complex located in Barangay Bagumbayan, Quezon City. Launched in 1997, it is Megaworld Corporation’s first “live-work-play” community that is known to offer complete facilities, amenities, and establishments for living, working, entertainment, and shopping.

It is home to the largest business process outsourcing (BPO) locators, Eastwood City is the country’s first IT park and the first project to be granted special economic zone status by the Philippine Economic Zone Authority (PEZA). Since its establishment as a premier Cyberpark, it has become a top employer and leading dollar-earner in the Philippines. Apart from being a business community, Eastwood City is also a residential community with 19 high-rise residential towers. Eastwood is also an Accredited Tourism Entertainment Complex by the Department of Tourism. Eastwood City has been considered to offer families, professionals and urbanites a variety of shopping, dining and recreation offerings at its three lifestyle malls, Eastwood Mall, Eastwood Cyber and Fashion Mall, and Eastwood Citywalk, all of which are managed under the Megaworld Lifestyle Malls brand.

== Features ==
=== Eastwood Mall ===
Eastwood Mall

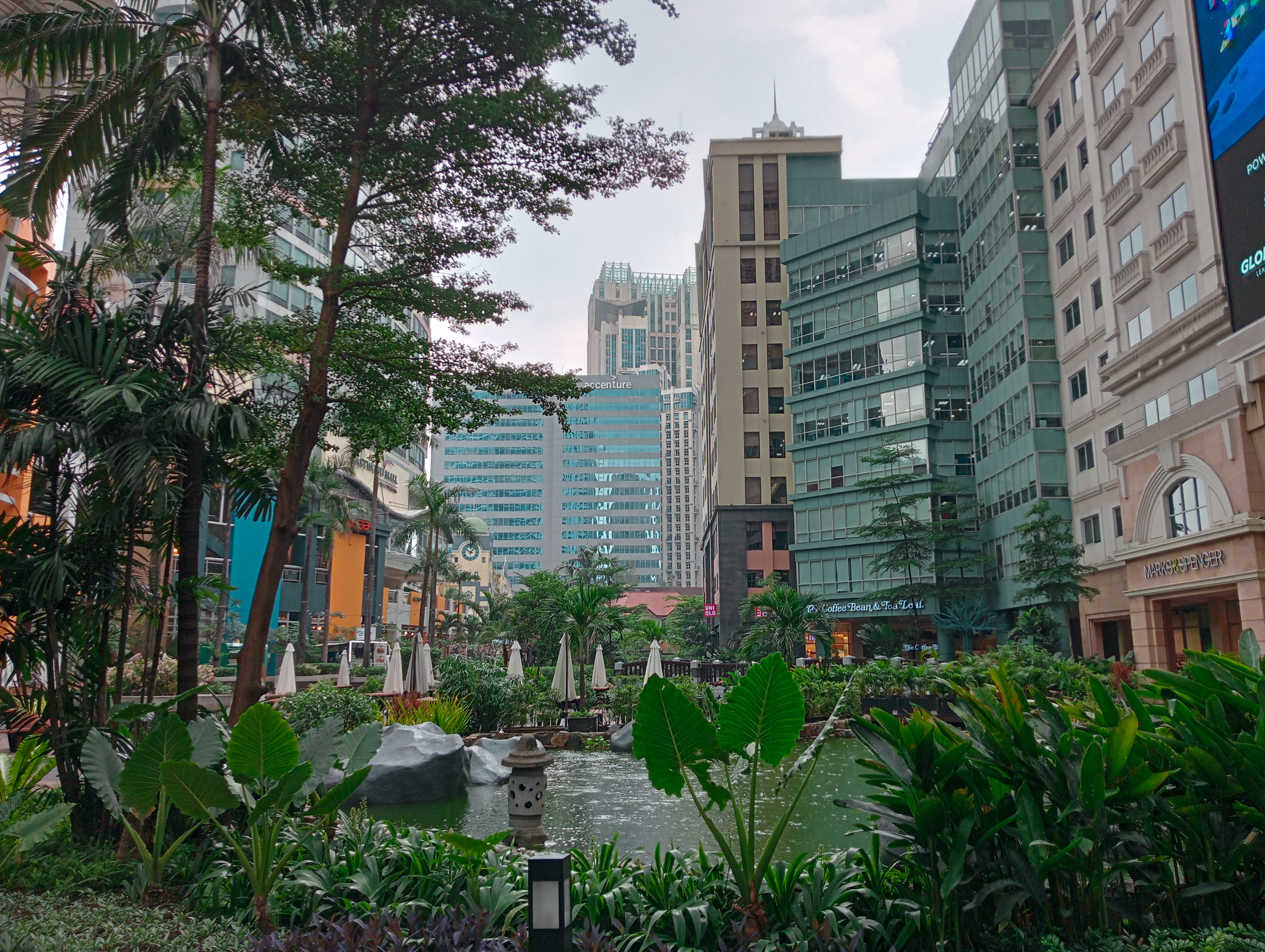
Eastwood City Open Park

Eastwood Mall is a four-level mall opened in December 2008 that houses restaurants as well as cinemas. The mall also houses 47,000 m^{2} (510,000 sq ft) of retail spaces.

The mall also has an open space, the Eastwood Mall Open Park, which has a lagoon and a fountain. This venue is used for large community events such as the annual New Year’s Eve countdown. (Note: The Eastwood City New Year Countdown is a premier annual celebration in the Philippines, famous for its signature "Star Drop" tradition inspired by New York’s Times Square ball drop. Every December 31st at the Eastwood Mall Open Park, a massive, illuminated star descends to mark the final seconds of the year, culminating in a spectacular midnight fireworks display. The long-running event regularly draws massive crowds with a vibrant festival atmosphere, featuring star-studded concert lineups of top Filipino artists, interactive light installations, and high-energy countdown parties to welcome the new year.)

Eastwood Mall also houses four cinemas.

It is also the first shopping center in the Philippines to welcome pets and was inducted into the Order of the Platinum Paw by the Philippine Animal Welfare Society (PAWS).

=== Eastwood Citywalk I and II ===
Eastwood City Walk, opened in early 2000, is a combination of two dining strips that offers restaurants, nightlife bars, and a variety of retail stores. Eastwood Citywalk also has an outdoor area called the Eastwood Central Plaza, which regularly hosts live performances, fairs, pet activities and other outdoor events.

It also features the Eastwood City Walk of Fame which is directly inspired by the Hollywood Walk of Fame in California, US. This landmark was launched by the late Filipino entertainment icon ‘Master Showman’ German Moreno as a tribute to the men and women from the Philippine entertainment industry.

=== Eastwood Cyber and Fashion Mall ===
Eastwood Cyber and Fashion Mall houses establishments including fashion stores, book stores, beauty and wellness and more. The mall is also home to many dining establishments for employees, residents and patrons of Eastwood City.

=== Eastwood City Cyberpark ===
The Eastwood City Cyberpark is a PEZA certified business center housing major IT companies such as Atos, Accenture, Dell, eTelecare, IBM Global Services, MicroSourcing, WNS Global Services, and other BPO companies occupying its office buildings throughout the complex.

The offices and studios for the Philippine subsidiary of Toei Animation are also located in the Cyberpark.

== Gallery ==
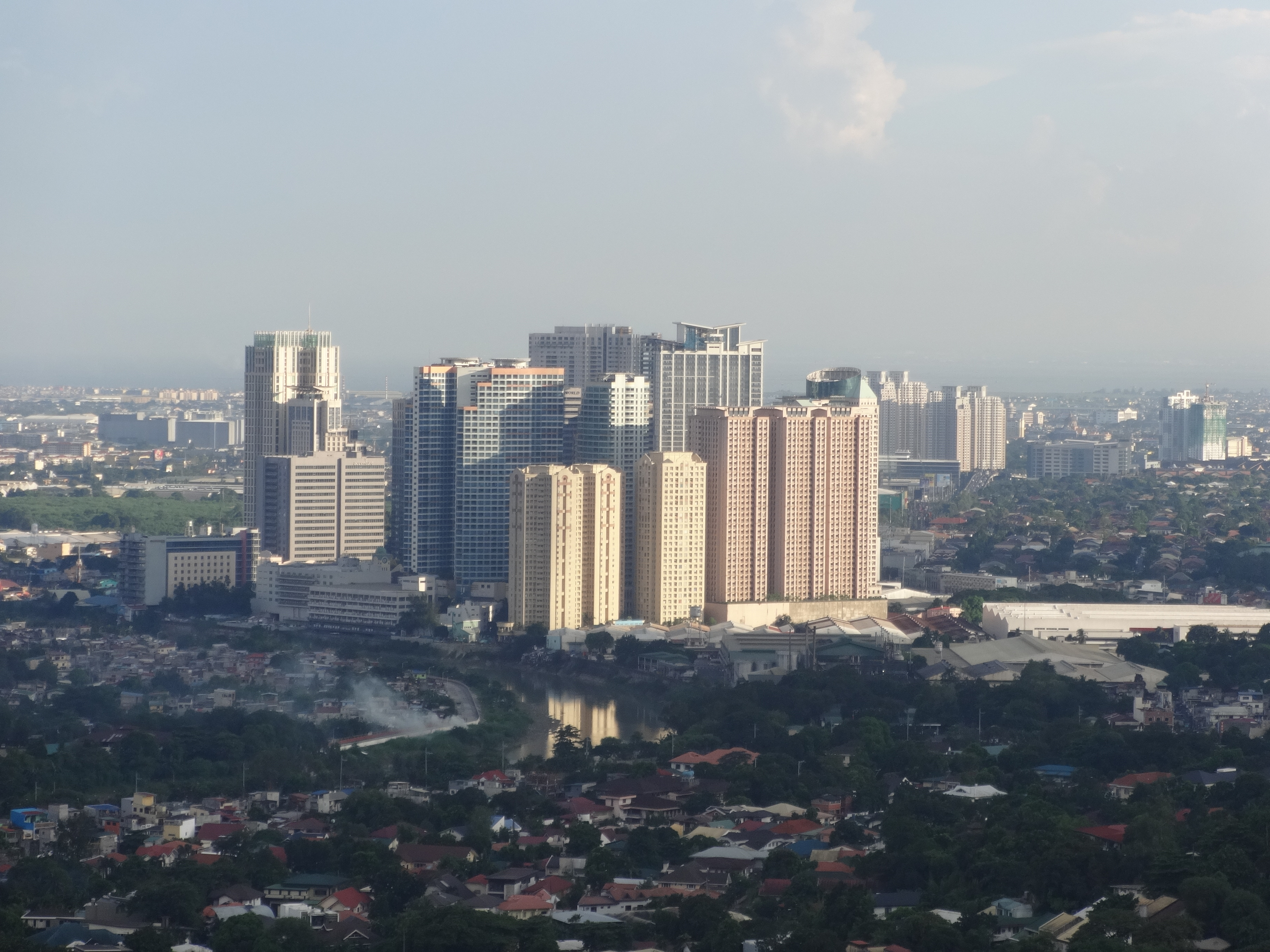
Eastwood skyline

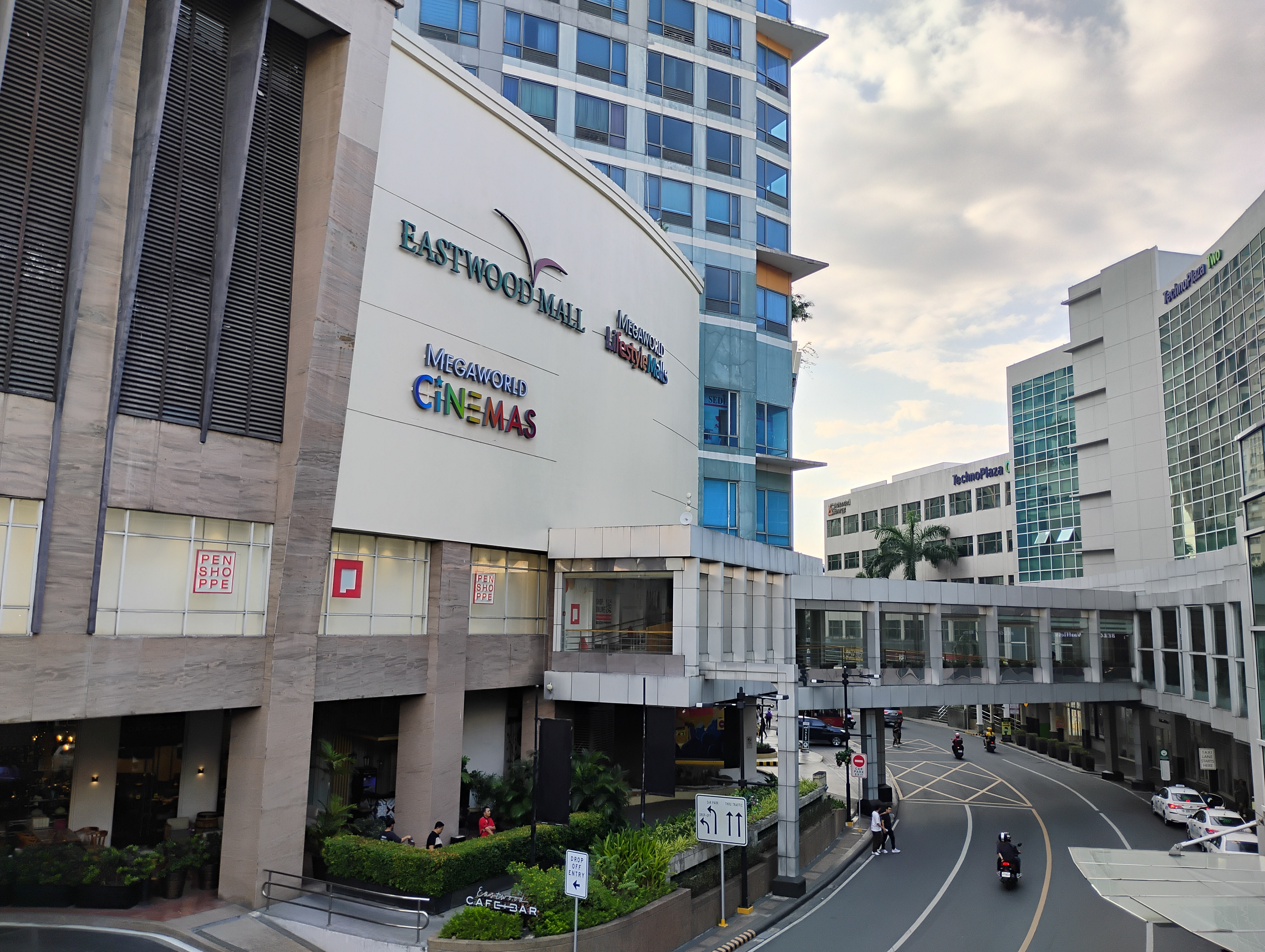
Eastwood Mall along Orchard Road

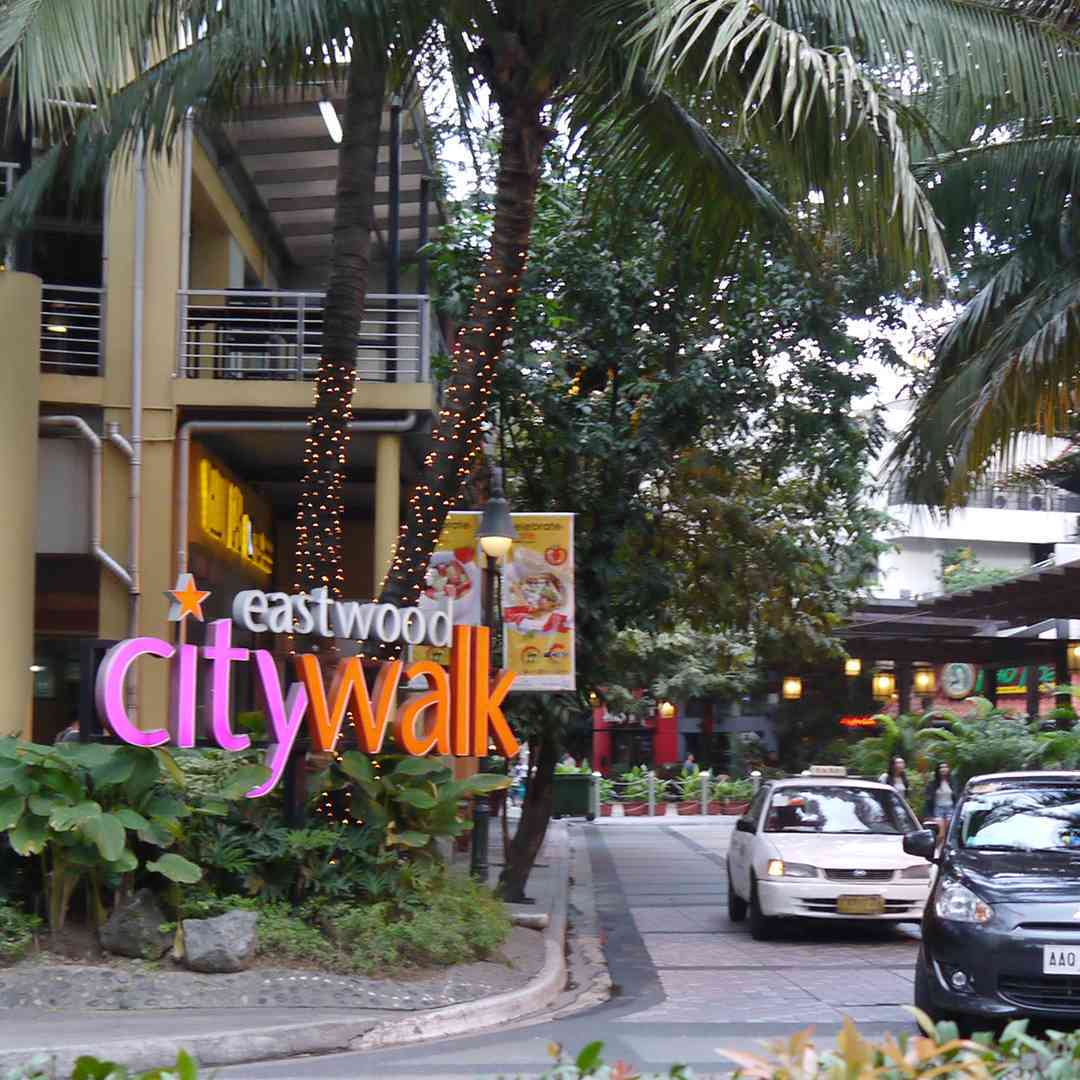
Eastwood City Walk Landmark

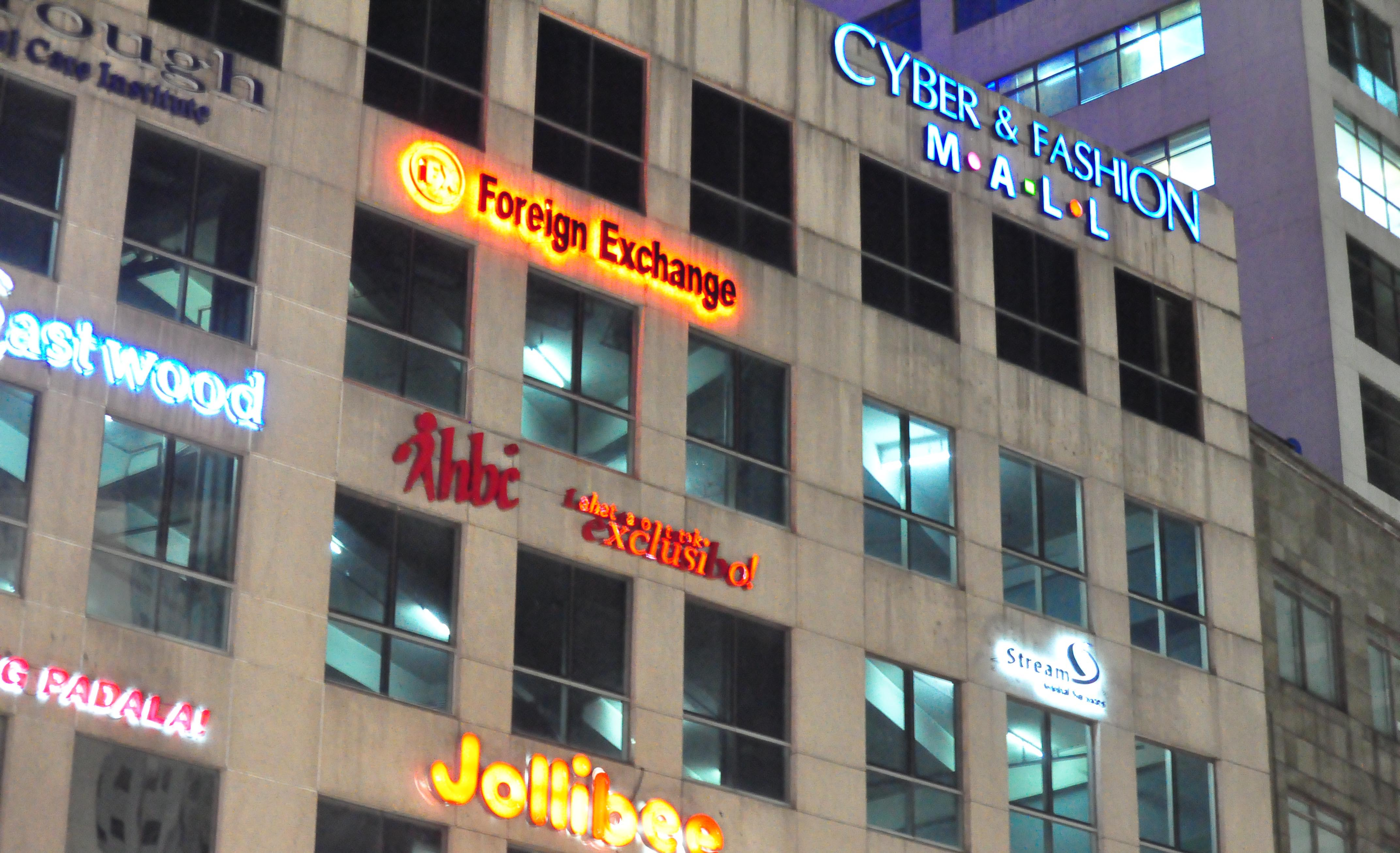
Eastwood Cyberfashion Mall

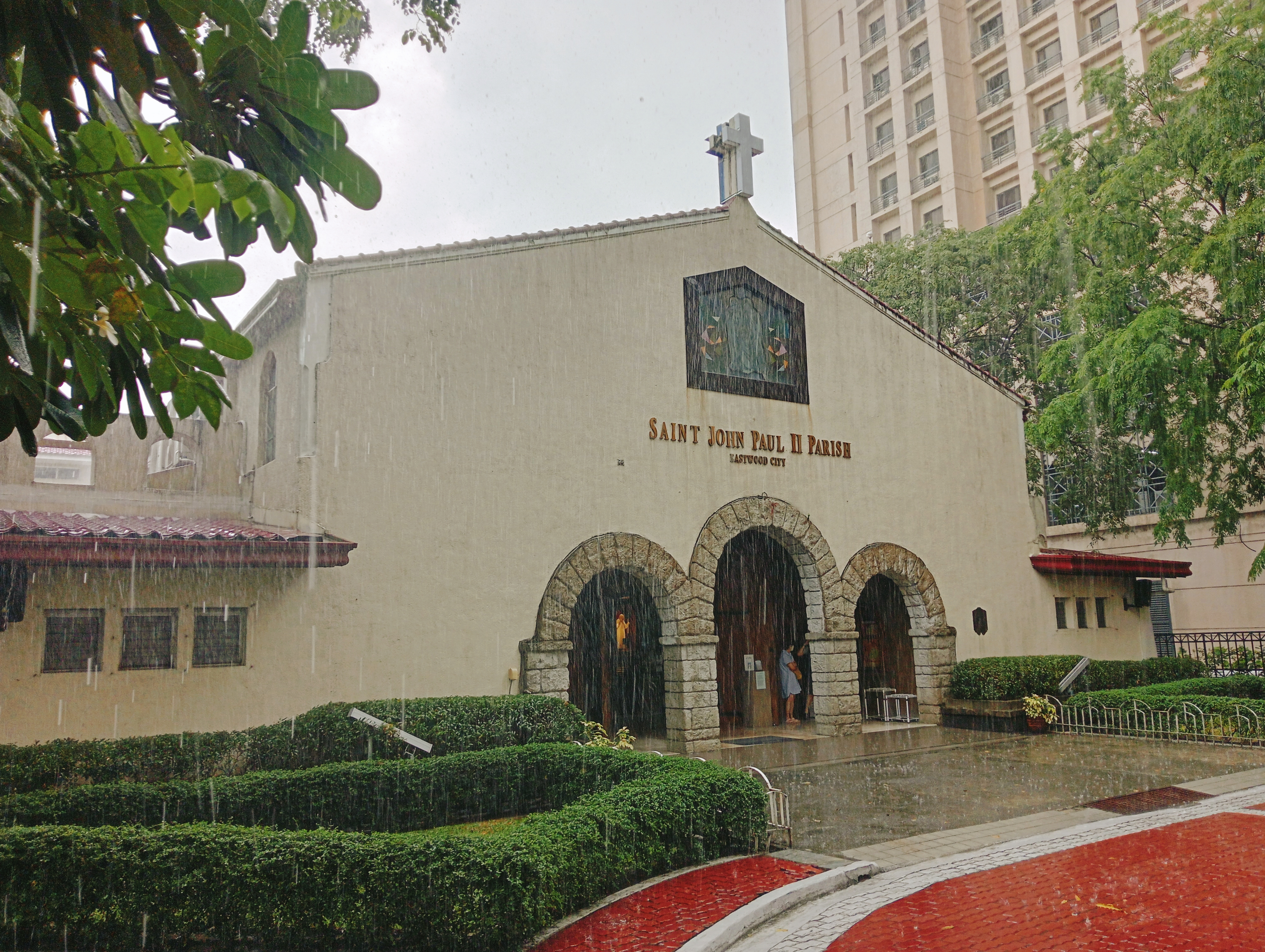
St. John Paul II Parish

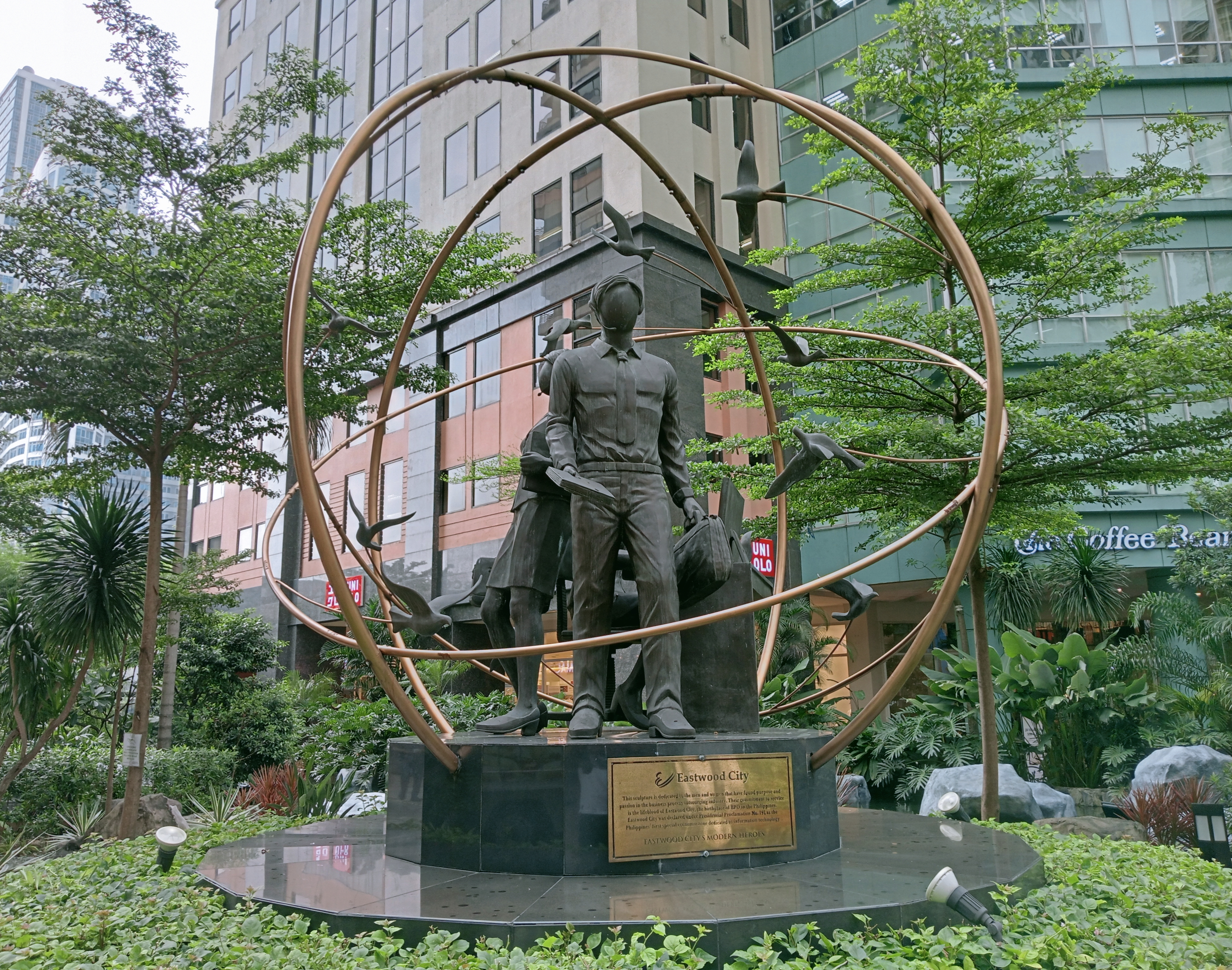
Eastwood City's Modern Heroes Monument

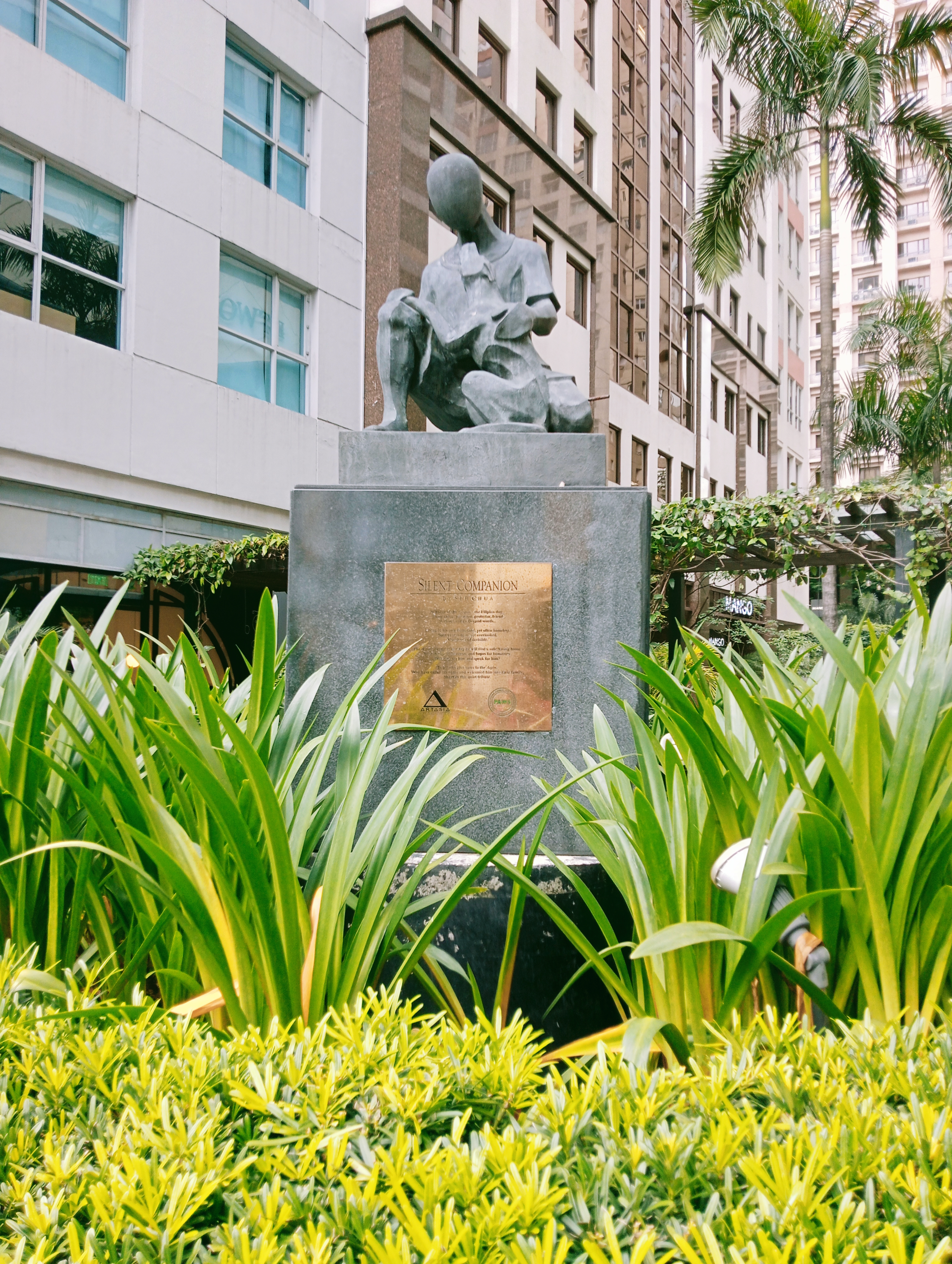
Silent Companion Monument
