= Ugong, Pasig =

Barangay in Pasig, Metro Manila, Philippines

Barangay Ugong Hugong
- Barangay
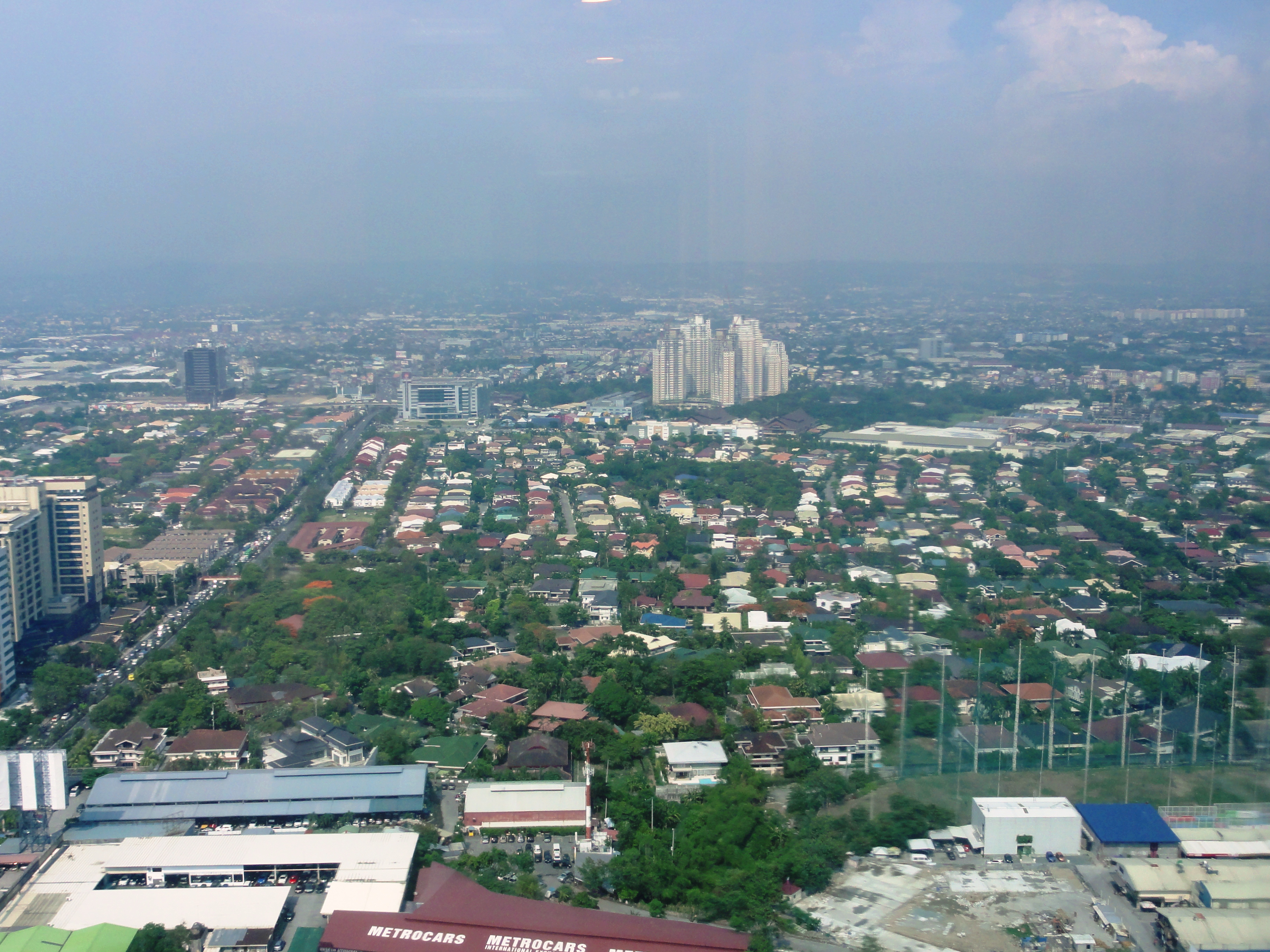
- Aerial view of Barangay Ugong
- Nickname: Ugong
- Motto: Bayanihan
- Ugong
- Coordinates: 14.5842°N 121.0729°E
- Country: Philippines
- Region: Metro Manila
- City: Pasig
- District: 1st district of Pasig

Government
  - Type: Barangay
  - Barangay Captain: Gloria P. Cruz

Area
  - Total: 5,931.6 km^{2} (2,290.2 sq mi)
  - Land: 375.38 km^{2} (144.94 sq mi)

Population (2024)
  - Total: 31,627
- Demonym: Taga-Ugong
- Time zone: UTC+8 (Philippine Standard Time)
- Postal code: 1604
- Range: Marikina Valley Fault Ridge

Ugong is a highly urbanized barangay located in the northwestern portion of Pasig. Today, barangay Ugong is further subdivided into south which is part of Pasig, while the northern boundary of Ugong, Ugong Norte, is under Quezon City. It is also the location of Arcovia City, which was designated as a Special Economic Zone (Information Technology Park) in 2024.

The barangay was also part of Mandaluyong when it was included in the 1940s consolidation under the City of Greater Manila.

== Education ==
- Francisco Legaspi Memorial School
- St. Paul College Pasig
- Reedley International School
- Domuschola International School
- Ugong Pasig National High School

== Attractions ==
- Arcovia City
- Silver City
- SM Center Pasig
- Tiendesitas
- The Grove by Rockwell
- Metrowalk

== Gallery ==
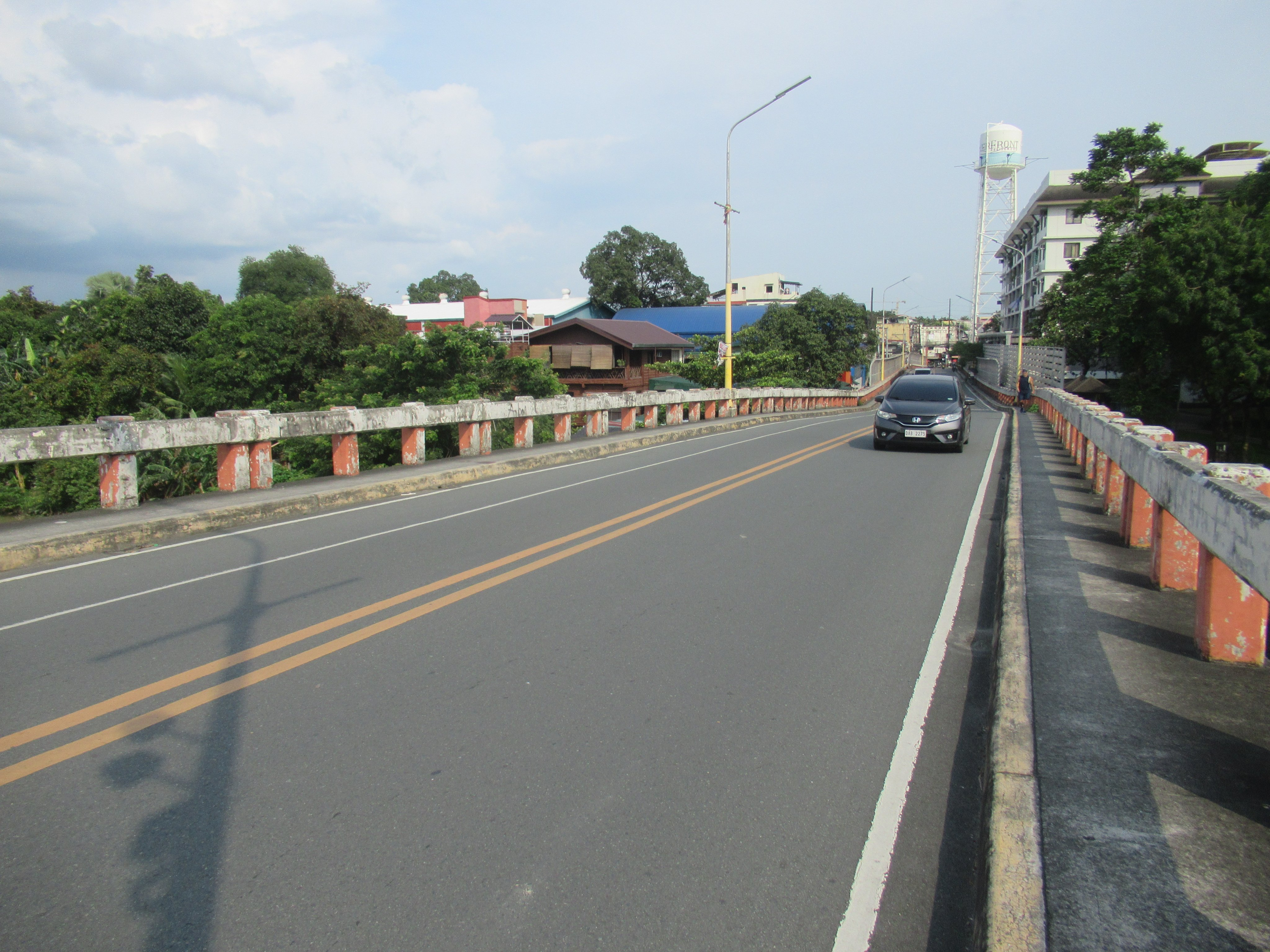
Caruncho (Manalo) also named as Kaginhawaan Bridge
