= ETelecare =

Philippine business process outsourcing company

eTelecare Global Solutions, Inc.
- Company type: Public
- Industry: Business process outsourcing, Offshoring
- Founder: Jim Franke and Derek Holley
- Headquarters: Quezon City, Metro Manila, Philippines
- Key people: John Harris, Rick Felix and Gilbert Hernandez (Director, President & CEO)
- Number of employees: 13,400+ (2008)
- Website: eTelecare homepage

eTelecare Global Solutions, Inc (Nasdaq: ETEL) (PSE:ETEL), was a provider of complex business process outsourcing (BPO).

eTelecare Global Solutions provides outsourced service through voice, email, and chat for companies in such industries such as consumer electronics, telecommunications, financial services, travel, and media. It offers customer service, technical support, sales, and market research services from contact centers in the Philippines, United States, Nicaragua, and South Africa.

== History ==
eTelecare was founded as eTelecare International in November 1999 by Jim Franke and Derek Holley] two alumni of the call center consultancy of McKinsey & Company. It calls itself the first Filipino Call Center. Over time more offices were added. It provides business process outsourcing (BPO) services focusing on the complex, voice and non-voice based segment of customer care services. The company provides a range of services, including technical support, customer service, sales, customer retention, chat and email from both onshore and offshore locations.

eTelecare's first call center went live with inbound telecommunications and financial services programs in September 2000. The company collaborated with Avaya and Cisco Systems to incorporate compression technologies across traditional T-1 circuits. This helped eTelecare International to cut its telecommunication costs by a factor of ten and allowed it to save needed capital in order to rapidly expand. eTelecare was the first outsource organization to do this and as a result gained competitive advantage albeit brief over its competition.

In May 2004, Phase 2 Solutions was acquired by eTelecare International. Phase 2 Solutions was the 8th largest independent wireless reseller in the US.
By February 2005, eTelecare International became known as eTelecare Global Solutions. In December 2008, Ayala Corporation and Providence Equity Partners acquired all of the outstanding shares of eTelecare in the Philippines and all of the outstanding eTelecare American Depositary Shares in the United States

By October 2009, Stream Global Services acquired EGS Corp., the indirect parent company of eTelecare Global Solutions in a stock-for-stock exchange. It became known as Stream International Global Services Philippines, Inc.
