= Legislative district of Las Piñas–Muntinlupa =

Former legislative district of the Philippines

The Legislative district of Las Piñas–Muntinlupa was the combined representation of the Metropolitan Manila municipalities (now highly urbanized cities) of Las Piñas and Muntinlupa in the lower house of the Congress of the Philippines from 1987 to 1998.

Since 1998, each has been represented separately through the lone congressional districts of Las Piñas and Muntinlupa.

== History ==
Prior to gaining joint representation, Las Piñas and Muntinlupa were represented under Manila province (1898–1899), Rizal (1907–1972), Region IV (1978–1984), and the parliamentary districts of Las Piñas–Parañaque and Taguig–Pateros–Muntinlupa (1984–1986).

Under the new Constitution which was proclaimed on 11 February 1987, the independent Metro Manila municipalities of Las Piñas and Muntinlupa constituted a single congressional district, and elected its member to the restored House of Representatives starting that same year.

The enactment of Republic Act No. 7926 and its subsequent approval by plebiscite on 8 May 1995 converted Muntinlupa into a highly urbanized city. Per Section 62 of R.A. 7926 Muntinlupa and Las Piñas were to constitute separate congressional districts, with each district electing its separate representative in the 1998 elections. This separation was additionally confirmed in the city charter of Las Piñas (R.A. 8251) which was approved by plebiscite on 26 March 1997.

== Lone District (defunct) ==
- Municipalities: Las Piñas (became highly urbanized city 1997), Muntinlupa (became highly urbanized city 1995)

Period	Representative
8th Congress; 1987–1992	Filemon C. Aguilar
9th Congress; 1992–1995	Manuel B. Villar, Jr.
10th Congress; 1995–1998	Manuel B. Villar, Jr.

== See also ==
- Legislative districts of Rizal
- Legislative district of Las Piñas-Parañaque
- Legislative district of Taguig-Pateros-Muntinlupa
- Legislative district of Las Piñas
- Legislative district of Muntinlupa
