= List of senators of the Philippines in the 20th Congress by seniority =

This is a complete list of senators of the Philippines during the 20th Congress of the Philippines listed by seniority from June 30, 2025.

The criteria for seniority used in this article are derived from the cumulative length of service of a member of the Senate prior to the current Congress. Although an official roster ranking senators by seniority is not publicly available, their total cumulative years of service have been used to determine seniority. It has long been customary, following the practice of the United States Senate, to elect the most senior senator as either president of the Senate or president pro tempore, although this practice has become less common in the modern Senate. Furthermore, seniority is traditionally considered in the selection of chairpersons of major Senate committees.

In cases where senators have equal cumulative service, seniority is determined by the following criteria, in order:

- Longest uninterrupted period of service
- Earlier date on which the cumulative length of service was achieved
- Alphabetical order of surnames

In this Congress, Tito Sotto is the most senior senator, having previously served 24 years in Senate, while Camille Villar is the most junior senator.

== List of senators by seniority ==
| Rank | Senator | Party | Length of previous tenures (Dates of previous tenures) | Notes |
|---|---|---|---|---|
| 1 | Tito Sotto | NPC | 24 years, 0 days (June 30, 1992 – June 30, 2004; June 30, 2010 – June 30, 2022) | Senate president (September 8, 2025 – May 11, 2026); Senate president pro tempore (from June 17, 2026) |
| 2 | Loren Legarda | NPC | 21 years, 0 days (June 30, 1998 – June 30, 2004; June 30, 2007 – June 30, 2019; June 30, 2022 – June 30, 2025) | Senate president pro tempore (May 11 – June 3, 2026) |
| 3 | Panfilo Lacson | Independent | 18 years, 0 days (June 30, 2001 – June 30, 2013; June 30, 2016 – June 30, 2022) | Senate president pro tempore (September 8, 2025 – May 11, 2026) |
| 4 | Kiko Pangilinan | Liberal | 18 years, 0 days (June 30, 2001 – June 30, 2013; June 30, 2016 – June 30, 2022) | |
| 5 | Pia Cayetano | Nacionalista | 18 years, 0 days (June 30, 2004 – June 30, 2016; June 30, 2019 – June 30, 2025) | |
| 6 | Lito Lapid | NPC | 18 years, 0 days (June 30, 2004 – June 30, 2016; June 30, 2019 – June 30, 2025) | |
| 7 | Jinggoy Estrada | PMP | 15 years, 0 days (June 30, 2004 – June 30, 2016; June 30, 2022 – June 30, 2025) | Senate president pro tempore (until September 8, 2025) |
| 8 | Francis Escudero | NPC | 15 years, 0 days (June 30, 2007 – June 30, 2019; June 30, 2022 – June 30, 2025) | Senate president (until September 8, 2025) |
| 9 | Juan Miguel Zubiri | Independent | 13 years, 34 days (June 30, 2007 – August 3, 2011; June 30, 2016 – June 30, 2025) | |
| 10 | Alan Peter Cayetano | Independent | 12 years, 321 days (June 30, 2007 – May 17, 2017; June 30, 2022 – June 30, 2025) | Senate president (May 11 – June 3, 2026) |
| 11 | JV Ejercito | NPC | 9 years, 0 days (June 30, 2013 – June 30, 2019; June 30, 2022 – June 30, 2025) | |
| 12 | Sherwin Gatchalian | NPC | 9 years, 0 days (June 30, 2016 – June 30, 2025) | Senate president pro tempore (June 3–17, 2026); Senate president (acting, June 3–17, 2026; from June 17, 2026) |
| 13 | Risa Hontiveros | Akbayan | 9 years, 0 days (June 30, 2016 – June 30, 2025) | |
| 14 | Joel Villanueva | Independent | 9 years, 0 days (June 30, 2016 – June 30, 2025) | |
| 15 | Bam Aquino | KANP | 6 years, 0 days (June 30, 2013 – June 30, 2019) | |
| 16 | Ronald dela Rosa | PDP–Laban | 6 years, 0 days (June 30, 2019 – June 30, 2025) | |
| 17 | Bong Go | PDP–Laban | 6 years, 0 days (June 30, 2019 – June 30, 2025) | |
| 18 | Imee Marcos | Nacionalista | 6 years, 0 days (June 30, 2019 – June 30, 2025) | |
| 19 | Robin Padilla | PDP–Laban | 3 years, 0 days (June 30, 2019 – June 30, 2022) | |
| 20 | Raffy Tulfo | Independent | 3 years, 0 days (June 30, 2019 – June 30, 2022) | |
| 21 | Mark Villar | Nacionalista | 3 years, 0 days (June 30, 2019 – June 30, 2022) | |
| 22 | Rodante Marcoleta | Independent | | |
| 23 | Erwin Tulfo | Lakas | | |
| 24 | Camille Villar | Nacionalista | | |
