= List of senators of the Philippines in the 19th Congress by seniority =

This is a complete list of senators of the Philippines during the 19th Congress of the Philippines listed by seniority from June 30, 2022, to June 30, 2025.

The criteria for seniority used in this article are derived from the cumulative length of service of a member of the Senate prior to the current Congress. Although an official roster ranking senators by seniority is not publicly available, their total cumulative years of service have been used to determine seniority. It has long been customary, following the practice of the United States Senate, to elect the most senior senator as either president of the Senate or president pro tempore, although this practice has become less common in the modern Senate. Furthermore, seniority is traditionally considered in the selection of chairpersons of major Senate committees.

In cases where senators have equal cumulative service, seniority is determined by the following criteria, in order:

- Longest uninterrupted period of service
- Earlier date on which the cumulative length of service was achieved
- Alphabetical order of surnames

In this Congress, Loren Legarda was the most senior senator, having previously served 18 years in Senate, while Mark Villar was the most junior senator.

== List of senators by seniority ==
Rank	Senator	Party		Length of previous tenures (Dates of previous tenures)	Notes
Rank	Senator	Start of Congress	End of Congress	Length of previous tenures (Dates of previous tenures)	Notes
1	Loren Legarda	NPC		18 years, 0 days (June 30, 1998 – June 30, 2004; June 30, 2007 – June 30, 2019)	Senate president pro tempore (until May 20, 2024)
2	Pia Cayetano	Nacionalista		15 years, 0 days (June 30, 2004 – June 30, 2016; June 30, 2019 – June 30, 2022)	
3	Lito Lapid	NPC		15 years, 0 days (June 30, 2004 – June 30, 2016; June 30, 2019 – June 30, 2022)	
4	Bong Revilla	Lakas		15 years, 0 days (June 30, 2004 – June 30, 2016; June 30, 2019 – June 30, 2022)	
5	Jinggoy Estrada	PMP		12 years, 0 days (June 30, 2004 – June 30, 2016)	Senate president pro tempore (from May 20, 2024)
6	Francis Escudero	NPC		12 years, 0 days (June 30, 2007 – June 30, 2019)	Senate president (from May 20, 2024)
7	Koko Pimentel	PDP–Laban	Nacionalista	10 years, 323 days (August 11, 2011 – June 30, 2022)	
8	Juan Miguel Zubiri	Independent		10 years, 34 days (June 30, 2007 – August 3, 2011; June 30, 2016 – June 30, 2022)	Senate president (until May 20, 2024)
9	Alan Peter Cayetano	Independent		9 years, 321 days (June 30, 2007 – May 17, 2017)	
10	Sonny Angara	LDP		9 years, 0 days (June 30, 2013 – June 30, 2022)	
11	Nancy Binay	UNA		9 years, 0 days (June 30, 2013 – June 30, 2022)	
12	Grace Poe	Independent		9 years, 0 days (June 30, 2013 – June 30, 2022)	
13	Cynthia Villar	Nacionalista		9 years, 0 days (June 30, 2013 – June 30, 2022)	
14	JV Ejercito	NPC		6 years, 0 days (June 30, 2013 – June 30, 2019)	
15	Sherwin Gatchalian	NPC		6 years, 0 days (June 30, 2016 – June 30, 2022)	
16	Risa Hontiveros	Akbayan		6 years, 0 days (June 30, 2016 – June 30, 2022)	
17	Joel Villanueva	Independent		6 years, 0 days (June 30, 2016 – June 30, 2022)	
18	Ronald dela Rosa	PDP–Laban		3 years, 0 days (June 30, 2019 – June 30, 2022)	
19	Bong Go	PDP–Laban		3 years, 0 days (June 30, 2019 – June 30, 2022)	
20	Imee Marcos	Nacionalista		3 years, 0 days (June 30, 2019 – June 30, 2022)	
21	Francis Tolentino	PDP–Laban	PFP	3 years, 0 days (June 30, 2019 – June 30, 2022)	
22	Robin Padilla	PDP–Laban			
23	Raffy Tulfo	Independent			
24	Mark Villar	Nacionalista			
