= Philippine Senate Committee on Environment, Natural Resources and Climate Change =

Standing committee of the Senate of the Philippines

Committee on Environment, Natural Resources and Climate Change
- Senate of the Philippines; 20th Congress

History
- New session started: July 28, 2025

Leadership
- Chair: Camille Villar (Nacionalista) since July 29, 2025

Structure
- Seats: 17
- Political groups: Majority (11): NPC (4); Nacionalista (3); Akbayan (1); KANP (1); Lakas (1); Liberal (1); Minority (6): PDP (3); PMP (1); Independent (2)

The Philippine Senate Committee on Environment, Natural Resources and Climate Change is a standing committee of the Senate of the Philippines.

This committee was formed after the Committee on Environment and Natural Resources and the Committee on Climate Change were merged on September 3, 2019, pursuant to Senate Resolution No. 9 of the 18th Congress.

== Jurisdiction ==
According to the Rules of the Senate, the committee handles all matters relating to:

- Conservation and protection of the environment
- Policies, programs, strategies, technologies and other innovations addressing global warming and climate change impacts, including, but not limited to, climate risk management to reduce vulnerability associated with climate-sensitive areas and sectors, the regulation of the impact of human activities on the same, the promotion of environmental awareness of our citizens, the renewal of resources in damaged ecosystems and other environment-related issues
- Adaptation and mitigation or control of greenhouse gas emissions to enhance resilience and to promote sustainable development
- Philippine compliance with the relevant international agreements and cooperation with other countries
- Development, protection, exploration, storage, renewal, regulation and licensing, and wise utilization of the country's national reserves including, but not limited to, forest, mineral, public land, offshore areas and the development of industries based on these resources

== Members, 20th Congress ==
Based on the Rules of the Senate, the Senate Committee on Environment, Natural Resources and Climate Change has 17 members.

Position	Member	Party
Chairperson	Camille Villar	Nacionalista
Vice Chairpersons	Pia Cayetano	Nacionalista
Vice Chairpersons	Ronald dela Rosa	PDP
Vice Chairpersons	Erwin Tulfo	Lakas
Deputy Majority Leaders	JV Ejercito	NPC
Deputy Majority Leaders	Risa Hontiveros	Akbayan
Members for the Majority	Bam Aquino	KANP
Members for the Majority	Win Gatchalian	NPC
Members for the Majority	Lito Lapid	NPC
Members for the Majority	Loren Legarda	NPC
Members for the Majority	Kiko Pangilinan	Liberal
Members for the Majority	Mark Villar	Nacionalista
Deputy Minority Leaders	Rodante Marcoleta	Independent
Deputy Minority Leaders	Joel Villanueva	Independent
Members for the Minority	Jinggoy Estrada	PMP
Members for the Minority	Bong Go	PDP
Members for the Minority	Robin Padilla	PDP

Ex officio members:

- Senate President pro tempore Panfilo Lacson
- Majority Floor Leader Juan Miguel Zubiri
- Minority Floor Leader Alan Peter Cayetano

Committee secretary: Eloisa R. Tecson

== Historical membership rosters ==
=== 19th Congress ===
Position	Member	Party
Chairperson	Cynthia Villar	Nacionalista
Vice Chairperson	Pia Cayetano	Nacionalista
Members for the Majority	JV Ejercito	NPC
Members for the Majority	Mark Villar	Nacionalista
Members for the Majority	Nancy Binay	UNA
Members for the Majority	Alan Peter Cayetano	Independent
Members for the Majority	Ronald dela Rosa	PDP–Laban
Members for the Majority	Win Gatchalian	NPC
Members for the Majority	Bong Go	PDP–Laban
Members for the Majority	Lito Lapid	NPC
Members for the Majority	Loren Legarda	NPC
Members for the Majority	Imee Marcos	Nacionalista
Members for the Majority	Robin Padilla	PDP–Laban
Members for the Majority	Bong Revilla	Lakas
Members for the Majority	Raffy Tulfo	Independent
Members for the Majority	Joel Villanueva	Independent
Member for the Minority	Risa Hontiveros	Akbayan

Committee secretary: Charlyne Claire Fuentes-Olay

=== 18th Congress ===
Position	Member	Party
Chairperson	Cynthia Villar	Nacionalista
Vice Chairpersons	Francis Tolentino	PDP–Laban
Vice Chairpersons	Pia Cayetano	Nacionalista
Members for the Majority	Nancy Binay	UNA
Members for the Majority	Ronald dela Rosa	PDP–Laban
Members for the Majority	Imee Marcos	Nacionalista
Members for the Majority	Manny Pacquiao	PDP–Laban
Members for the Majority	Joel Villanueva	CIBAC
Members for the Majority	Lito Lapid	NPC
Members for the Majority	Richard Gordon	Independent
Members for the Majority	Bong Go	PDP–Laban
Members for the Majority	Win Gatchalian	NPC
Members for the Minority	Francis Pangilinan	Liberal
Members for the Minority	Risa Hontiveros	Akbayan
Members for the Minority	Leila de Lima	Liberal

Committee secretary: Maria Clarinda R. Mendoza

== See also ==
- List of Philippine Senate committees
