= List of senators of the Philippines in the 16th Congress by seniority =

This is a complete list of senators of the Philippines during the 16th Congress of the Philippines listed by seniority from June 30, 2013, to June 30, 2016.

The criteria for seniority used in this article are derived from the cumulative length of service of a member of the Senate prior to the current Congress. Although an official roster ranking senators by seniority is not publicly available, their total cumulative years of service have been used to determine seniority. It has long been customary, following the practice of the United States Senate, to elect the most senior senator as either president of the Senate or president pro tempore, although this practice has become less common in the modern Senate. Furthermore, seniority is traditionally considered in the selection of chairpersons of major Senate committees.

In cases where senators have equal cumulative service, seniority is determined by the following criteria, in order:

- Longest uninterrupted period of service
- Earlier date on which the cumulative length of service was achieved
- Alphabetical order of surnames

In this Congress, Juan Ponce Enrile was the most senior senator, having previously served 19 years in Senate, while Cynthia Villar was the most junior senator.

== List of senators by seniority ==
Rank	Senator	Party		Length of previous tenures (Dates of previous tenures)	Notes
Rank	Senator	Start of Congress	End of Congress	Length of previous tenures (Dates of previous tenures)	Notes
1	Juan Ponce Enrile	PMP		19 years, 320 days (August 15, 1987 – June 30, 1992; June 30, 1995 – June 30, 2001; June 30, 2004 – June 30, 2013)	
2	Tito Sotto	NPC		15 years, 0 days (June 30, 1992 – June 30, 2004; June 30, 2010 – June 30, 2013)	
3	Franklin Drilon	Liberal		15 years, 0 days (June 30, 1995 – June 30, 2007; June 30, 2010 – June 30, 2013)	Senate president
4	Serge Osmeña	Liberal		15 years, 0 days (June 30, 1995 – June 30, 2007; June 30, 2010 – June 30, 2013)	
5	Miriam Defensor Santiago	PRP		15 years, 0 days (June 30, 1995 – June 30, 2001; June 30, 2004 – June 30, 2013)	
6	Gregorio Honasan	UNA		15 years, 0 days (June 30, 1995 – June 30, 2004; June 30, 2007 – June 30, 2013)	
7	Loren Legarda	NPC		12 years, 0 days (June 30, 1995 – June 30, 2001; June 30, 2004 – June 30, 2007)	
8	Ralph Recto	Liberal		9 years, 0 days (June 30, 2001 – June 30, 2007; June 30, 2010 – June 30, 2013)	Senate president pro tempore
9	Pia Cayetano	Nacionalista		9 years, 0 days (June 30, 2004 – June 30, 2013)	
10	Jinggoy Estrada	PMP		9 years, 0 days (June 30, 2004 – June 30, 2013)	
11	Lito Lapid	Independent	Lingap Lugud	9 years, 0 days (June 30, 2004 – June 30, 2013)	
12	Bong Revilla	Lakas		9 years, 0 days (June 30, 2004 – June 30, 2013)	
13	Francis Escudero	Independent		6 years, 0 days (June 30, 2007 – June 30, 2013)	
14	Alan Peter Cayetano	Nacionalista		6 years, 0 days (June 30, 2007 – June 30, 2013)	
15	Antonio Trillanes	Nacionalista		6 years, 0 days (June 30, 2007 – June 30, 2013)	
16	Bongbong Marcos	Nacionalista		3 years, 0 days (June 30, 2010 – June 30, 2013)	
17	TG Guingona	Liberal		3 years, 0 days (June 30, 2010 – June 30, 2013)	
18	Koko Pimentel	PDP–Laban		1 year, 323 days (August 11, 2011 – June 30, 2013)	
19	Sonny Angara	LDP			
20	Bam Aquino	Liberal			
21	Nancy Binay	UNA			
22	JV Ejercito	UNA			
23	Grace Poe	Independent			
24	Cynthia Villar	Nacionalista			
