= Jaime Ferrer =

Filipino politician

Jaime N. Ferrer
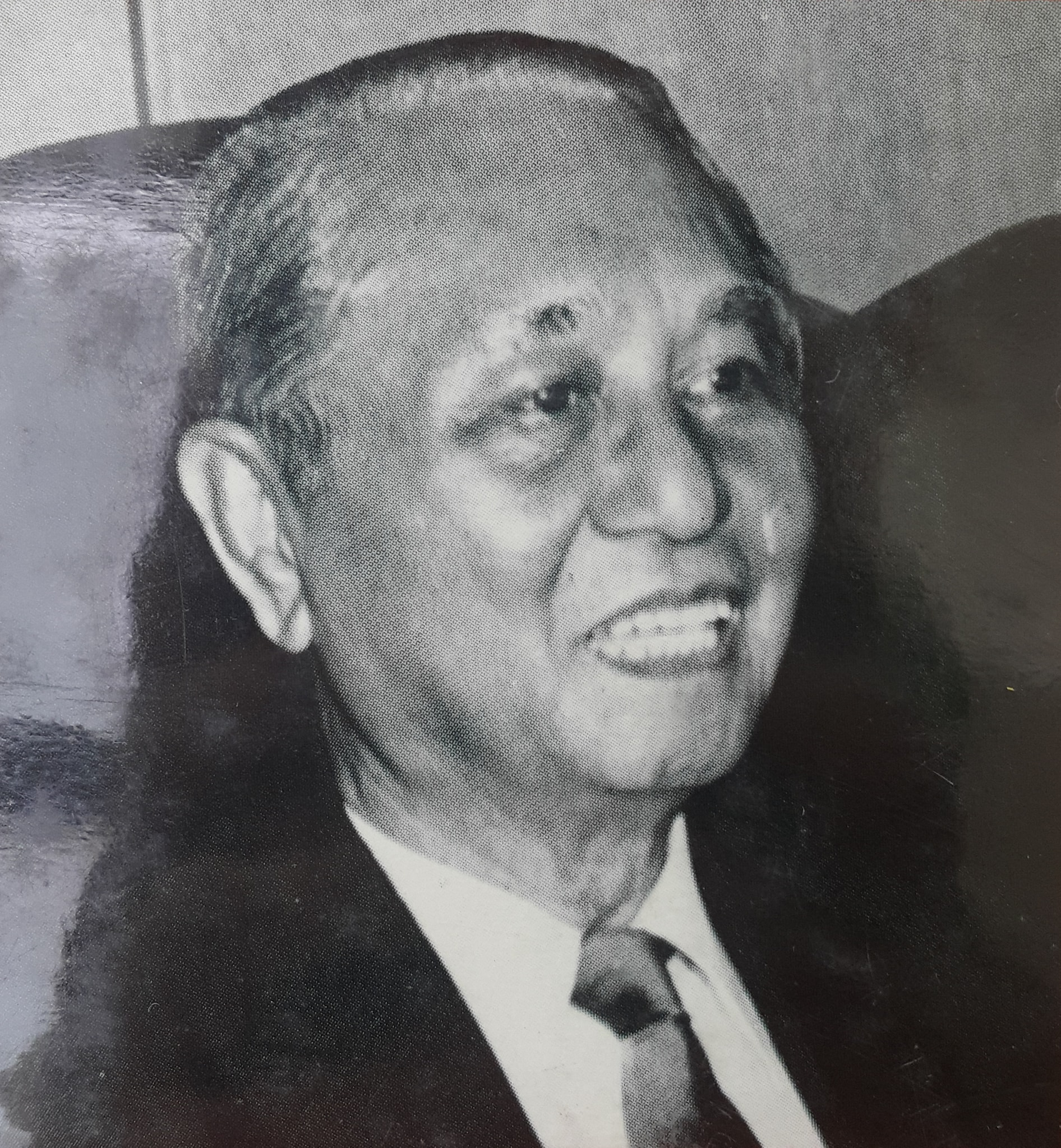

Secretary of Local Government
- In office December 8, 1986 – August 2, 1987
- President: Corazon Aquino
- Preceded by: Aquilino Pimentel Jr.
- Succeeded by: Lito Monico Lorenzana (acting)

Member of the Regular Batasang Pambansa from Las Piñas–Parañaque
- In office July 23, 1984 – March 25, 1986

Chairman of the Commission on Elections
- In office June 10, 1969 – May 28, 1973
- Appointed by: Ferdinand Marcos
- Preceded by: Manuel Arranz
- Succeeded by: Leonardo Perez

Personal details
- Born: October 14, 1916 Parañaque, Rizal, Philippine Islands
- Died: August 2, 1987 (aged 70) Parañaque, Philippines
- Party: PDP–Laban (1982–1987)
- Other political affiliations: UNIDO (1984–1986); Laban (1978–1982); Progressive (1957–1969)
- Spouse: Eriberta Bernabe
- Education: Philippine Law School

Jaime Nery Ferrer (October 14, 1916 – August 2, 1987) was a Filipino lawyer, guerrilla and politician who served as Secretary of Local Government from 1986 until his assassination in 1987. To date, he is the first and only member of the Cabinet of the Philippines to have been assassinated in office.

== Early life ==
Jaime Ferrer was born on October 14, 1916, in San Dionisio, Parañaque. He finished law at the Philippine Law School. While studying, he began working in government in 1934 as a temporary clerk of the General Land Registration Office before moving to the Department of Justice.

== Wartime service ==
At the start of the Second World War, Ferrer married Eriberta Bernabe before joining his brother Juanito in the Hunters ROTC guerrilla unit. He led the unit's activities in Parañaque and later assumed jurisdiction over its activities in Cavite, Rizal, Laguna and parts of Tayabas. He also served as the group's Judge Advocate, trying errant guerrillas, and attained the rank of colonel by the end of the war.

== Career ==
After the war, Ferrer unsuccessfully ran for Congress before becoming member of the barrio council, a member of the Provincial Board of Rizal (of which Parañaque was then part of) and then Division Chief and subsequently Acting Chairman of the Philippine Veterans Board.

In 1953, Ferrer organized the National Citizens' Movement for Free Elections (NAMFREL), which helped monitor the fair conduct of that year's presidential election which was won by Ramon Magsaysay, who later appointed him as Undersecretary of Agriculture and Natural Resources. Despite being a supporter of the Progressive Party in subsequent years, he was appointed Presidential Assistant for Political Affairs under Ferdinand Marcos, who later appointed him to the Commission on Elections (COMELEC) as a commissioner and later chairman from 1969 to 1973. Under his watch, the agency oversaw the conduct of the 1969 presidential election, the 1971 Senate election and the 1973 constitutional plebiscite. He later resigned from office due to his opposition to the way the latter exercise was conducted by show of hands rather than conventional voting following the declaration of martial law by Marcos.

Ferrer became active in organizing opposition movements against the Marcos dictatorship, joining the Lakas ng Bayan party of Senator Benigno Aquino Jr., which later merged with the Partido Demokratiko Pilipino to form the PDP–Laban in 1982. He was elected in the Regular Batasang Pambansa as an oppositionist Assemblyman representing the legislative district of Las Piñas–Parañaque, serving until the dissolution of the body in 1986 following Marcos' fall in the EDSA Revolution. Ferrer joined the cabinet of President Corazon Aquino as Secretary of Local Government after his predecessor, PDP leader Aquilino Pimentel Jr. decided to run for the Senate in 1987. Aged 70, he was considered the oldest member of Aquino's cabinet.

As a cabinet secretary, Ferrer was responsible for overseeing local government institutions across the country at a time when most of them were run by interim officials appointed by the Aquino government pending new elections. During his tenure, he removed 200 OICs for misconduct. He also ordered local officials throughout the country to form unarmed vigilante groups called Nakasaka, whose full meaning translates from Filipino to People United for Peace. Unarmed Only in Theory, and supported the activities of another vigilante group, the Alsa Masa, in combating the Communist rebellion in the Philippines.

== Assassination ==
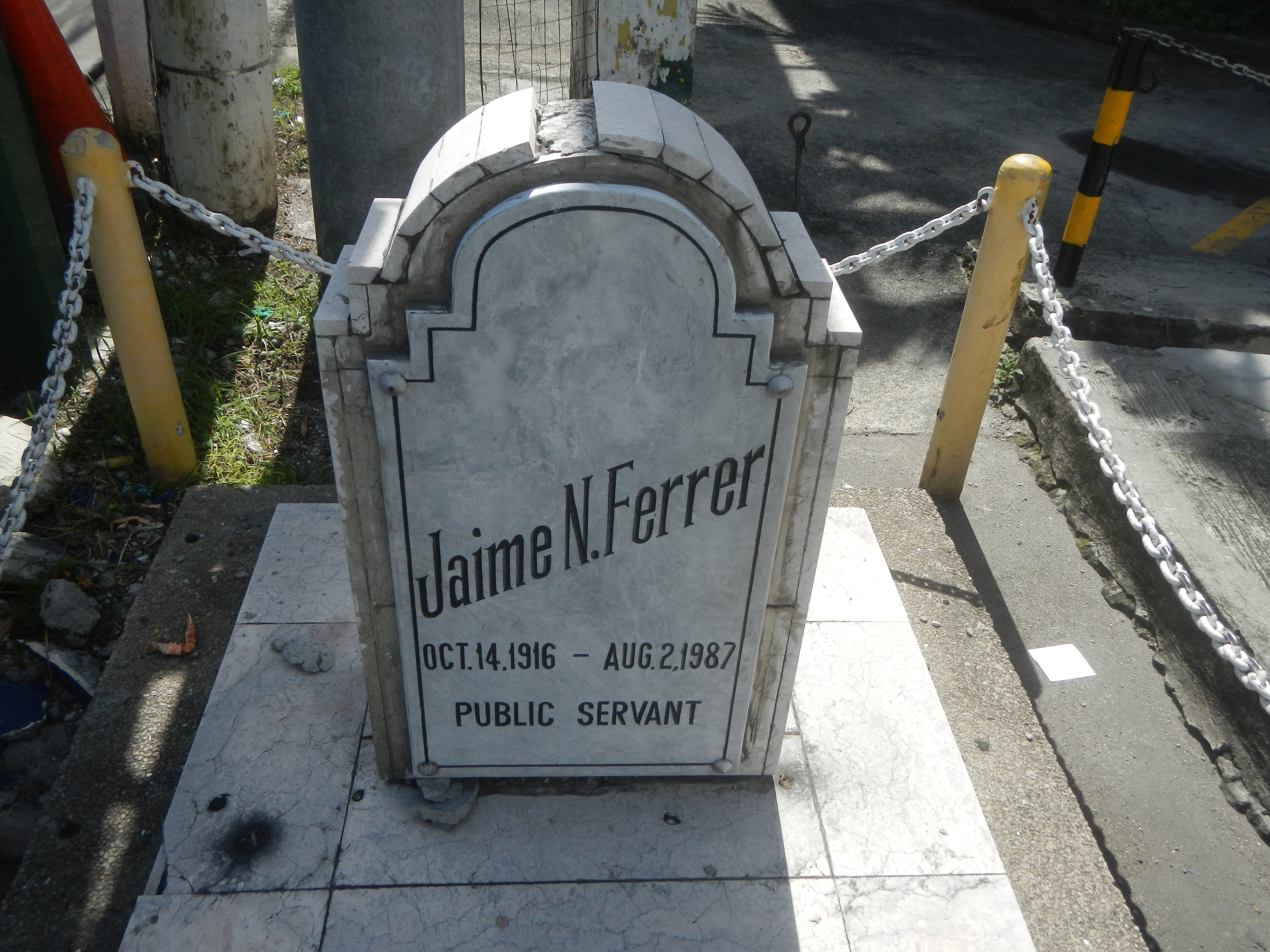
Marker in Parañaque, where Ferrer was assassinated

Ferrer was assassinated by a group of unidentified gunmen on August 2, 1987. He was shot four times in the head and four times in the neck and shoulders a few yards from his home in Parañaque while riding in his car with no bodyguards from mass at Saint Andrew Parish Church. His longtime driver, Zosimo Calderon, was also killed. The assassins exchanged fire with police and stole two vehicles in succession before escaping. He received a state funeral at Manila Memorial Park on August 8.

While no one claimed responsibility for the assassination, speculation focused on the New People's Army, particularly after he was reportedly placed in one of their supposed hit lists a few months before his death. Another subsequent claim was that the assassination was part of destabilization efforts by rightwing forces against the government of President Aquino.
