= Holy Child Catholic School =

Roman Catholic school in Manila, Philippines

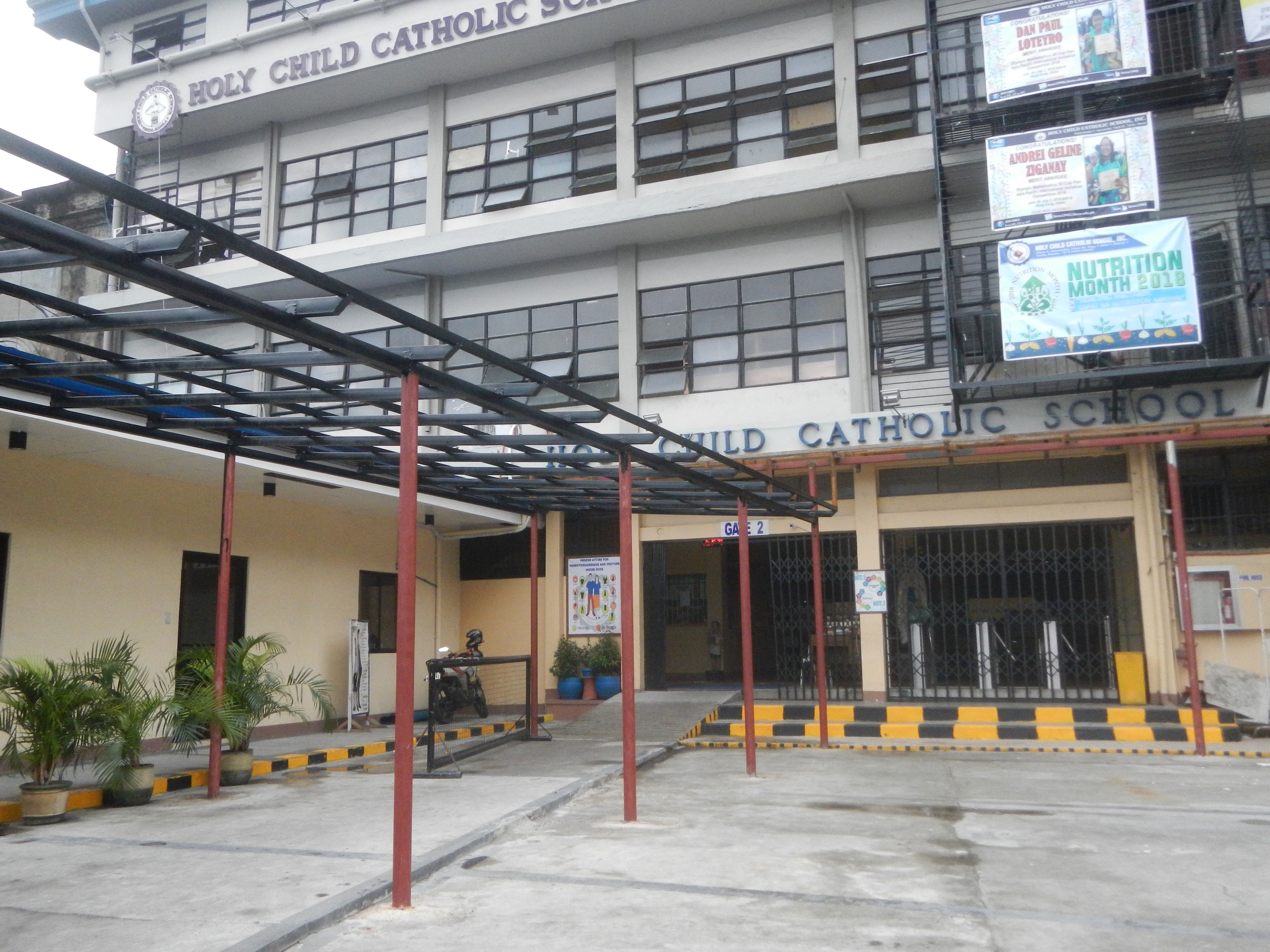
- School facade in 2018

Location
- Plaza A. Hernandez; Tondo, Manila, Metro Manila; Philippines
- Coordinates: 14°36′27″N 120°58′04″E

Information
- Former names: Tondo Parochial School
- Motto: Cum Jesu Salus - originally used in the Tondo Parochial School badge or Logo; Sapientia Aetate et Gratia (lit. ' Wisdom, Age, and Grace') - from Luke 2:52, a recent adaptation by a former director of the school
- Director: Rev. Fr. Nicanor A. Celiano Jr.
- Grades: K to 12
- Nickname: HCCSIAN
- Hymn: HCCS Hymn composed by the founder, Rev. Msgr. Jose N. Jovellanos (Ret.)

Holy Child Catholic School is located at Plaza Amado V. Hernandez in Tondo, Manila, Philippines. It sits beside the Santo Niño de Tondo Parish Church.

== History ==
During the Liberation Period immediately following World War II, Rt. Rev Msgr. Jose N. Jovellanos, and four Jesuit priests founded the Tondo Parochial School. It was located at the site of the defunct Instituto de Mujeres, where the Manila Cathedral School is now located. Classes began on July 2, 1945.

Later, the school was moved to its location beside the Sto. Niño Church, where the Tondo Orphanage used to stand. The government began to recognize it as a legitimate school on February 22, 1951. The school became a corporation on October 23, 1954, under the name Holy Child Catholic School (HCCS). In 1955, HCCS was granted government recognition for complete secondary and kindergarten courses. Then, the school graduated its first high school students.

== Notable alumni ==
- Manny Villar – Businessman, former Speaker of the House, Senate President and presidential candidate
- Florin Hilbay – 1999 Bar Exams topnotcher, former Solicitor General
