= Legislative district of Las Piñas–Parañaque =

Legislative district of the Philippines

The Legislative district of Las Piñas–Parañaque was the combined representation of the Metropolitan Manila municipalities of Las Piñas and Parañaque in the Regular Batasang Pambansa from 1984 to 1986.

== History ==
Prior to gaining joint representation, Las Piñas and Parañaque were represented under the provinces of Manila (1898–1899) and Rizal (1907–1972). Parañaque was annexed to the City of Greater Manila and was represented as part of Manila's at-large district during the National Assembly of the Japanese-sponsored Second Philippine Republic from 1943 to 1944, while Las Piñas remained under Rizal. These two municipalities were separated from the province to form the Metropolitan Manila Area on 7 November 1975 by virtue of Presidential Decree No. 824; Metro Manila was represented in the Interim Batasang Pambansa as Region IV from 1978 to 1984.

Among the amendments to the 1973 Constitution of the Philippines which were approved in the January 1984 plebiscite was a new apportionment ordinance for the election of Regular Batasang Pambansa members, as embodied in Batas Pambansa Blg. 643. Under this apportionment ordinance, the municipalities of Las Piñas and Parañaque were grouped into a single parliamentary district which was allotted one representative, who was elected at large in the May 1984 elections. The combined representation of the two municipalities lasted until the abolition of the Regular Batasang Pambansa in the aftermath of the People Power Revolution in 1986.

Under the new Constitution which was proclaimed on 11 February 1987, Las Piñas was combined with Muntinlupa to form the congressional district of Las Piñas–Muntinlupa, while Parañaque formed its own congressional district. Each elected its member to the restored House of Representatives starting that same year.

== At-Large (defunct) ==
Period	Representative
Regular Batasang Pambansa; 1984–1986	Jaime N. Ferrer

== See also ==
- Legislative districts of Rizal
- Legislative district of Las Piñas-Muntinlupa
  - Legislative district of Las Piñas
- Legislative district of Parañaque
