= Cynthia Villar =

Filipina businesswoman and politician (born 1950)

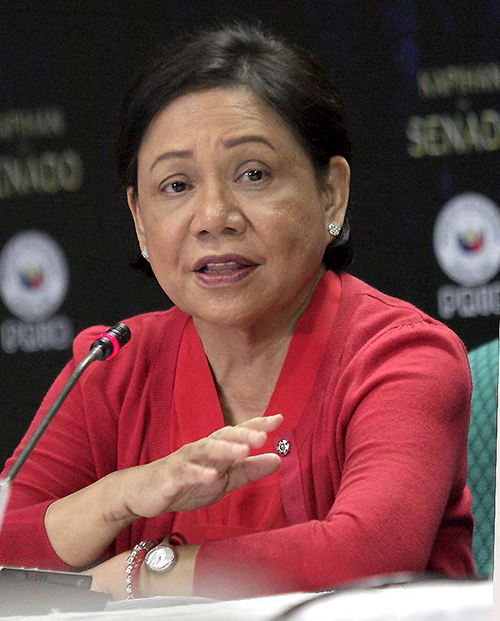
- Villar in 2015

Senator of the Philippines
- In office June 30, 2013 – June 30, 2025

Chair of the Senate Agriculture, Food and Agrarian Reform Committee
- In office July 23, 2019 – June 30, 2025
- Preceded by: Alan Peter Cayetano (Agrarian Reform Committee)
- Succeeded by: Francis Pangilinan

Chair of the Senate Environment, Natural Resources and Climate Change Committee
- In office September 3, 2019 – June 30, 2025
- Preceded by: Committee established
- Succeeded by: Camille Villar

Chair of the Senate Climate Change Committee
- In office July 22, 2019 – September 3, 2019
- Preceded by: Loren Legarda
- Succeeded by: Committee dissolved

Chair of the Senate Environment and Natural Resources
- In office July 25, 2016 – September 3, 2019
- Preceded by: Loren Legarda
- Succeeded by: Committee dissolved

Chair of the Senate Agriculture and Food Committee
- In office February 27, 2017 – September 3, 2019
- Preceded by: Francis Pangilinan
- Succeeded by: Committee dissolved
- In office July 22, 2013 – June 30, 2016
- Preceded by: Francis Pangilinan
- Succeeded by: Francis Pangilinan

Chair of the Senate Government Corporations and Public Enterprises Committee
- In office July 22, 2013 – June 30, 2016
- Preceded by: Franklin Drilon
- Succeeded by: Dick Gordon

Member of the Philippine House of Representatives from Las Piñas
- In office June 30, 2001 – June 30, 2010
- Preceded by: Manny Villar
- Succeeded by: Mark Villar

Personal details
- Born: Cynthia Ampaya Aguilar; July 29, 1950 (age 76) Muntinlupa, Rizal, Philippines
- Party: Nacionalista (2004–present)
- Other political affiliations: Independent (2001–2004)
- Spouse: Manny Villar (m. 1975)
- Children: Manuel Paolo; Mark; Camille
- Parent(s): Filemon Aguilar; Lydia Ampaya Aguilar
- Education: University of the Philippines Diliman (BSBA); New York University (MBA)
- Occupation: Politician
- Profession: Businesswoman

Cynthia Aguilar Villar (Tagalog pronunciation: [vilˈjar], born Cynthia Ampaya Aguilar on July 29, 1950) is a Filipino politician and businesswoman who served as a senator of the Philippines from 2013 to 2025. She was a member of the House of Representatives for the Lone District of Las Piñas from 2001 to 2010 before winning a seat in the Senate in 2013, placing tenth. Villar was re-elected for a second term in the Senate in the 2019 Philippine Senate elections, earning what was then the most votes in senate election history, until this number was surpassed by Robin Padilla in 2022.

Throughout her political career, Villar consistently ranked as the wealthiest lawmaker in both the House of Representatives and the Senate.

== Early life and education ==
Villar was born on July 29, 1950, in Muntinlupa, then a municipality in Rizal, to Filemon Aguilar, a long-time mayor of Las Piñas and congressman, and Lydia Ampaya. Her brother, Vergel Aguilar, also served as mayor of Las Piñas.

She spent her elementary years at Muntinlupa Elementary School, where she graduated in 1962. In 1966, she graduated high school from Philippine Christian University. She then obtained a degree in Bachelor of Science in Business Administration at the University of the Philippines Diliman (UP Diliman) in 1970. It is where in UP she met her husband, Senator Manny Villar. Two years later, in 1972, she obtained a master's degree in Business Administration at the New York University.

In 2017, she received the Most Distinguished Alumni award from the University of the Philippines Alumni Association.

== Business career ==
She practiced as a financial analyst at the Philippine Shares Corporation and a professor at the Far Eastern University before marrying Villar in 1975. After her marriage, she helped her husband in managing his business ventures and became the director and vice president of Household Finance Corporation. She later managed Capitol Development Bank, where she served as its treasurer from 1989 to 1990 and its president from 1990 to 1998.

In 1992, she founded the Villar Foundation, where she is currently its managing director.

When Manny Villar became Speaker of the House of Representatives in 1998, she became the chairwoman of the Congressional Spouses Foundation, serving until 2000.

== Political career ==
In the year of 2001, Villar ran as Representative of the Lone District of Las Piñas and won in a landslide victory. She served in that post until 2010.

When her husband became the Senate President in 2006, she became the president of the Senate Spouses Foundation, Inc., serving until December 2008.

Plunder charges were filed in 2008 against Villar, then a representative, and her husband, then-senator Manny Villar. The plunder complaint relates to an alleged fraudulent deal in 1998 with the Bangko Sentral ng Pilipinas. She and her husband were cleared of the charges by the Office of the Ombudsman in 2010.

In 2013, Villar ran as senator under the ticket of his husband's rival in the 2010 presidential elections, President Benigno Aquino III and won, finishing in 10th place.

On July 10, 2014, Villar criticized the arrest of senators Bong Revilla, Juan Ponce Enrile, and Jinggoy Estrada after the three were linked as the masterminds to the Priority Development Assistance Fund scam or Pork Barrel scandal.

On May 19, 2015, Villar was the richest senator in the Philippines with a 2014 net worth of ₱1,983,480,135. On May 17, 2016, Villar's wealth increased by 76% according to government data.

In August 2016, Villar's son, Mark Villar, was appointed by newly elected president Rodrigo Duterte as the public works and highways secretary. In October 2016, Villar backed President Duterte's Philippine drug war, which according to rights groups and activists has killed at least 20,000 Filipinos. In November 2016, Villar voted against a resolution which sought to reject the Duterte-initiated burial of the late dictator Ferdinand Marcos in the Libingan ng mga Bayani.

In February 2017, Villar voted in favor of the Tax Reform for Acceleration and Inclusion Act, which increased the inflation rate and cost of goods in the country. Villar afterwards blamed "traders" for the negative effects of the law that she supported. On the same month, after President Rodrigo Duterte announced his intention to withdraw a treaty with the United States, Villar followed suit by not supporting the resolution requiring Senate concurrence on treaty withdrawals. On June 14, 2017, Villar urged the government to impose a ban in 'unli-rice'. On December 13, 2017, Villar was unable to vote for the martial law extension in Mindanao, but senator Vicente Sotto III noted that she “would have voted yes.”

On March 6, 2018, Villar stated that she has 'no conflict of interest' into investigations into the status of Boracay, despite her family's ownership of properties on the island. In June 2018, Villar rejected the possibility of same sex marriage in the Philippines. On May 16, 2018, a local executive revealed that Villar's property firm was behind the leveling and destruction of mountains in Boracay. On May 17, 2018, Villar did not support the resolution against the ouster of Chief Justice Maria Lourdes Sereno via a quo warranto petition. In October, she filed her certificate of candidacy for re-election in the 2019 senate elections. On July 23, 2018, Villar announced that she "admired" President Rodrigo Duterte. On November 26, 2018, Villar supported a "60–40 profit sharing with China."

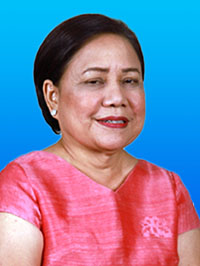
Villar's Commission on Appointments portrait for the 19th Congress

In January 2019, President Rodrigo Duterte backed Villar's re-election candidacy. Villar then placed first in the Senate race with 25,283,727 votes, and was re-elected for a second term in the Senate.

On March 26, 2024, the United Nations Association of the Philippines bestowed upon Villar the Human Rights Award for her Sustainable Development Goal 1 (Poverty Eradication), SDG Goal 16 (Biodiversity) and promoting environmental well-being.

Upon being term-limited as senator, Villar sought a comeback as representative for Las Piñas's lone district in 2025. However, she lost to councilor Mark Anthony Santos, ending the Aguilar-Villar family's three-decade reign over the seat since it was known as the Las Piñas–Muntinlupa's at-large congressional district.

== Controversies ==
=== On nurses ===
In a senatorial forum on GMA News TV on February 23, 2013, economist Winnie Monsod asked Villar to explain why, as chairman of the House Committee on High Education, she opposed the move to close nursing schools that the Commission on Higher Education (CHED) said did not meet minimum requirements to continue operations.

She explained that she favored the students who wanted to continue their schooling. CHED, she said, wanted to close the nursing schools because they didn't have the required tertiary hospitals where the nurses would eventually be trained before they graduate and get their BS Nursing degrees.

This part of Villar's response became controversial: "Actually, hindi naman kailangan ng nurse na matapos ang BSN (BS Nursing). Kasi itong mga nurses, gusto lang nilang maging room nurse, o sa Amerika o sa other countries, ay mag-aalaga lang sila. Hindi naman kailangan na ganoon sila kagaling. (Nurses don't actually need to finish BS Nursing. These nurses only want to become a room nurse or caregivers in America or in other countries. They don't need to be that good.)", Villar said in response.

Villar apologized on March 4, 2013, to Filipino nurses who were hurt by her recent statement on the nursing profession.

“Taos-puso po akong humihingi ng paumanhin sa lahat ng mga nurse at kani-kanilang pamilya na labis na nasaktan sa aking kasagutan sa tanong na ibinato sa akin sa isang programa sa TV (I sincerely apologize to all the nurses and their families who were hurt by my response to the question I was asked on TV),” she posted on her Twitter account.

=== On corn research ===
During the deliberations for the Department of Agriculture's budget for 2020, their proposed budget included ₱150 million for research on the National Corn Program. While reading the budget proposal, Villar stated:

"... bakit lahat ng inyong budget puro research? Baliw na baliw kayo sa research. Aanihin niyo ba yung research? Ako, matalino akong tao, pero hindi ko maintindihan yung research niyo. Lalo na yung farmer, gusto ba ng farmer yung research? Hindi ba gusto nila tulungan niyo sila? (... why does it look like all of your budget goes to research? You are so obsessed with research. What will you get out of research? Me, I'm a smart person, but I don't understand your research. What more for farmers? Do they want research? Don't they want you to help them?)"

Criticisms for this statement came from multiple sources, including news articles and comments on recorded footage of Villar saying it. Villar then responded that she just wanted the budget to be allocated properly.

=== On physicians during the COVID-19 pandemic ===
On August 1, 2020, Villar again drew flak in the midst of the COVID-19 pandemic after a group of physicians appealed to the national government to revert the National Capital Region back to an enhanced community quarantine due to the disappointing increase in the number of COVID-19 cases. When asked for comment, Villar was noted to say, “Hindi na siguro. Pagbutihan nila trabaho nila. (Maybe not. They should just do their jobs better.)”. Many on social media were offended by her statement. Several hours later, her name trended on Twitter including calls to boycott the products that belong to her family business including the residential community, Camella and the shopping mall chain, Vista Malls.

She later said that she was referring to workers in government, including herself.

== Flood control ==
Cynthia Villar was the proponent of the Las Piñas-Zapote River Drive project meant to control flooding and clean the Zapote River in Las Piñas City. The infrastructure project cost ₱2.42-billion, funded through the General Appropriations Act from 2011 to 2022. It was constructed in several phases beginning 2012. A maintenance road that is part of the project was opened to private vehicles by the Las Piñas City government to ease traffic. Despite the completion of the project in 2022, residents still experience flooding during heavy rains and the river continues to be polluted. The project passes through businesses and real estate owned by the Villar family and has raised allegations of conflicts of interest.

House of Representatives of the Philippines
| Preceded by Manny Villar | Member of the Philippine House of Representatives from Las Piñas' Lone District; 2001–2010 | Succeeded by Mark Villar |
Senate of the Philippines
| Preceded by Franklin Drilon | Chair of the Philippine Senate; Government Corporations and Public Enterprises Committee; 2013–2016 | Succeeded by Richard J. Gordon |
| Preceded by Francis Pangilinan | Chair of the Philippine Senate; Agriculture and Food Committee; 2013–2016 | Succeeded by Francis Pangilinan |
| Preceded by Loren Legarda | Chair of the Philippine Senate; Environment and Natural Resources Committee; 2016–present | Incumbent |
| Preceded by Francis Pangilinan | Chair of the Philippine Senate; Agriculture and Food Committee; 2017–present | Incumbent |
| Preceded by Alan Peter Cayetano | Chair of the Philippine Senate; Agrarian Reform Committee; 2017–present | Incumbent |
