= Manny Villar =

President of the Senate of the Philippines from 2006 to 2008

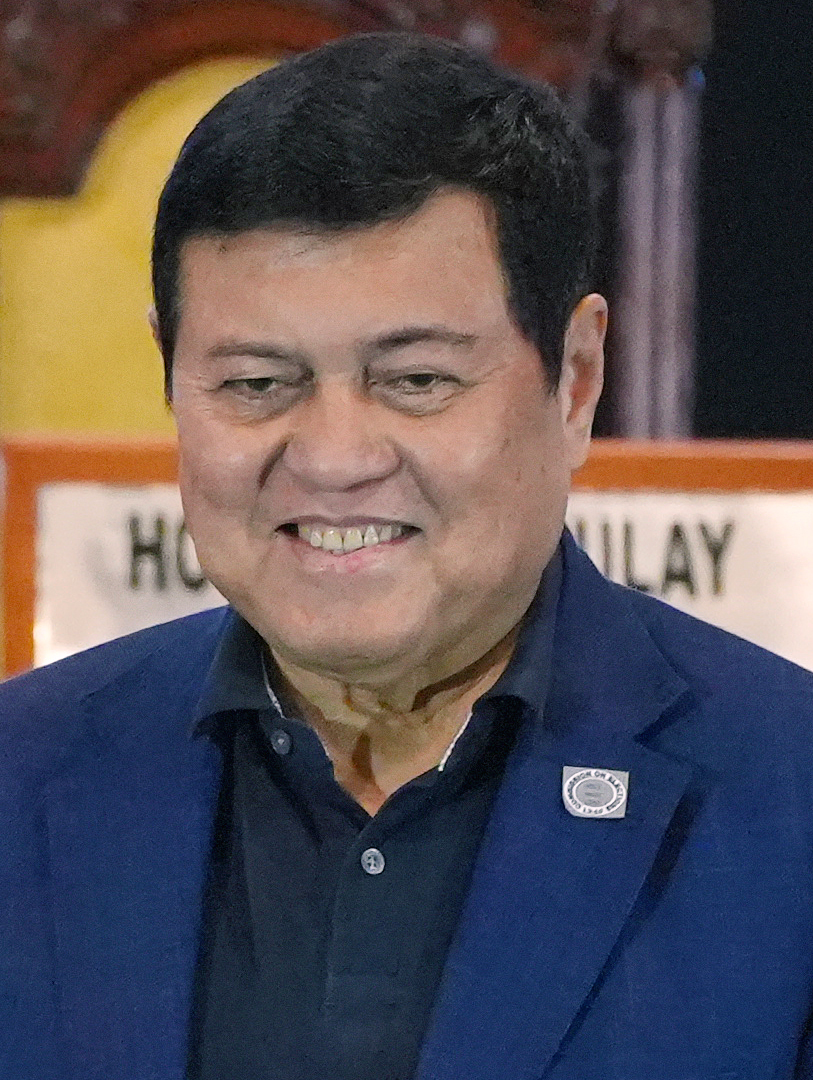
- Villar in 2025

25th President of the Senate of the Philippines
- In office July 24, 2006 – November 17, 2008
- Preceded by: Franklin Drilon
- Succeeded by: Juan Ponce Enrile

President pro tempore of the Senate of the Philippines
- In office July 23, 2001 – August 12, 2002
- Preceded by: Blas Ople
- Succeeded by: Juan Flavier

Senator of the Philippines
- In office June 30, 2001 – June 30, 2013

18th Speaker of the House of Representatives of the Philippines
- In office July 27, 1998 – November 13, 2000
- President: Joseph Estrada
- Preceded by: Jose de Venecia Jr.
- Succeeded by: Arnulfo Fuentebella

Member of the Philippine House of Representatives
- In office June 30, 1998 – June 30, 2001
- Preceded by: District established
- Succeeded by: Cynthia Villar
- Constituency: Las Piñas
- In office June 30, 1992 – June 30, 1998
- Preceded by: Filemon C. Aguilar
- Succeeded by: District abolished
- Constituency: Las Piñas–Muntinlupa

8th President of the Nacionalista Party
- Incumbent
- Assumed office 2003
- Preceded by: Salvador Laurel

Personal details
- Born: Manuel Bamba Villar Jr. December 13, 1949 (age 76) Tondo, Manila, Philippines
- Party: Nacionalista (2003–present)
- Other political affiliations: Independent (2000–2003); LAMMP (1998–2000); Lakas (1992–1998)
- Spouse: Cynthia Aguilar (m. 1975)
- Children: 3, including Mark and Camille
- Education: University of the Philippines Diliman (BS, MBA)
- Occupation: Businessperson, politician
- Known for: Chairman of Vista Land & Lifescapes; Chairman of Starmalls, Inc. Chairman of Golden MV
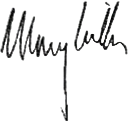
- Signature
- Website: mannyvillar.com.ph

Manuel Bamba Villar Jr. (Tagalog pronunciation: [bɪlˈjaɾ]; born December 13, 1949) is a Filipino businessman and former politician. He previously served as senator from 2001 to 2013 and as the 25th president of the Senate of the Philippines from 2006 to 2008. Before his stint in the senate, he represented the district of Las Piñas–Muntinlupa from 1992 to 1998, and Las Piñas's at-large district from 1998 to 2001. He also became the speaker of the House of Representatives from 1998 to 2000; in this term, he presided over the impeachment of President Joseph Estrada. In 2025, Forbes magazine named Villar as the richest person in the Philippines, with an estimated net worth of US$17.2 billion.

Villar was born to a poor family in Tondo, an impoverished and densely populated district of Manila. After graduating from the University of the Philippines, he worked as an accountant and financial analyst, then launched a highly successful business in real estate. Villar's companies have built over 200,000 homes, and his business career made him one of the wealthiest persons in the Philippines.

He ran for president in the 2010 presidential elections under the Nacionalista Party, but lost to Benigno Aquino III.

== Early life and education ==
Manuel Villar was born on December 13, 1949, in Tondo, an impoverished and densely populated district of Manila. He was the second-born of the nine children of his parents in a poor family. His father, Manuel "Maning" Montalban Villar Sr., was a government employee from Cabatuan, Iloilo who worked as an inspector for the Bureau of Fisheries. His mother, Curita "Curing" Bamba, was a seafood vendor from a poor family in Orani, Bataan. The family lived in a small rented apartment in a run down slum area. Villar's father was eventually granted a year-long scholarship for higher education in the United States, which led to a job promotion to a director position in the Department of Agriculture and Natural Resources upon his return. Due to cramped conditions in Tondo, Villar's father obtained a ₱16,000 loan from the Government Service Insurance System, payable in 20 to 25 years, to build a home in San Rafael Village, Navotas. As a child, Villar initially attended Isabelo delos Reyes Elementary School, a nearby public school in Tondo. He also assisted his mother in selling shrimp and fish at the Divisoria Public Market, as early as age six, in order to help earn the money to support his siblings and himself to school. However, accompanying his mother interfered with his education and he was forced to drop out from school during Grade 1. He was then enrolled at Tondo Parochial School (later renamed Holy Child Catholic School), a private school in Tondo run by priests, to complete his elementary education.

Villar finished his high school education at the Mapúa Institute of Technology in Santa Cruz, adjacent to Tondo. He attended the University of the Philippines Diliman, where he joined the Pan Xenia fraternity in his junior year, and earned his bachelor's degree in business administration in 1970 and his master's degree in business administration in 1973. He later characterized himself as being impatient with formal schooling, and eager to start working and go into business.

== Business career ==
After obtaining his bachelor's degree, Villar began his professional career working as an accountant for Sycip, Gorres, Velayo & Co. (SGV & Co). He resigned from SGV & Co. to start his first business, delivering seafood in Makati. However, when his largest customer was unable to pay him, he negotiated a debt restructuring of sorts, selling discounted meal tickets to office workers in exchange for receivables. He then worked briefly as a financial analyst for the Private Development Corporation of the Philippines, where his job was to sell World Bank loans. Wanting to start a business of his own again, he quit his job and availed of one of the loans, which offered attractive rates.

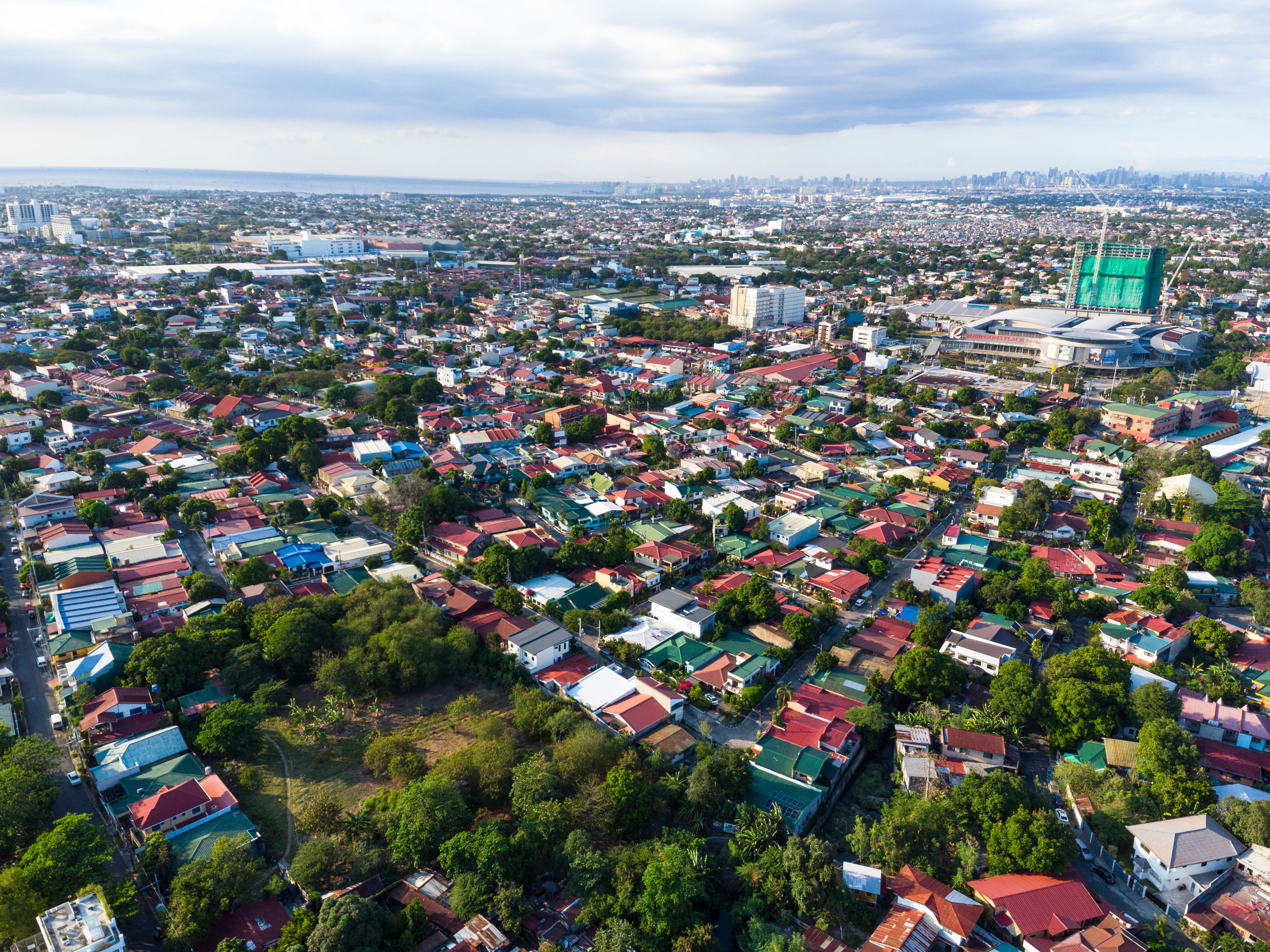
First venture of Manny Villar - Camella Homes 1 and 2 in Las Piñas

In 1975, with an initial capital of ₱10,000 (equivalent to ₱339,954 in 2021), Villar purchased two reconditioned trucks and started a business delivering sand and gravel for construction companies in Las Piñas. This eventually segued into building houses, as Villar took out a seven-year loan from a rural bank offering low interest rates. He initiated mass housing projects through economies of scale, utilizing the cost advantages of developing a large-scale project in order to bring down housing prices. The number of homes built by Villar's companies totaled to over 200,000 units.

In the 1980s, Villar established Prime Water to operate and maintain water distribution systems throughout the country. It counts a 25-year partnership with the municipality of Daraga to deliver bulk water, a 25-year joint venture agreement with Lingayen Water District in Pangasinan, and a 25-year joint agreement with the Leyte Metropolitan Water District among its 30 water projects with local water districts. The Commission on Audit's 2018 annual report flagged Prime Water's operations in Guagua, Pampanga, due to high levels of arsenic. The company produces over 170 million liters of treated water daily, supplied by more than 250 deep wells and surface water resources, and is directly involved in delivering water to more than 150,000 households across the Philippines. Now under the Villar Group of Companies, the water utility firm is led by their eldest son, Paolo.

In 1984, he founded Golden Haven Memorial Park, a chain of cemeteries in the Philippines, started with its first branch in Las Piñas and expanded in Cebu, Cagayan de Oro, Zamboanga, Bulacan, and Iloilo. It also expanded into the businesses of memorial chapel, crematorium and columbarium.

In July 1995, Villar's flagship property, C&P Homes, was listed on the Philippine Stock Exchange and grew by more than a third in one day, ballooning Villar's 80% stake in the company to US$1.5 billion. A few years later during the presidency of Joseph Estrada and with him being Speaker of the House of Representatives, controversy arose regarding its default as a fall-out from the Asian Financial Crisis and negotiation of restructuring.

Vista Land and Lifescapes Inc, a family-owned business of Villar, is also listed in the privately owned Philippine Stock Exchange. Their shares of stocks were bought primarily by foreign funds which had given the government, as well as the PSE, good revenues.

Villar has received several awards for his achievements during his professional and business career, including being one of the Ten Outstanding Young Men in 1986, the Agora Award for Marketing Management in 1989, Most Outstanding CPA by the Institute of Certified Public Accountants in 1990, and Most Outstanding UP Alumnus in 1991. In 2004, he was named the Most Distinguished Alumnus, the highest recognition given by the University of the Philippines Alumni Association.

In a report of International Consortium of Investigative Journalists on offshore leaks in April 2013, Villar was listed among the businessmen with offshore accounts. It was revealed that Villar owned an account in the British Virgin Islands.

In 2015, the MB Villar Group formed another company, Vitacare Healthgroup, Inc., to build chain of hospitals nationwide. Its first project Vitacare Unimed Hospital & Medical Center (in partnership with Unimed) will be located in Vista City, Las Piñas will be fully operated in 2018.

As of September 2018, Forbes magazine ranked him as the second-wealthiest person in the Philippines, with his net worth of US$5 billion or ₱269 billion. However, his statements of assets and liabilities (SALN) filed for the year 2012 states his net worth at ₱1.453 billion.

In 2019, Forbes magazine named Villar as the new richest individual in the Philippines, with an estimated net worth of US$5.5 billion, surpassing Henry Sy Sr. In 2021, his net worth surged to approximately $6.7 billion despite being overtaken by the Sy siblings in Forbes' annual Philippines rich list.

Villar became the richest individual again surpassing Enrique Razon in March 2025, after his company Golden MV Holdings, Inc. (Villar Land) reportedly profitted ₱1 trillion due to fair value gains linked to Villar City. However Villar's net worth dropped to US$8.4 billion in November 2025 being $2 billion poorer. This is atributted to the valuation controversy associated with Villar Land. In March 2026, Razon became the richest Filipino individual once again with $13 billion net worth.

== Political career ==
=== House of Representatives ===
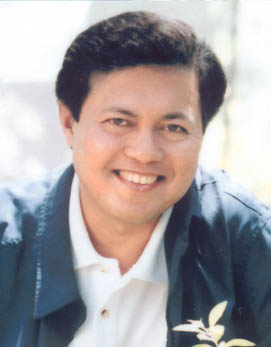
Villar in the 1990s

Succeeding his father-in-law, Dr. Filemon Aguilar Sr., Villar began his political career when he was elected representative of Las Piñas-Muntinlupa's at-large district in 1992. At 42 years old, he was one of the youngest members of the House of Representatives. In the first 100 days of the 9th Congress, Villar filed the largest amount of local bills in the House of Representatives. Due to congressional redistricting, he later represented the district of Las Piñas.

Villar became the speaker of the House of Representatives in 1998, during his third term in congress. As speaker, he presided over the impeachment of President Joseph Estrada over corruption allegations in November 2000. Along with a large group of lawmakers, Villar defected from Estrada's Laban ng Makabayang Masang Pilipino (LAMMP) coalition to hasten the process of impeachment. However, he was ousted as speaker by Estrada's allies, replacing him with Camarines Sur representative Arnulfo Fuentebella.

=== Senate ===
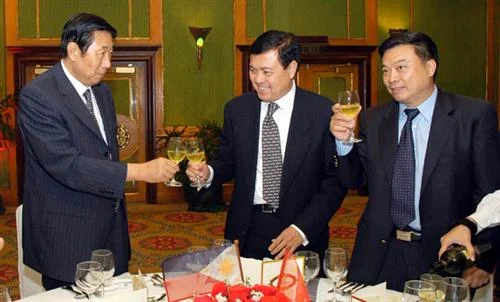
Wen Shizhen (left) of China's National People's Congress with Villar as Senate President (center) at Century Park Hotel, November 2006

Villar ran and won a seat as a senator in the 2001 elections. He ran as an independent candidate, but campaigned as a member of the People Power Coalition. He was later reelected in 2007, running as a member of the Genuine Opposition coalition.

In July 2006, Villar became the Senate president, making him the first post-World War II public official to head both the House of Representatives and the Senate.

In November 2008, due to issues regarding the construction of a road extension in C-5, Villar lost support and resigned as president of the Senate. A Senate inquiry, launched in 2010 to probe the C-5 road south extension initiated by Villar and aligned pass through his real estate businesses, ruled that Villar amassed wealth by overpricing right-of-way payments. The resulting Senate report stated, "For the benefit of his corporations, Senator Villar made the Filipino people suffer the total amount of P6,226,070,427". Economist Winnie Monsod described the C-5 extension project as "unnecessary" and "wasteful".

Manny and Cynthia Villar have been linked to the pork barrel scam. Janet Lim-Napoles alleged in an affidavit that she gave campaign contributions to Manny Villar in Mandaluyong and alleged that in 2004 he received kickbacks of 30% from the purchase of computers P3.7 million for the Department of Transportation and Communications. Cynthia Villar denied the allegations. In 2013, Leody de Guzman of Bukluran ng Manggagawang Pilipino filed a letter with the Philippine Department of Justice alleging that the Villars' use of P151 million of their pork barrel violated the procurement law.

== 2010 presidential campaign ==
Villar ran in the 2010 presidential election under the Nacionalista Party, with Senator Loren Legarda as his running mate.

During the campaign, columnist William Esposo claimed that Villar lied in his television commercials and could not have been poor because his younger brother was admitted to FEU Hospital, which he claims was a top hospital at the time and, in 1962, there was no bone marrow transplantation and chemotherapy in the country yet. Villar clarified that his brother was admitted as a charity patient because the family was unable to afford treatment.

Villar lost the election to Benigno Aquino III after placing third with 5,573,835 votes.

== Personal life ==
As a junior at the University of the Philippines Diliman, Villar became friends with Cynthia Aguilar, his classmate at the UP College of Business Administration. They married at age 25. They have three children: Manuel Paolo, Mark, and Camille. Villar and Aguilar families are also has a longtime friendship with the family of Romeo Jalosjos Sr., fellow politicians and chairman of Television and Production Exponents (TAPE) Inc., the former producer of the longest-running noontime variety show Eat Bulaga!, and its successor, Tahanang Pinakamasaya.

== Philanthropy ==
In 2024, Manuel Villar was recognized in Forbes Asia's Heroes of Philanthropy list for his significant charitable contributions. He donated ₱615 million to build a church and school in Bulacan and provided land valued at ₱613 million to the Diocese of Malolos.

== Electoral history ==
Electoral history of Manny Villar
Year	Office	Party	Votes received				Result
Year	Office	Party	Total	%	P.	Swing	Result
1992	Representative (Las Piñas–Muntinlupa)	Independent	99,714	56.27%	1st	—N/a	Won
1995	Representative (Las Piñas–Muntinlupa)	Lakas	142,494	84.10%	1st	+27.83	Won
1998	Representative (Las Piñas)	Lakas	146,310	92.65%	1st	+8.55	Won
2001	Senator of the Philippines	Independent	11,187,375	37.96%	7th	—N/a	Won
2007	Senator of the Philippines	Nacionalista	15,338,412	52.00%	4th	+14.04	Won
2010	President of the Philippines	Nacionalista	5,573,835	15.42%	3rd	—N/a	Lost

== See also ==
- "Naging Mahirap", Villar's jingle for his 2010 presidential campaign

House of Representatives of the Philippines
Preceded by Filemon Aguilar	Representative, Las Piñas–Muntinlupa's at-large district 1992–1998	District dissolved
New district	Representative, Las Piñas's at-large district 1998–2001	Succeeded by Cynthia Villar
Political offices
Preceded by Jose De Venecia	Speaker of the Philippine House of Representatives; 1998–2000	Succeeded by Arnulfo Fuentebella
Preceded by Blas Ople	President pro tempore of the Senate of the Philippines; 2001–2002	Succeeded by Juan Flavier
Preceded by Franklin Drilon	President of the Senate of the Philippines; 2006–2008	Succeeded by Juan Ponce Enrile
Party political offices
Preceded by Salvador Laurel	President of the Nacionalista Party; 2003–present	Incumbent
Vacant Title last held by Salvador Laurel	Nacionalista Party nominee for President of the Philippines; 2010	Most recent
