= Filemon Aguilar =

Filipino physician and politician

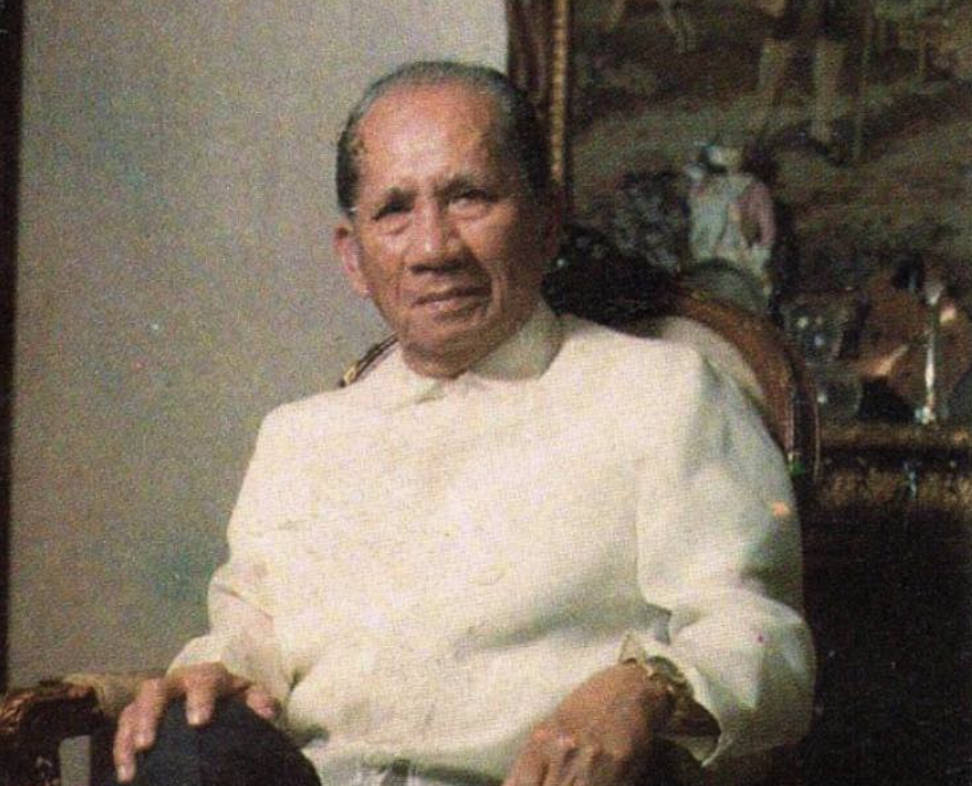

Mayor of Las Piñas
- In office January 1, 1964 – 1986
- Vice Mayor: Padre de la Cruz
- Preceded by: Francisco Antonio
- Succeeded by: Alfredo Juntilla

Member of the Philippine House of Representatives
- In office June 30, 1987 – June 30, 1992
- Preceded by: District created
- Succeeded by: Manny Villar
- Constituency: Las Piñas–Muntinlupa

Personal details
- Born: Filemon Celestino Aguilar Sr. November 22, 1914 Las Piñas, Rizal, Philippine Islands (Note: The Philippines was an unincorporated territory of the United States known as the Philippine Islands at the time of Aguilar's birth.)
- Died: February 14, 1995 (aged 80) Las Piñas, Metro Manila, Philippines
- Party: Independent (c. 1987)
- Other political affiliations: Nacionalista (until 1978); KBL (1978–1986)
- Children: 3 (including Cynthia)
- Profession: Physician

Filemon Celestino Aguilar Sr. (November 22, 1914–February 14, 1995) was a Filipino physician and politician from Las Piñas, Metro Manila, Philippines. He served as Mayor of Las Piñas for more than two decades and later represented the lone district of Las Piñas and Muntinlupa in the House of Representatives of the Philippines during the 8th Congress (1987–1992). He was the patriarch of the Aguilar political family, which has been a dominant force in Las Piñas politics since the 1960s.

== Political career ==
=== Mayor of Las Piñas ===
Aguilar entered politics in the 1960s and served as Mayor of the then-municipality of Las Piñas from 1963 to 1986, one of the longest mayoral tenures in the town's history. Contemporary press coverage recorded his re-election as mayor in the 1967 local elections. He would be re-elected on the same post in 1971 and 1980.

As mayor, he oversaw the development of local public services, including the upgrading of the local district hospital in the mid-1980s.

=== House of Representatives ===
In the 1987 elections, Aguilar was elected to represent the newly created lone district of Las Piñas and Muntinlupa in the House of Representatives, reportedly winning by more than 4,000 votes over his closest rival. He served a single term in the 8th Congress, from June 30, 1987 to June 30, 1992, and was succeeded by his son-in-law Manny Villar.

==== Legislation ====
As a member of the House of Representatives, Aguilar authored bills concerning infrastructure, education, health, and flood control in his district. According to the Senate of the Philippines Legislative Reference Bureau, these included measures providing for:

- the construction of a ten-room school building at Barangay Pilar Village, Las Piñas;
- the conversion of the Las Piñas Municipal High School and Muntinlupa Municipal High School into national high schools;
- the construction of rehabilitation center buildings in Las Piñas and in Muntinlupa;
- the concreting of C.A.A. Road in Las Piñas;
- the conversion of the Las Piñas District Hospital into a 50-bed hospital;
- the completion of Metropolitan Waterworks and Sewerage System distributor pipes in Las Piñas;
- the construction of riprap on both sides of the Las Piñas River; and
- the dredging of major rivers in Las Piñas to prevent flooding.

== Legacy ==
In 1998, Republic Act No. 8714 renamed the Manila South Road, Zapote–Alabang Section, in the cities of Muntinlupa and Las Piñas as "Felimon C. Aguilar Avenue" in his honor, describing him as the late congressman of the lone district of Las Piñas and Muntinlupa. The Act lapsed into law on July 16, 1998.

The Dr. Filemon C. Aguilar Memorial College of Las Piñas City, a tuition-free local college, is named in his honor. It was established in 1998 by his son, then-Mayor Vergel Aguilar, to provide free tertiary education to city residents, and marked its 25th founding anniversary in 2023.

== Personal life ==
Aguilar was the patriarch of a family that became prominent in Las Piñas politics from the 1960s onward.

His son, Filemon "Sonny" Aguilar Jr., was also part of the family's local political presence. He served as a President of the Association of Barangay Captains (ABC) of Las Piñas and later won in 2013 as member of the Sangguniang Panlungsod of Las Piñas.

Another son, Vergel Aguilar, was a property developer before entering public office and later served as Mayor of Las Piñas for several terms.

His daughter, Cynthia Villar, married businessman and politician Manny Villar and was later elected to the Senate of the Philippines.
