= Muntinlupa's at-large congressional district =

Legislative district of the Philippines

- Constituency for the House of Representatives of the Philippines
- Location of Muntinlupa within Metro Manila
- City: Muntinlupa
- Region: Metro Manila
- Population: 543,445 (2020)
- Electorate: 311,750 (2022)
- Area: 39.75 km^{2} (15.35 sq mi)

Current constituency
- Created: 1995
- Representative: Jaime Fresnedi
- Political party: Liberal; 1Munti
- Congressional bloc: Majority

Muntinlupa's at-large congressional district is the sole congressional district of the Philippines in the city of Muntinlupa. It has been represented in the House of Representatives of the Philippines since 1998. Muntinlupa first elected a single representative city-wide at-large for the 11th Congress following its conversion into a highly urbanised city through Republic Act No. 7926 on March 1, 1995. Before 1998, its territory was represented as part of Las Piñas–Muntinlupa, Taguig–Pateros–Muntinlupa, Rizal's 1st and at-large district, and Manila's at-large district. It is currently represented in the 20th Congress by Jaime Fresnedi of the Liberal Party (LP) and One Muntinlupa (1Munti).

== Representation history ==
#	Image	Member	Term of office		Congress	Party	Electoral history
#	Image	Member	Start	End	Congress	Party	Electoral history
=== Muntinlupa's at-large district for the House of Representatives of the Philippines ===
District created March 1, 1995 from Las Piñas–Muntinlupa district.
1		Ignacio Bunye (born 1945)	June 30, 1998	June 30, 2001	11th	Lakas	Elected in 1998.
2		Ruffy Biazon (born 1969)	June 30, 2001	June 30, 2010	12th	LDP	Elected in 2001.
2		Ruffy Biazon (born 1969)	June 30, 2001	June 30, 2010	13th	Liberal	Re-elected in 2004.
2		Ruffy Biazon (born 1969)	June 30, 2001	June 30, 2010	14th	Liberal	Re-elected in 2007.
3		Rodolfo Biazon (1935–2023)	June 30, 2010	June 30, 2016	15th	Liberal	Elected in 2010.
3		Rodolfo Biazon (1935–2023)	June 30, 2010	June 30, 2016	16th	Liberal	Re-elected in 2013.
(2)		Ruffy Biazon (born 1969)	June 30, 2016	June 30, 2022	17th	Liberal	Elected in 2016.
(2)		Ruffy Biazon (born 1969)	June 30, 2016	June 30, 2022	18th	PDP–Laban	Re-elected in 2019.
(2)		Ruffy Biazon (born 1969)	June 30, 2016	June 30, 2022	18th	1Munti	Re-elected in 2019.
4		Jaime Fresnedi (born 1950)	June 30, 2022	Incumbent	19th	Liberal (1Munti)	Elected in 2022.
4		Jaime Fresnedi (born 1950)	June 30, 2022	Incumbent	20th	Liberal (1Munti)	Re-elected in 2025.

== Election results ==
=== 2025 ===
2025 Philippine House of Representatives election
Party	Candidate	Votes	%
Liberal	Jaime Fresnedi	177,504	75.79
PDP–Laban	Silverio Garing	56,710	24.21
Total votes		234,214	100.00
Liberal hold			

=== 2022 ===
2022 Philippine House of Representatives election
Party	Candidate	Votes	%
Liberal	Jaime Fresnedi	183,085	77.71
PDP–Laban	Silverio Garing	52,530	22.29
Total votes		235,615	100.00
Liberal gain from 1Munti			

=== 2019 ===
2019 Philippine House of Representatives election
Party	Candidate	Votes	%
PDP–Laban	Ruffy Biazon	169,756	81.45
UNA	Paeng Arciaga	36,317	17.42
PDDS	Rodolfo Llorca	2,326	1.11
Total votes		208,399	100.00
PDP–Laban hold			

=== 2016 ===
2016 Philippine House of Representatives election
Party	Candidate	Votes	%
Liberal	Ruffy Biazon	135,472	60.36
UNA	Ronnie Ricketts	69,508	30.97
Invalid or blank votes		19,466	8.67
Total votes		224,446	100.00
Liberal hold			

=== 2013 ===
2013 Philippine House of Representatives election
Party	Candidate	Votes	%
Liberal	Rodolfo Biazon	101,113	75.55
NPC	Emerson Espeleta	25,783	19.27
Independent	Santiago Carlos, Jr.	4,020	3.00
Independent	Rafael Burgos	1,671	1.25
Ang Kapatiran	Domingo Tambuatco	1,241	0.93
Total votes		133,828	100.00
Liberal hold			

=== 2010 ===
2010 Philippine House of Representatives election
Party	Candidate	Votes	%
Liberal	Rodolfo Biazon	82,128	46.00
NPC	Dong Puno	48,763	27.31
Independent	Ermie Espeleta	34,644	19.40
Independent	Rey Bulay	9,903	5.55
Independent	Rafael Burgos	2,001	1.12
Bangon Pilipinas	Rodolfo Villoria	934	0.52
Independent	Herminio Sorilla	180	0.10
Valid ballots		177,619	92.82
Invalid or blank votes		13,749	7.18
Total votes		191,368	100.00
Liberal hold			

=== 2004 ===
2004 Philippine House of Representatives election in Muntinlupa
Party	Candidate	Votes	%
Liberal	Ruffy Biazon	93,261	
Lakas	Patricio Boncayao	64,708	
NPC	Jacob Fernandez		
Total votes			
Liberal hold			

== See also ==
- Legislative district of Muntinlupa
