= Las Piñas–Muntinlupa's at-large congressional district =

Las Piñas–Muntinlupa's at-large congressional district was the combined representation of the Metro Manila municipalities (now highly urbanized cities) of Las Piñas and Muntinlupa in the lower house of the Congress of the Philippines (1987–1998), which was created from Las Piñas–Parañaque and Taguig–Pateros–Muntinlupa districts after Parañaque gained separate representation in 1987, with Taguig and Pateros also gained a combined representation in that same year.

Under the new Constitution which was proclaimed on February 11, 1987, the independent Metro Manila municipalities of Las Piñas and Muntinlupa constituted a single congressional district, and elected its member to the restored House of Representatives starting that same year.

The enactment of Republic Act No. 7926 and its subsequent approval by plebiscite on May 8, 1995, converted Muntinlupa into a highly urbanized city. Per Section 62 of Republic Act No. 7926, Muntinlupa and Las Piñas were designated as separate congressional districts, each electing its own representative in the 1998 elections. This separation was further affirmed in the city charter of Las Piñas (Republic Act No. 8251), which was approved by plebiscite on March 26, 1997.

== Representation history ==
| # | Image | Member | Term of office | | Congress | Party | Electoral history |
| # | Image | Member | Start | End | Congress | Party | Electoral history |
|---|---|---|---|---|---|---|---|
=== Las Piñas–Muntinlupa's at-large district for the House of Representatives of the Philippines ===
District created February 2, 1987.
| 1 | | Filemon Aguilar | June 30, 1987 | June 30, 1992 | 8th | Independent | Elected in 1987. |
| 2 | | Manny Villar | June 30, 1992 | June 30, 1998 | 9th | Independent | Elected in 1992. |
| 2 | | Manny Villar | June 30, 1992 | June 30, 1998 | 10th | Lakas | Re-elected in 1995. Redistricted to Las Piñas's at-large district. |
| 2 | | Manny Villar | June 30, 1992 | June 30, 1998 | 10th | LAMMP | Re-elected in 1995. Redistricted to Las Piñas's at-large district. |
District dissolved into Las Piñas and Muntinlupa's at-large districts.
