= Las Piñas's at-large congressional district =

Legislative district of the Philippines

- Constituency for the House of Representatives of the Philippines
- Location of Las Piñas within Metro Manila
- City: Las Piñas
- Region: Metro Manila
- Population: 606,293 (2020)
- Electorate: 318,542 (2025)
- Area: 32.69 km^{2} (12.62 sq mi)

Current constituency
- Created: 1997
- Representative: Mark Anthony Santos
- Political party: NPC
- Congressional bloc: Majority

Las Piñas's at-large congressional district is the sole congressional district of the Philippines in the city of Las Piñas. It has been represented in the House of Representatives of the Philippines since 1998. Las Piñas first elected a single representative city-wide at-large for the 11th Congress following its conversion into a highly urbanised city through Republic Act No. 8251 on February 12, 1997. Before 1997, its territory was represented as part of Las Piñas–Muntinlupa, Las Piñas–Parañaque and Rizal's 1st and at-large district, and Manila's at-large district. It is currently represented in the 20th Congress by Mark Anthony Santos of the Nationalist People's Coalition (NPC).

== Representation history ==
#	Image	Member	Term of office		Congress	Party	Electoral history
#	Image	Member	Start	End	Congress	Party	Electoral history
=== Las Piñas's at-large district for the House of Representatives of the Philippines ===
District created February 12, 1997.
1		Manny Villar	June 30, 1998	June 30, 2001	11th	LAMMP	Redistricted from Las Piñas–Muntinlupa district and re-elected in 1998.
1		Manny Villar	June 30, 1998	June 30, 2001	11th	Independent	Redistricted from Las Piñas–Muntinlupa district and re-elected in 1998.
2		Cynthia Villar	June 30, 2001	June 30, 2010	12th	Independent	Elected in 2001.
2		Cynthia Villar	June 30, 2001	June 30, 2010	13th	Nacionalista	Re-elected in 2004.
2		Cynthia Villar	June 30, 2001	June 30, 2010	14th	Nacionalista	Re-elected in 2007.
3		Mark Villar	June 30, 2010	August 1, 2016	15th	Nacionalista	Elected in 2010.
3		Mark Villar	June 30, 2010	August 1, 2016	16th	Nacionalista	Re-elected in 2013.
3		Mark Villar	June 30, 2010	August 1, 2016	17th	Nacionalista	Re-elected in 2016. Resigned on appointment as Secretary of Public Works and Highways.
—	vacant		August 1, 2016	June 30, 2019	17th	–	No special election held to fill vacancy.
4		Camille Villar	June 30, 2019	June 30, 2025	18th	Nacionalista	Elected in 2019.
4		Camille Villar	June 30, 2019	June 30, 2025	19th	Nacionalista	Re-elected in 2022.
5		Mark Anthony Santos	June 30, 2025	Incumbent	20th	Independent	Elected in 2025.
5		Mark Anthony Santos	June 30, 2025	Incumbent	20th	NPC	Elected in 2025.

== Election results ==
=== 2025 ===
2025 Philippine House of Representatives election in Las Piñas's Lone District
Party	Candidate	Votes	%
Independent	Mark Anthony Santos	109,220	46.75
Nacionalista	Cynthia Villar	79,315	33.95
KANP	Louie Redoble	35,730	15.29
Independent	Barry Tayam	9,359	4.01
Total votes		233,624	100.00
Independent gain from Nacionalista			

=== 2022 ===
2022 Philippine House of Representatives election in Las Piñas's Lone District
Party	Candidate	Votes	%
Nacionalista	Camille Villar	130,812	60.90
Ang Kapatiran	Louie Redoble	65,751	30.61
Independent	Felipe Garduque II	18,249	8.50
Total votes		214,812	100.00
Nacionalista hold			

=== 2019 ===
2019 Philippine House of Representatives election in Las Piñas's Lone District
Party	Candidate	Votes	%
Nacionalista	Camille Villar	173,917	89.78
Independent	Jerry Delos Reyes	19,791	10.22
Total votes		193,708	100.00
Nacionalista hold			

=== 2016 ===
2016 Philippine House of Representatives election in Las Piñas's Lone District
Party	Candidate	Votes	%
Nacionalista	Mark Villar	174,533	86.1
PDP–Laban	Zardi Abellara	23,780	11.7
UNA	Filipino Alvarado	4,509	2.2
Total votes		202,822	100
Nacionalista hold			

=== 2013 ===
2013 Philippine House of Representatives election in Las Piñas's Lone District
Party	Candidate	Votes	%
Nacionalista	Mark Villar	147,884	
Independent	Luis "Louie" Casimiro		
Independent	Filipino Alvarado	2,679	
Total votes			
Nacionalista hold			

=== 2010 ===
2010 Philippine House of Representatives election in Las Piñas's Lone District
Party	Candidate	Votes	%
Nacionalista	Mark Villar	144,977	86.35
KKK	Francisco Antonio Jr.	11,076	6.60
Independent	Zarah Veloria	8,387	5.00
Independent	Filipino Alvarado	3,461	2.06
Valid ballots		167,901	83.37
Invalid or blank votes		33,495	16.63
Total votes		167,901	100.00
Nacionalista hold			

=== 2007 ===
2007 Philippine House of Representatives election in Las Piñas's Lone District
Party	Candidate	Votes	%
Nacionalista	Cynthia Villar	151,780	97.39
KAMPI	Florentino Alumbares	2,445	1.57
Independent	Nestor Buenaflor	1,618	1.04
Total votes		155,843	100.00
Nacionalista hold			

== See also ==
- Legislative districts of Las Piñas

House of Representatives of the Philippines
Preceded by Pangasinan's 4th congressional district	Home district of the speaker July 27, 1998 – November 13, 2000	Succeeded by Camarines Sur's 3rd congressional district
