= Legislative districts of Las Piñas =

Legislative district of the Philippines

The legislative districts of Las Piñas are the representations of the highly urbanized city of Las Piñas in the Congress of the Philippines. The city is currently represented in the lower house of the Congress through its lone congressional district.

== History ==
Las Piñas was represented as part of the at-large district of the province of Manila in the Malolos Congress from 1898 to 1899, the first district of Rizal from 1907 to 1941 and from 1945 to 1972, the at-large district of Rizal in the National Assembly of the Second Philippine Republic from 1943 to 1944, and the representation of Region IV in the Interim Batasang Pambansa from 1978 to 1984. It was later grouped with Parañaque (as the district of Las Piñas–Parañaque) from 1984 to 1986 for representation in the Regular Batasang Pambansa. In 1987, it was grouped with Muntinlupa to form the district of Las Piñas–Muntinlupa. Las Piñas first elected its own representative in 1998, after the city charter of Muntinlupa (Republic Act No. 7926), approved on March 1, 1995, and ratified on May 8, 1995, separated the two. This separation was confirmed by the city's own city charter (Republic Act No. 8251), approved on February 2, 1997, and ratified on March 26, 1997.

== Current districts and representatives ==
NPC (1)

Legislative Districts and Congressional Representatives of Las Piñas City
District	Current Representative	Barangays	Population (2020)
Lone	Mark Anthony Santos (since 2025); Elias Aldana	List: Almanza Uno; Almanza Dos; C.A.A. - BF International; Daniel Fajardo; Elias Aldana; Ilaya; Manuyo Uno; Manuyo Dos; Pamplona Uno; Pamplona Dos; Pamplona Tres; Pilar Village; Pulang Lupa Uno; Pulang Lupa Dos; Talon Uno; Talon Dos; Talon Tres; Talon Kuatro; Talon Singko; Zapote	606,293

== See also ==
- Legislative districts of Rizal
- Legislative district of Las Piñas–Muntinlupa
- Legislative district of Las Piñas–Parañaque
