= Camille Villar =

Senator of the Philippines since 2025 (born 1985)

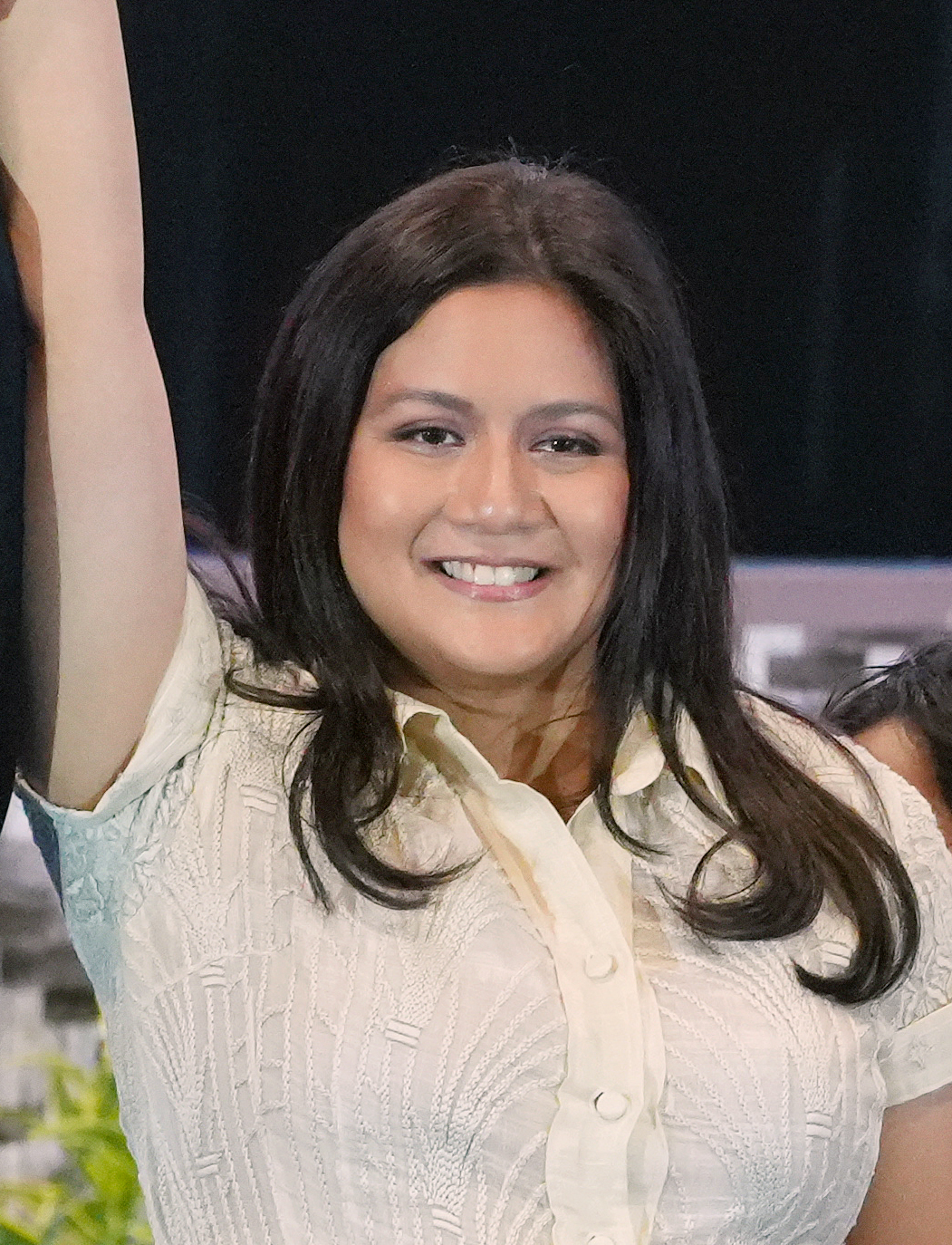
- Villar in 2025

Senator of the Philippines
- Incumbent
- Assumed office June 30, 2025

Deputy Speaker of the House of Representatives of the Philippines
- In office July 25, 2022 – June 30, 2025
- Speaker: Martin Romualdez
- In office February 2, 2021 – June 1, 2022
- Speaker: Lord Allan Velasco

Member of the Philippine House of Representatives from Las Piñas's at-large district
- In office June 30, 2019 – June 30, 2025
- Preceded by: Mark Villar
- Succeeded by: Mark Anthony Santos

Personal details
- Born: Camille Aguilar Villar; January 25, 1985 (age 41) Mandaluyong, Philippines
- Party: Nacionalista (2018–present)
- Spouse: Erwin Genuino (m. 2012)
- Children: 3
- Parents: Manny Villar (father); Cynthia Villar (mother)
- Relatives: Mark Villar (brother); Imelda Aguilar (aunt)
- Education: Ateneo de Manila University (BS); IESE Business School (G-EMBA)
- Occupation: Broadcaster; politician

Camille Aguilar Villar-Genuino (born January 25, 1985) is a Filipino politician who has served as a senator of the Philippines since 2025. She previously served as the representative for Las Piñas's at-large district from 2019 to 2025 and as deputy speaker from 2022 to 2025, having previously held the position from 2021 to 2022. She is the youngest senator of the 20th Congress.

== Early life and education ==
Camille Villar was born in Mandaluyong, Metro Manila, on January 25, 1985. She is the youngest child and only daughter of former President of the Senate Manny Villar and former senator Cynthia Villar. One of her older brothers, Mark Villar, is another incumbent senator.

Villar graduated with a bachelor's degree business management at the Ateneo de Manila University. She then obtained a master's degree at the IESE Business School in Barcelona, Spain.

== Business career ==
Villar formerly served as COO of Brittany Corporation, a subsidiary of Vista Land. She was the youngest person to hold the position. She is also the managing director of Vista Land.

Villar is the main endorser of television network All TV.

== Political career ==
=== House of Representatives (2019–2025) ===
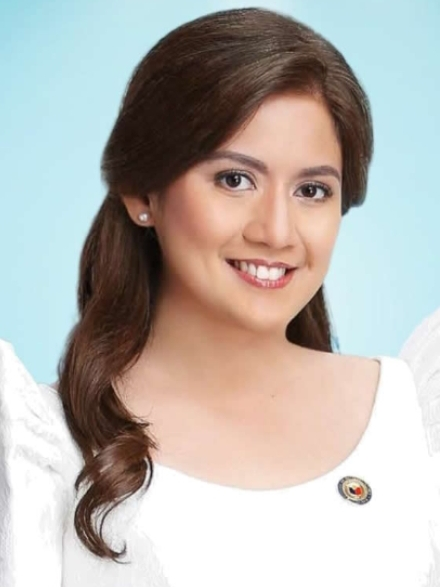
Portrait of Villar during her term as Las Piñas representative in the 19th Congress

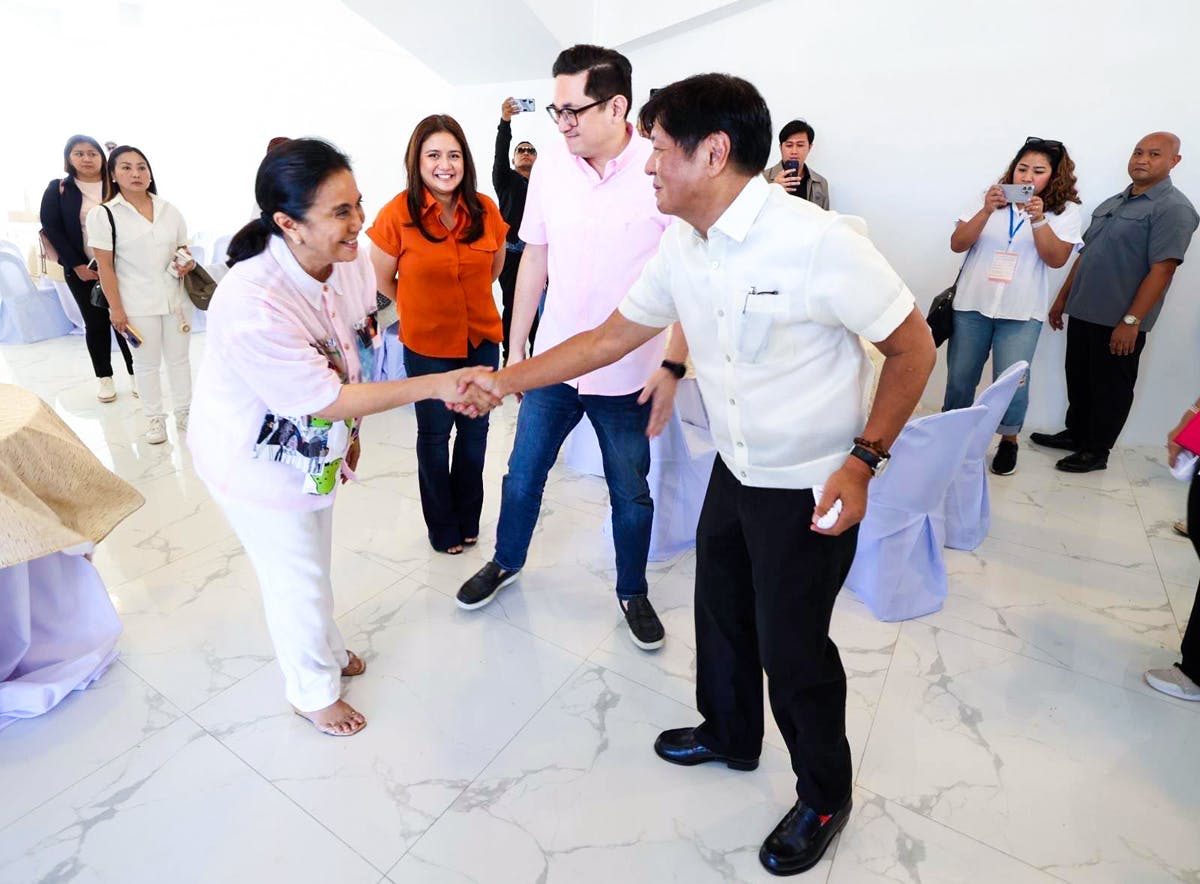
Villar (in orange) with President Bongbong Marcos, former vice president and Naga mayor Leni Robredo, and senator Bam Aquino

In the 2019 election, Villar contested a seat at the House of Representatives as the Nacionalista candidate for Las Piñas's at-large congressional district. She received 89.78% (173,917 votes), defeating her competitor Jerry de los Reyes.

On November 18, 2020, Villar was elected one of the Deputy Speakers of the House of Representatives, but refused the position just after a few hours. However, she was again elected to the same position on February 2, 2021; this time she accepted it.

On July 10, 2020, Villar was among the 70 representatives who voted to deny the renewal of the broadcasting franchise of ABS-CBN.

She was re-elected to her second term as representative in 2022. She once again became one of the Deputy Speakers for the 19th Congress.

On February 5, 2025, Villar was one of the 91 representatives who didn't sign the impeachment complaint against Sara Duterte.

On April 22 and 24, 2025, Commission on Elections (COMELEC) Kontra Bigay committee issued show cause orders against Villar and some local candidates over alleged vote buying activities surrounding their campaign. Villar responded in April 25 that the incident happened on February 9, 2025, during an All TV event in Barangay Buhay na Tubig in Imus, Cavite, two days before the campaigning period. Villar also denied any vote-buying during the promotional event and added that she was invited as a guest. In May 7, the Kontra Bigay committee accepted the explanation and noted insufficient for filing a complaint.

=== Senator (2025–present) ===
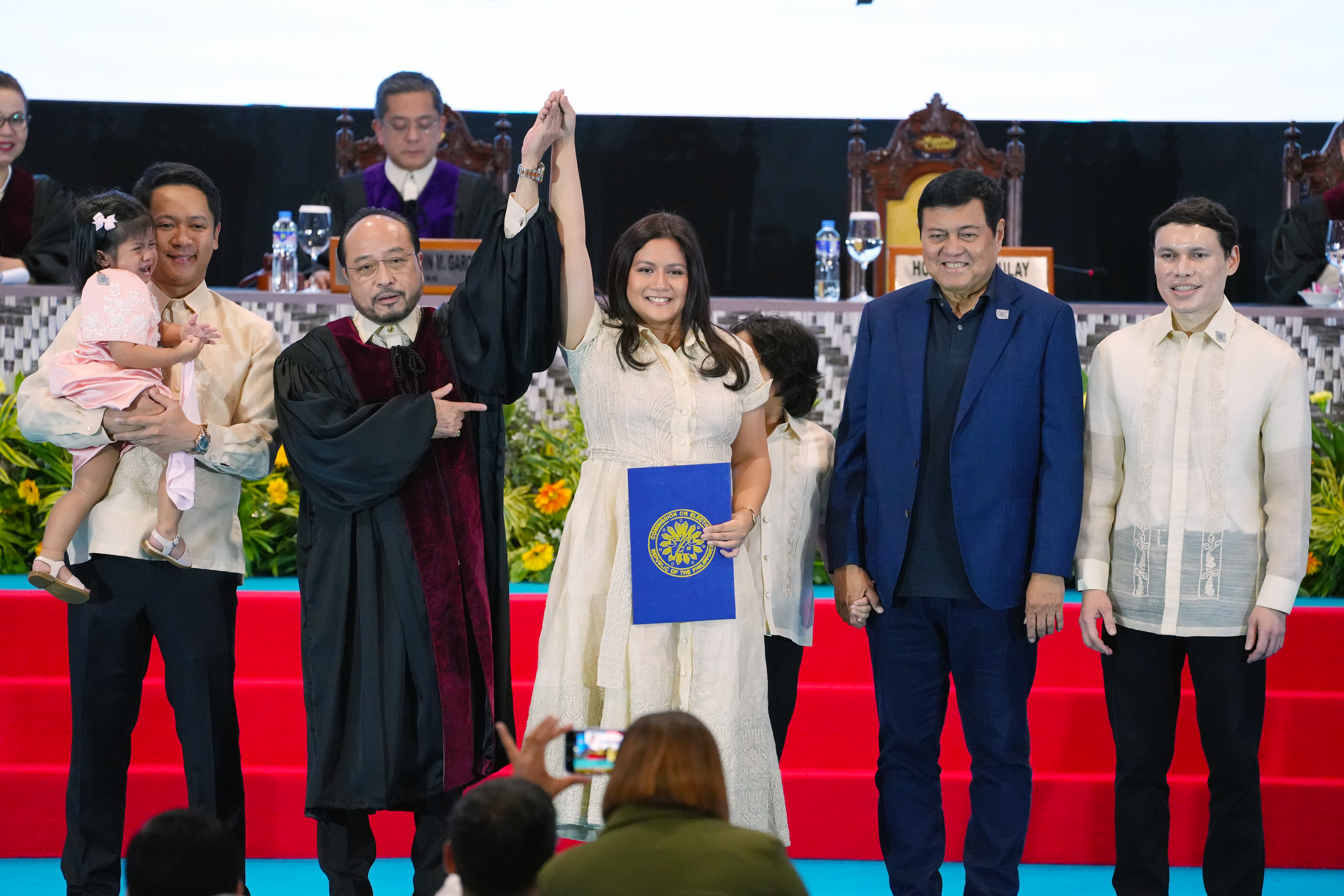
Villar (center) with her father Manny Villar (2nd from right), brother Manuel Paolo Villar III (right), husband Erwin Genuino (left) and children during her proclamation as a senator-elect on May 17, 2025

Villar ran for senator in the 2025 election, having filed her certificate of candidacy on October 4, 2024. She pledged for "new politics" as the only millennial candidate for senator in the Villar political family. She was included in the Alyansa para sa Bagong Pilipinas slate by incumbent President Bongbong Marcos. Villar was endorsed by Vice President Sara Duterte, and the two appeared on a television advertisement citing the long-time friendship between their respective political families. After being adopted by the Partido Demokratiko Pilipino (PDP) as a guest candidate in the DuterTen slate, Villar placed tenth and won one of the twelve contested seats. Villar was the top spender among the senatorial candidates, having spent ₱179.6 million in the 2025 campaign, after ranking precariously in pre-election surveys.

Villar joined her brother Mark in the Senate, as their mother Cynthia has left the Senate due to being term-limited. She was among the 20 senators who voted to archive the articles of impeachment against Vice President Sara Duterte.

In January 2026, the Securities and Exchange Commission filed a complaint with the Department of Justice charging Villar Land, its officers and related entities for alleged market manipulation, insider trading and misleading disclosures that distorted the company’s share prices. Among the accused are directors Manny Villar as Villar Land chair; wife Cynthia Villar; their children Paolo Villar, Mark Villar and Camille Villar; directors Cynthia Javarez, Ana Marie Pagsibigan and Garth Castañeda; and company Infra Holdings Corp. and MGS Construction. Camille is additionally accused of insider trading for buying 73,600 Villar Land shares in December 2017, before a corporate disclosure that resulted in a jump in the company's share price.

In June 2026, the Office of the Ombudsman initiated a graft investigation into allegations that Senator Camille Villar and her brother, Senator Mark Villar, improperly interfered with the execution of Phase 2 and Phase 3 of the Light Rail Transit Line 1 Cavite Extension project. Investigators are examining claims that corporate and political influence was utilized to shift the original railway alignment from Sucat, Parañaque, toward the C5 Road corridor in Las Piñas to financially optimize commercial real estate developments owned by the Villar family. Parallel legislative oversight reports led by local lawmakers noted that construction remains stalled due to an unsigned Right of Way Usage Agreement involving Villar affiliated firms like Fine Properties Inc. and Villar Land Holdings, Inc. where Villar previously held administrative and directorial roles. Camille Villar has issued a total denial of the accusations, stating that she has had zero participation, intervention, or presence in any discussion, deliberation, or meeting regarding the LRT1 extension project in either her personal capacity or her capacity as a legislator, while further stating that she welcomes an impartial investigation to establish her adherence to public service duties.

== Television ==
Villar appeared as a guest host for Wil Time Bigtime for a week in 2011 in lieu of Mariel Rodriguez who went on vacation. Wil Time has Willie Revillame, a family friend of the Villars, as the main host. In January 2012, Villar became a regular co-host of Will Time-Bigtime serving the role until the variety show ended in 2013. She was also one of the hosts of Wowowillie in 2013.

== Personal life ==
Villar married Erwin Genuino, son of former PAGCOR chair Efraim Genuino and 2010 Makati mayoral candidate, in 2012. They have three children. She is also the niece of former Mayor of Las Piñas Vergel Aguilar, who was married to incumbent vice mayor Imelda Aguilar, as well as having a longtime friendship with the family of Romeo Jalosjos Sr., fellow Nacionalista Party politicians and chairman of Television and Production Exponents (TAPE) Inc., the former producer of the longest-running noontime variety show Eat Bulaga!, and its successor, Tahanang Pinakamasaya.

== Electoral history ==
Electoral history of Camille Villar
Year	Office	Party	Votes received				Result
Year	Office	Party	Total	%	P.	Swing	Result
2019	Representative (Las Piñas)	Nacionalista	173,917	89.78%	1st	—N/a	Won
2022	Representative (Las Piñas)	Nacionalista	130,812	60.90%	1st	-28.88	Won
2025	Senator of the Philippines	Nacionalista	13,651,274	23.80%	10th	—N/a	Won
