= Mark Villar =

Senator of the Philippines since 2022 and businessman (born 1978)

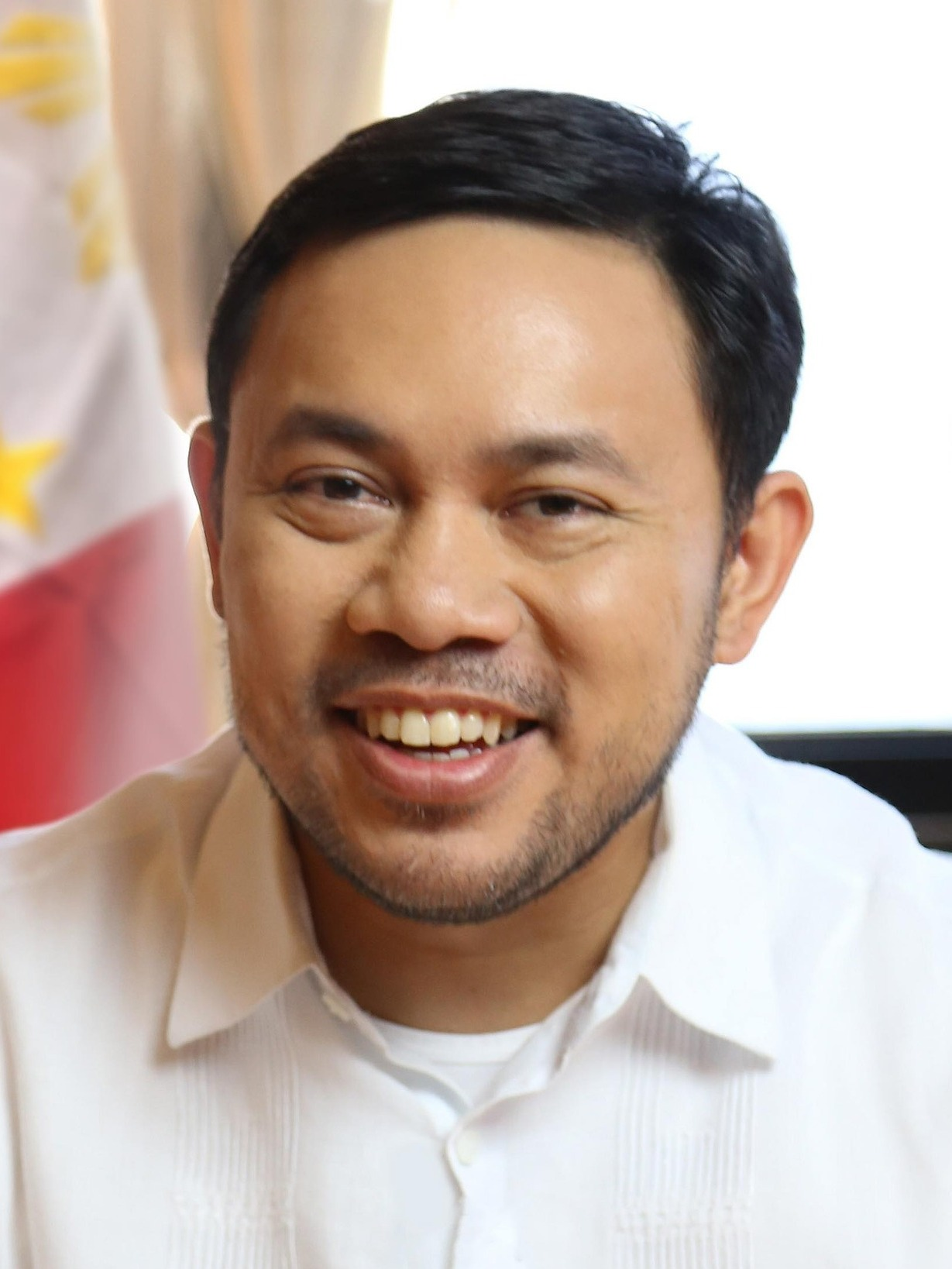
- Official portrait, 2022

Senator of the Philippines
- Incumbent
- Assumed office June 30, 2022

Senate Deputy Majority Leader
- In office August 2, 2022 – June 30, 2025 Serving with JV Ejercito
- Leader: Joel Villanueva; Francis Tolentino

Chair of the Senate Banks, Financial Institutions and Currencies Committee
- In office July 25, 2022 – June 30, 2025
- Preceded by: Grace Poe

Chair of the Senate Trade, Commerce and Entrepreneurship Committee
- In office July 25, 2022 – June 30, 2025
- Preceded by: Koko Pimentel

IATF-EID Isolation Czar
- In office March 16, 2020 – October 6, 2021
- President: Rodrigo Duterte

Secretary of Public Works and Highways
- In office August 1, 2016 – October 6, 2021
- President: Rodrigo Duterte
- Preceded by: Rafael Yabut (acting)
- Succeeded by: Roger Mercado (acting)

Member of the Philippine House of Representatives from Las Piñas
- In office June 30, 2010 – August 1, 2016
- Preceded by: Cynthia Villar
- Succeeded by: Camille Villar (Note: Villar's wife, DIWA Partylist Representative Emmeline Aglipay-Villar, was appointed as "caretaker" representative of Las Piñas on August 2, 2016, following his resignation to become the Secretary of Public Works and Highways. He was eventually succeeded by his sister Camille, who was elected in 2019.)

Personal details
- Born: Mark Aguilar Villar; August 14, 1978 (age 48) Las Piñas, Philippines
- Party: Nacionalista (2009–present)
- Spouse: Emmeline Yan Aglipay
- Children: 1
- Parent(s): Manny Villar; Cynthia Villar
- Relatives: Camille Villar (sister); Imelda Aguilar (aunt-by-marriage); Edgar Aglipay (father-in-law)
- Education: University of Pennsylvania (BA); University of Chicago (MBA)
- Occupation: Politician
- Profession: Businessman
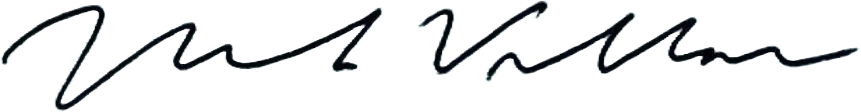
- Signature

Mark Aguilar Villar (Tagalog pronunciation: [vilˈjaɾ], born August 14, 1978) is a Filipino politician and businessman serving as a Senator since 2022. He served in President Rodrigo Duterte's cabinet as the Secretary of Public Works and Highways from 2016 to 2021, and was the COVID-19 pandemic isolation czar from 2020 to 2021. A member of the Nacionalista Party, he was the Representative of Las Piñas from 2010 to 2016. Villar has also previously held executive positions in his family's businesses.

Villar hails from a political dynasty based in Las Piñas. His mother Cynthia and his sister Camille are respectively his former and current colleagues in the Senate, while his father, Manny, is a businessman and former Senate President. His wife, Emmeline, is also a politician.

== Early life ==
Villar was born on August 14, 1978, to businesspersons Manny and Cynthia Villar (née Aguilar). He is the second of three children, with an older brother, Manuel Paolo, and a younger sister, Camille Lydia. He attended the International School Manila in Makati, Metro Manila before moving to the United States to pursue higher education. He earned his bachelor's degree in Economics, Political Science and Philosophy from the University of Pennsylvania. He also finished his master's degree in Business Administration from the University of Chicago Booth School of Business.

== Business career ==
On his return to the Philippines, he worked for ten years in the family's real estate business. By 2003, Villar ran the M-Star malls after their ownership was transferred from Manuela Corp. to the Villar family. He was President of Crown Asia Corporation before becoming managing director of Vista Land & Lifescapes. When asked regarding his potential involvement in politics, Villar stated that he preferred corporate work to political work.

== Political career ==
=== House of Representatives (2010–2016) ===
Villar was first elected to public office in 2010 as congressman of the lone district of Las Piñas, succeeding his mother, Cynthia Villar, a three-term representative who later became senator. During his term, he served as Chairman of the House Committee on Trade and Industry, as well as Vice Chairman of the House Committees on Overseas Workers Affairs, Labor and Employment, and Science and Technology.

As a member of the 15th and 16th Congress, he authored several bills on education, health and livelihood, including the Negosyo Act promoting microfinance and the Lemon Law protecting buyers of motor vehicles. He was also one of the proponents of the Co-Loading Act which opened domestic transport and shipping to foreign vessels.

=== Secretary of Public Works and Highways (2016–2021) ===
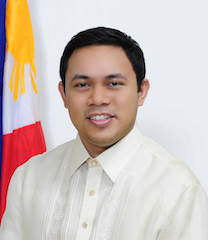
Villar as secretary of the Department of Public Works and Highways

Villar ran for a third term during the 2016 elections and won. However, he resigned from Congress on August 1, 2016 to become Secretary of Public Works and Highways, after being appointed by President Rodrigo Duterte before he took office on June 30. At 38 years old, Villar was the youngest—and wealthiest—Duterte cabinet member. Pending a special election to be held in Las Piñas to fill in Villar's seat in the lower house, House Speaker Pantaleon Alvarez designated Villar's wife, former DIWA Partylist representative Emmeline Aglipay-Villar, as interim representative. Aglipay-Villar later became an undersecretary of the Department of Justice and was part of the team that reviewed the water concession agreements of Maynilad Water Services and Manila Water. However, the special election was never held up to the end of the 17th Congress.

During his time as secretary, the Department of Public Works and Highways (DPWH) completed a total of 29,264 km (18,184 mi) of roads, 5,950 bridges, 11,340 flood control projects, 222 evacuation centers, 133 Tatag ng Imprastraktura Para sa Kapayapaan at Seguridad (Tikas) projects, and 150,149 classrooms, while generating 6.5 million jobs, according to Villar. These projects were part of the Build! Build! Build! program of the Duterte administration.

=== Senate of the Philippines (2022–present) ===
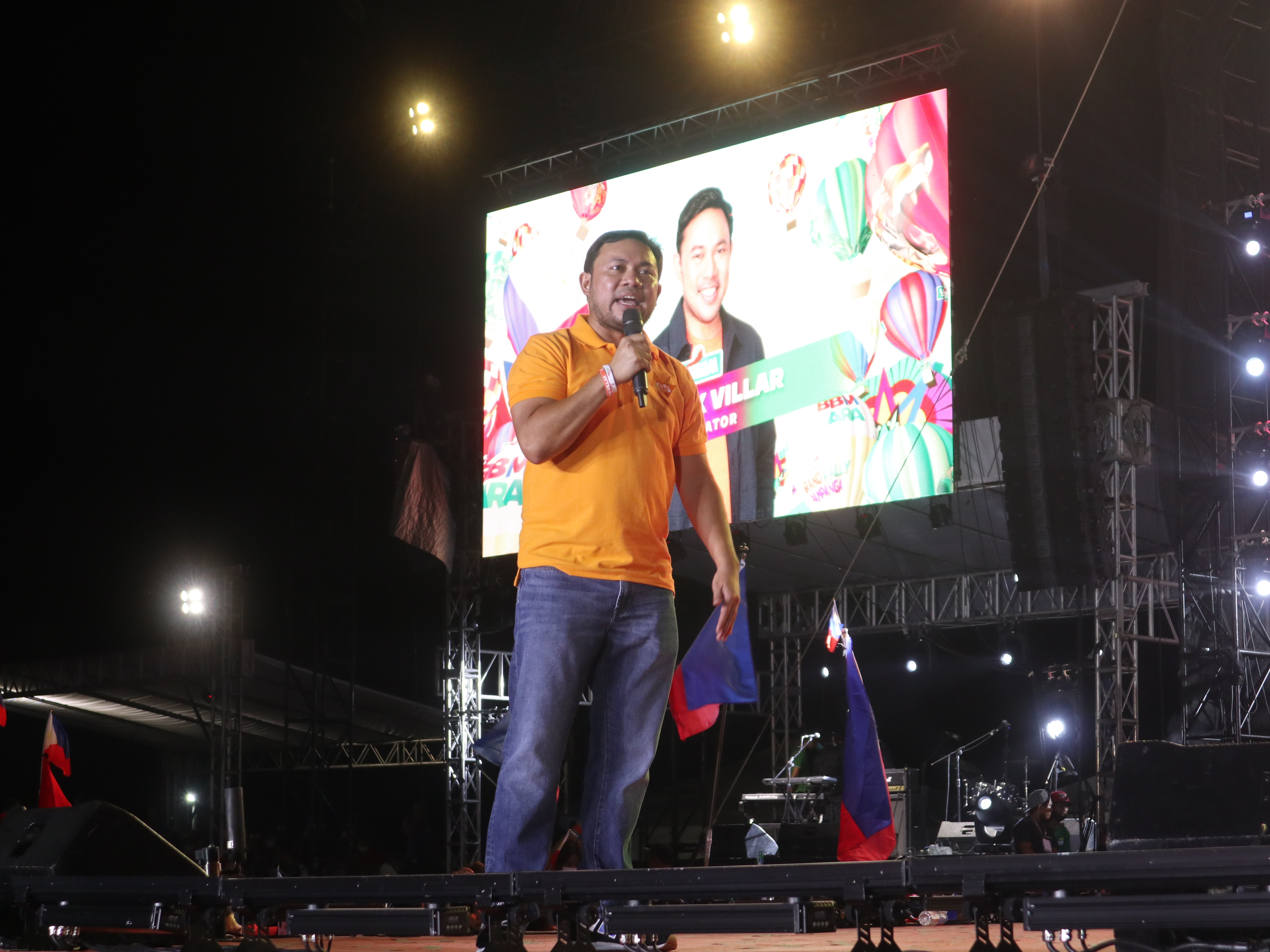
Villar speaking during a Uniteam Alliance campaign rally in San Fernando, Pampanga in 2022

Villar resigned as Secretary of Public Works and Highways effective October 6, 2021. On the same day, he filed his certificate of candidacy (COC) to run for senator in 2022. His candidacy is endorsed by President Duterte. He was named to the senatorial slate of UniTeam, having been endorsed by the tandem of Bongbong Marcos and Sara Duterte. He won in his first senatorial bid, ranking 6th out of the 12 winning senatorial bets with more than 19 million votes. He and his mother Cynthia Villar became the first mother-and-son tandem as incumbent senators since Loi Ejercito and Jinggoy Estrada in the 13th Congress (2004–2007). Villar was elected as a Senate Deputy Majority Leader (alongside JV Ejercito) and the Chairman of the Senate Committee on Banks, Financial Institutions and Currencies and the Senate Committee on Trade, Commerce and Entrepreneurship.

Villar was the youngest member of the Senate during the 19th Congress. As senator, he sponsored the Maharlika Investment Fund Bill, which was approved by a majority vote.

== Controversies ==
=== DPWH corruption allegations ===
The Department of Public Works and Highways under Villar faced controversy when Senator Panfilo Lacson flagged ₱469 billion worth of DPWH infrastructure projects that had already been financed by the government for implementation in 2020 but were funded again for 2021. President Rodrigo Duterte defended Villar for not being involved in the issue, saying that he is already rich. Villar's wife, DOJ undersecretary Emmeline Aglipay-Villar, said she would not participate in DOJ investigations into the DPWH. Villar formed a task force that led to relieving 14 personnel due to corruption.

=== Business controversies ===
As of 2023, the top 5 tax delinquent businesses in Las Piñas are owned by Villar's family. Las Piñas Mayor Imelda Aguilar, sister-in-law of Sen. Cynthia Villar, endorsed a waiver for the tax penalties. The endorsement was submitted to her daughter, Vice Mayor April Aguilar-Nery.

In May 2025, the Local Water Utilities Administration (LWUA) began investigating then-Villar-owned PrimeWater over its alleged poor services and high cost leading to an order by President Bongbong Marcos. The investigation also examined alleged conflicts of interest involving Mark Villar, who was the Secretary of Public Works and Highways when PrimeWater's joint venture agreements (JVAs) significantly expanded in 2019 while LWUA was attached to the department. Villar later denied the accusations.

In January 2026, the Securities and Exchange Commission filed a complaint with the Department of Justice charging Villar Land, its officers and related entities for alleged market manipulation, insider trading and misleading disclosures that distorted the company’s share prices. Among the accused are directors Manny Villar as Villar Land chair; wife Cynthia Villar; their children Paolo Villar, Mark Villar and Camille Villar; directors Cynthia Javarez, Ana Marie Pagsibigan and Garth Castañeda; and company Infra Holdings Corp. and MGS Construction.

=== Flood control project scandal ===
Amid the 2025 flood control corruption scandal, Justice Secretary Jesus Crispin Remulla said that the Department of Justice was investigating possible family ties between Mark Villar and a government contractor. Bilyonaryo News Channel previously reported that I&E Construction, linked to Villar's cousin Carlo Aguilar, received government contracts worth ₱18.5 billion. Villar denied impropriety in the infrastructure contracts awarded to I&E during his tenure as DPWH secretary.

An investigative report by Rappler said that Motiontrade Development Corporation, owned by Villar's uncle Christian Aguilar, secured ₱390 million in flood control projects in 2023 and 2024 and ₱2.8 billion in public infrastructure projects from 2023 to 2025. In November 2025, the Office of the Ombudsman said that it was investigating alleged corruption in flood control projects that may have benefited the Villar family's property businesses.

In November 2025, former DPWH undersecretary Roberto Bernardo alleged that Mark Villar, Manuel Bonoan, and Cathy Cabral ran a kickback scheme at the DPWH. Cabral, under Villar or Bonoan, made additions or insertions to the proposed national budget to ensure which projects get funded. Bernardo alleged that he delivered Mark Villar's 10% kickback to Carlo Aguilar, Motionatrade co-owner and Villar's cousin.

=== LRT Line 1 Cavite Extension right-of-way dispute ===
In June 2026, the Office of the Ombudsman initiated a graft investigation into allegations that Senator Mark Villar and his sister, Senator Camille Villar, improperly interfered with the execution of Phase 2 and Phase 3 of the Light Rail Transit Line 1 Cavite Extension project. Investigators are reviewing claims that political and corporate pressure was exerted to realign the railway layout away from Dr. Santos Avenue, Parañaque, toward the C-5 Road corridor in Las Piñas to financially benefit commercial real estate developments owned by the Villar family. In parallel legislative oversight proceedings, Las Piñas Representative Mark Anthony Santos and the Light Rail Transit Authority noted that construction on the Las Piñas and Zapote stations remained stalled because a critical Right of Way Usage Agreement had not been signed by Villar affiliated entities like Fine Properties Inc. and Villar Land Holdings, Inc. despite bilateral negotiations spanning from 2021 to 2025. Additionally, state transport officials reported that the C-5–Quirino Flyover, constructed during Villar tenure as the Secretary of Public Works and Highways, physically obstructed the original railway pathing. Villar has vehemently denied all accusations of blocking the infrastructure network or using his public position for personal gain, stating that his track record is clean, he welcomes any legitimate probe, and his family corporate affiliates actively proposed donating the required private land parcels for free while simply awaiting government due diligence to finalize the review process.

== Personal life ==
Villar is married to a fellow lawmaker, Emmeline Yan Aglipay, daughter of Cagayan Governor Edgar Aglipay and a former undersecretary at the Department of Justice whom he met during the 15th Congress. They have a daughter, Emma Therese.

On July 15, 2020, Villar tested positive for COVID-19. He was able to recover from the disease.

Villar also has a longtime friendship with Bullet Jalosjos, fellow Nacionalista Party politicians, treasurer and spokesperson of Television and Production Exponents (TAPE) Inc., the former producer of the longest-running noontime variety show Eat Bulaga!, and its successor, Tahanang Pinakamasaya.

== Electoral history ==
Electoral history of Mark Villar
Year	Office	Party	Votes received				Result
Year	Office	Party	Total	%	P.	Swing	Result
2010	Representative (Las Piñas at-large)	Nacionalista	155,343	86.39%	1st	—N/a	Won
2013	Representative (Las Piñas at-large)	Nacionalista	148,805	—N/a	1st	—N/a	Won
2016	Representative (Las Piñas at-large)	Nacionalista	174,533	86.05%	1st	—N/a	Won
2022	Senator of the Philippines	Nacionalista	19,475,592	35.06%	6th	—N/a	Won

== Notes ==
House of Representatives of the Philippines
Preceded by Cynthia Villar	Representative, Lone District of Las Piñas; 2010–2016	Vacant Title next held by Camille Villar
Political offices
Preceded by Rafael Yabut; Acting	Secretary of Public Works and Highways; 2016–2021	Succeeded by Roger Mercado; Acting
New title	IATF-EID Isolation Czar; 2020–2021	Vacant
