= Mayor of Las Piñas =

Head of local government of Las Piñas, Metro Manila, Philippines

- Punong Lungsod ng Las Pinas
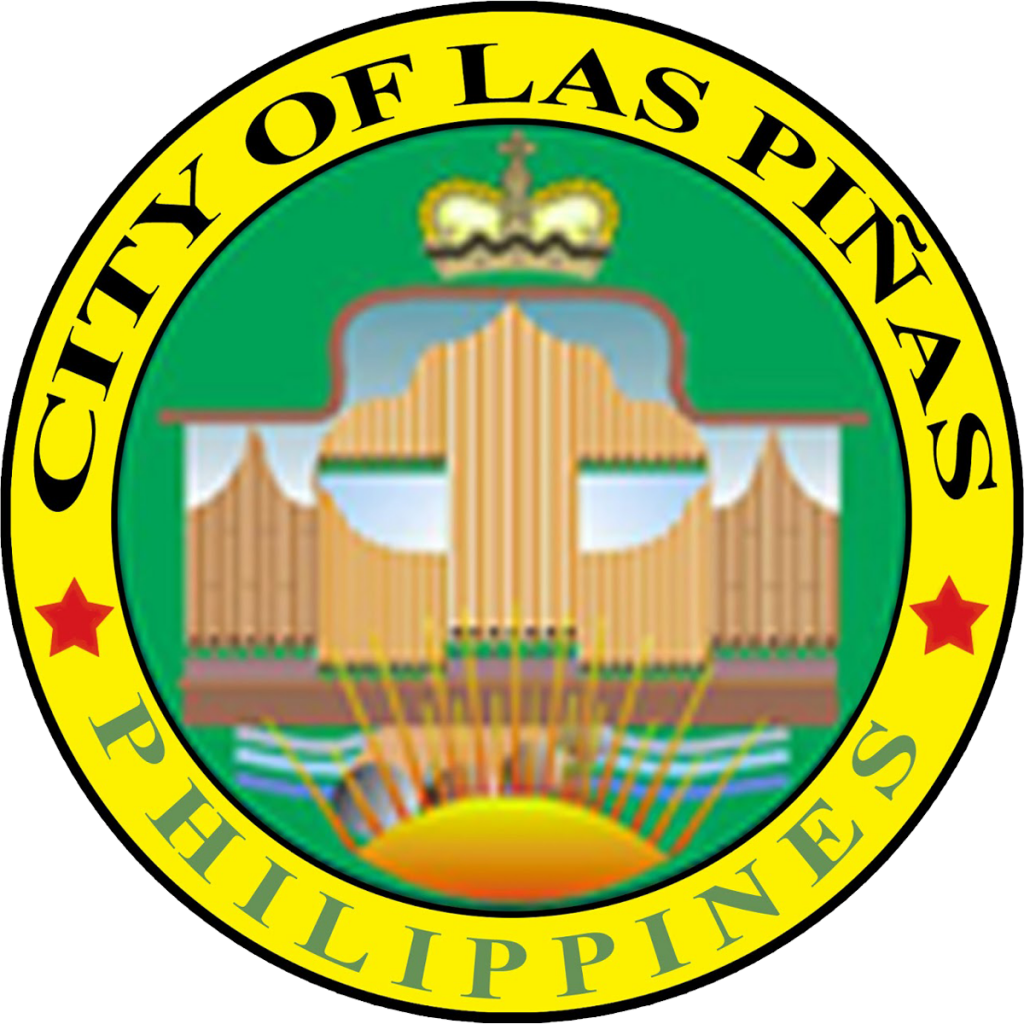
- Seal of Las Piñas
- Incumbent; April Aguilar-Nery since June 30, 2025
- Residence: Las Piñas City Hall; Alabang-Zapote Road, Brgy. Pamplona III, Las Piñas City
- Appointer: Elected via popular vote
- Term length: 3 years
- Formation: 1908
- First holder: Juan Tiongkiao
- Succession: Vice Mayor of Las Pinas
- Deputy: Vice Mayor Imelda Aguilar

The Mayor of Las Piñas City (Filipino: Punong Lungsod ng Las Piñas) is the head of the executive branch of the Las Piñas government and the chief executive of Las Pinas. The mayor's office administers all city services, public property, police and fire protection, and most public agencies, and enforces all city laws within the boundaries of Las Pinas.

The mayor holds office at the Las Piñas City Hall. The mayor appoints numerous officials, including the vice mayor and the commissioners who head city agencies and departments.

Like all local government heads in the Philippines, the mayor is elected via popular vote. He may not be elected for a fourth consecutive term (although the former mayor may return to office after one term). In case of death, resignation, or incapacity, the vice mayor becomes the mayor.

The current mayor is April Aguilar-Nery who was elected on June 30, 2025.

== List of Mayors of Las Pinas ==
No.	Image	Name	Party	Term	Deputy (later Vice Mayor)	Term Began	Term Ended
		Municipal Mayor of Las Piñas					
1		Juan Tiongkiao				1908	1913
2		Mariano Santos				1913	1916
3		Rufino De Leon				1916	1918
4		Manuel Arevalo				1918	1922
5		Clemente Dalandan				1922	1925
6		Elias Aldana			Simon Tolentino	1925	1934
7		Eugenio Trinidad			Pablo de Leon	1935	1937
8		Bernardo Aldana				1938	1946
9		Eugenio Trinidad				1947	1951
10		Pedro Dela Cruz				1952	1959
11		Francisco Antonio				1959	December 31, 1963
12		Filemon C. Aguilar	Nacionalista (until 1978); KBL (from 1978)		Padre de la Cruz	January 1, 1964	1986
13		Alfredo Juntilla			Remigio Santos; Lolita Castillo	1986^{[a]}	December 1, 1987
14		Lydia Castillo				December 5, 1987^{[a]}	February 2, 1988
15		Rosalino Riguera	Independent		Eduardo Castillo	February 2, 1988	June 30, 1992
16		Gabriel Casimiro	Lakas		Vergel A. Aguilar	June 30, 1992	June 30, 1995
17		Vergel A. Aguilar	Independent		Antonio L. Tamayo	June 30, 1995	March 26, 1997
		Mayor of Las Piñas					
18		Vergel A. Aguilar	Independent	1998; 2001	Antonio L. Tamayo; Luis Bustamante	March 26, 1997	June 30, 2004
19		Imelda Aguilar	Independent	2004	Luis Bustamante	June 30, 2004	June 30, 2007
20		Vergel A. Aguilar	Nacionalista	2007; 2010; 2013	Henry Medina; Luis Bustamante	June 30, 2007	June 30, 2016
21		Imelda Aguilar	Nacionalista (until 2018, 2021–2024); NPC (2018–2021, from 2024)	2016; 2019; 2022	Luis Bustamante; April Aguilar-Nery	June 30, 2016	June 30, 2025
22		April Aguilar-Nery	NPC	2025	Imelda Aguilar	June 30, 2025	Present

^{a} Served in an acting capacity.
