= 2025 Las Piñas local elections =

Part of the 2025 Philippine general election

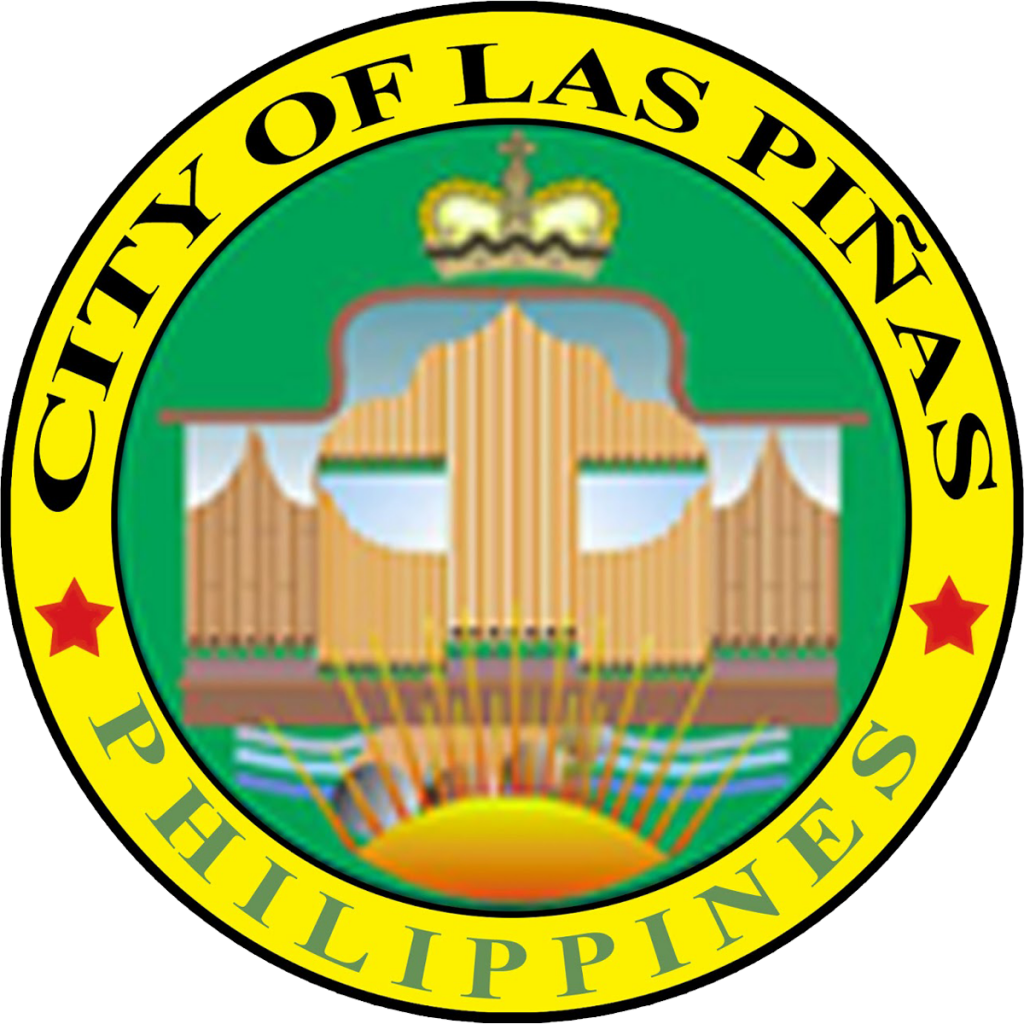
- May 12, 2025
- Turnout: 80.20%
- Mayoral election
Candidate	April Aguilar-Nery	Carlo Aguilar
Party	NPC	Nacionalista
Alliance	Team Aguilar	Tropang Villar
Running mate	Imelda Aguilar	Luis Bustamante
Popular vote	117,800	80,880
Percentage	48.55%	33.33%
Candidate	Emerito "Rey" Rivera	Armando Ducat Jr.
Party	Independent	Independent
Alliance	Team Pagbabago	Team Ducat
Running mate	Luis Casimiro	Edilberto "Ed" Angeles
Popular vote	25,205	10,548
Percentage	10.39%	4.35%
Mayor before election
Imelda Aguilar
Nacionalista
Elected mayor
April Aguilar-Nery
NPC
- Vice mayoral election
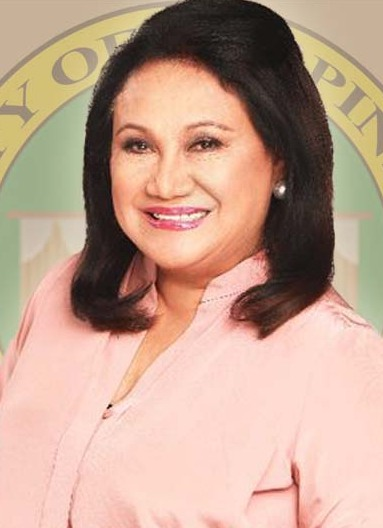
Candidate	Imelda Aguilar	Luis Bustamante
Party	NPC	Nacionalista
Alliance	Team Aguilar	Tropang Villar
Popular vote	123,622	68,058
Percentage	51.98%	28.62%
Candidate	Luis Casimiro	Edilberto "Ed" Angeles
Party	Independent	Independent
Alliance	Team Pagbabago	Team Ducat
Popular vote	24,907	11,305
Percentage	10.47%	4.75%
Vice Mayor before election
April Aguilar-Nery
NPC
Elected Vice Mayor
Imelda Aguilar
NPC

Local elections were held in Las Piñas on Monday, May 12, 2025, as part of the 2025 Philippine general election. The electorate will elect a mayor, a vice mayor, twelve members of the Las Piñas City Council, and one representative to the House of Representatives of the Philippines. The officials elected in the election will assume their respective offices on June 30, 2025, for a three-year-long term.

== Background ==
The politics of Las Piñas has been dominated by the Aguilar family since the 1960s starting with the family patriarch, former mayor Filemon C. Aguilar. After his death, the mayoralty of the city passed on to his son, Vergel Aguilar, and eventually to his wife, incumbent Imelda Aguilar. Vergel's sister Cynthia married Manny Villar, enabling her branch of the family to become nationally prominent, with herself, her husband, and son Mark Villar later being elected to the Senate of the Philippines. The other branches of the family also entered local politics and together they have ruled the city.

The run-up to the 2025 Philippine general election has caused a fracture in the family, particularly between the sisters-in-law Mayor Imelda Aguilar and Senator Cynthia Viliar. The term-limited senator has hinted she will run for either mayor or representative, in direct conflict with her niece, Vice Mayor April Aguilar-Nery. As a result, Mayor Aguilar and Vice Mayor Aguilar-Nery left the Nacionalista Party, led by Manny Villar, indicating a deepening in the family's rift. The other branches of the family have indicated that they would side with the Villars against the incumbent branch of the family.

== Candidates ==
Candidates in italics indicate incumbents seeking reelection.

=== Administration coalition ===
Team Aguilar
Position	#	Candidate	Party
Mayor	2.	April Aguilar-Nery	NPC
Vice mayor	1.	Imelda Aguilar	NPC
House representative	2.	Mark Anthony Santos	Independent
1st district councilor	1.	Zardi Abellera	NPC
1st district councilor	3.	Alelee Aguilar	NPC
1st district councilor	5.	Brian Bayog	NPC
1st district councilor	11.	Robert Cristobal	NPC
1st district councilor	23.	Marlon Rosales	NPC
1st district councilor	25.	Mark Joseph Santos	NPC
2nd district councilor	4.	Lester Aranda	NPC
2nd district councilor	8.	Emmanuel Luis Casimiro	NPC
2nd district councilor	19.	Tito Martinez	Independent
2nd district councilor	20.	Henry Medina	NPC
2nd district councilor	26.	Macky Saito	NPC
2nd district councilor	29.	Euan Toralballa	NPC

=== Primary opposition coalition ===
Tropang Villar
Position	#	Candidate	Party
Mayor	3.	Carlo Aguilar	Nacionalista
Vice mayor	5.	Luis Bustamante	Nacionalista
House representative	4.	Cynthia Villar	Nacionalista
1st district councilor	2.	Adelbert Aguilar	Nacionalista
1st district councilor	4.	Julio Balanag	Nacionalista
1st district councilor	6.	Jess Bustamante	Nacionalista
1st district councilor	12.	Rhoderick De Leon	Nacionalista
1st district councilor	20.	Oscar Peña	Nacionalista
1st district councilor	22.	Rex Riguera	Nacionalista
2nd district councilor	1.	Lord Linley Aguilar	Nacionalista
2nd district councilor	15.	Gywyn Gonzales	Independent
2nd district councilor	18.	Albert Hernandez	Independent
2nd district councilor	23.	Ruben Ramos	Nacionalista
2nd district councilor	24.	Bonifacio Riguera	Nacionalista
2nd district councilor	27.	Yolanda Tan	Nacionalista

=== Other coalitions ===
Team Pagbabago–Ang Bagong Las Piñas (Katipunan ng Nagkakaisang Pilipino)
Position	#	Name	Party
House representative	1.	Luisito Redoble	KANP
Mayor	7.	Emerito Rivera	Independent
Vice mayor	6.	Luis Casimiro	Independent
1st district councilor	8.	Michael Castillo	Independent
1st district councilor	9.	Marino Chavez	Independent
1st district councilor	19.	Davey John Medidas	PDP
2nd district councilor	14.	Alberto Goco	Independent
2nd district councilor	31.	Virgilio Valle Jr.	Independent

Team Ducat
Position	#	Name	Party
Mayor	5.	Armando Ducat Jr.	Independent
Vice mayor	2.	Edilberto Angeles	Independent
1st district councilor	10.	Jeric Antoni Calve	Independent
1st district councilor	24.	Maria Teresa Santamaria	Independent
2nd district councilor	16.	Simnar Gran	Independent
2nd district councilor	17.	Elmer Gregorio	Independent
2nd district councilor	28.	Pedro Tato	Independent

=== Other parties ===
Makabayan
Position	#	Name	Party
1st district councilor	7.	Jinsei Ray Castillo	Makabayan

Partido Maharlika
Position	#	Name	Party
Mayor	1.	Antonio Abellar Jr.	PM

=== Independents ===
Independent
Position	#	Name	Party
Mayor	4.	Rolando Barredo Jr.	Independent
Mayor	6.	Conrado Antonio Miranda	Independent
Vice mayor	3.	Felipe Arteta	Independent
Vice mayor	4.	Eduveges Batalan	Independent
Vice mayor	7.	Quirino Ruben Chavez	Independent
Vice mayor	8.	Angelico Francisco David	Independent
House representative	3.	John Barry Tayam	Independent
1st district councilor	13.	Larry Esmeña	Independent
1st district councilor	14.	Larry Eusebio	Independent
1st district councilor	15.	Amelita Gallano	Independent
1st district councilor	16.	Angelito Jamco Jr.	Independent
1st district councilor	17.	Rodolfo Llupar	Independent
1st district councilor	18.	Lauro Matundan III	Independent
1st district councilor	21.	Larry Perez	Independent
1st district councilor	26.	Rick Jason Someros	Independent
1st district councilor	27.	Angelita Suñer	Independent
1st district councilor	28.	Maria Zharina Tolentino	Independent
2nd district councilor
2nd district councilor	2.	Michaela Irish Alvarado	Independent
2nd district councilor	3.	Avelino Andal	Independent
2nd district councilor	5.	Jefferson Boyo	Independent
2nd district councilor	6.	Adoracion Bustillo	Independent
2nd district councilor	7.	Danilo Calitizen	Independent
2nd district councilor	9.	Marlon Dayao	Independent
2nd district councilor	10.	Irene Deciembre	Independent
2nd district councilor	11.	Berlin Dela Cruz	Independent
2nd district councilor	12.	Noli Fiesta	Independent
2nd district councilor	13.	Angelo Anthony Garcia	Independent
2nd district councilor	21.	Edgardo Parungao	Independent
2nd district councilor	22.	Carlson Pascual	Independent
2nd district councilor	25.	Adelia Rosales	Independent
2nd district councilor	30.	Edgardo Tugano Jr.	Independent
2nd district councilor	32.	Araceli Ventura	Independent

== Mayoral election ==
The incumbent is Imelda Aguilar, who is term-limited after winning her third consecutive term in 2022. She will instead run for Vice Mayor. The race will be contested by cousins, Incumbent Vice Mayor April Aguilar-Nery and former City Councilor Carlo Aguilar.

=== Candidates ===
==== Declared ====
- April Aguilar-Nery, incumbent vice mayor (2019–present)
- Carlo Aguilar, former city councilor (2010–2019)

2025 Las Piñas mayoral election
Candidate	Party	Votes	%
April Aguilar-Nery	Nationalist People's Coalition	117,800	48.54
Carlo Aguilar	Nacionalista Party	80,880	33.33
Emerito Rivera	Independent	25,205	10.39
Armando Ducat Jr.	Independent	10,548	4.35
Antonio Abellar Jr.	Partido Maharlika	3,725	1.54
Conrado Antonio Miranda	Independent	2,827	1.16
Rolando Barredo Jr.	Independent	1,678	0.69
Total		242,663	100.00
Nationalist People's Coalition hold			

== Vice mayoral election ==
Incumbent vice mayor April Aguilar-Nery is on her second term, having defended the seat in the 2022 elections. She was eligible to run for her third consecutive term, but decided to run for Mayor instead. running for the position are Incumbent Mayor Imelda Aguilar and former Vice Mayor and Incumbent City Councilor Luis Bustamante.

=== Candidates ===
==== Declared ====
- Imelda Aguilar, incumbent mayor of Las Piñas (2016–present)
- Luis Bustamante, incumbent City councilor (2019–present)

2025 Las Piñas Vice mayoral election
Candidate	Party	Votes	%
Imelda Aguilar	Nationalist People's Coalition	123,622	51.98
Luis Bustamante	Nacionalista Party	68,058	28.62
Luis Casimiro	Independent	24,907	10.47
Edilberto Angeles	Independent	11,305	4.75
Quirino Ruben Chavez	Independent	4,327	1.82
Angelico Francisco David	Independent	2,252	0.95
Felipe Arteta	Independent	2,027	0.85
Eduveges Batalan	Independent	1,321	0.56
Total		237,819	100.00
Nationalist People's Coalition hold			

== City Council election ==
The Las Piñas Council has 14 members, 12 of which are elected via plurality block voting for three-year terms. It is divided into two city council districts, with six councilors each.

=== First District ===
The first city council district is composed of the northern barangays of the city, namely BF International Village, Daniel Fajardo, Elias Aldana, Ilaya, Manuyo Uno, Manuyo Dos, Pamplona Uno, Pamplona Tres, Pulang Lupa Uno, Pulang Lupa Dos, Talon Uno and Zapote.

The administration coalition won a slim majority of the district's seats in 2022, winning four of the six contested seats.

Term-limited councilors

2025 Las Piñas City Council election in the 1st district
Candidate	Party or alliance		Votes	%
Alelee Aguilar	Team Aguilar	Nationalist People's Coalition	71,492	48.65
Adelbert Aguilar	Tropang Villar	Nacionalista Party	54,800	37.29
Jess Bustamante (incumbent)	Tropang Villar	Nacionalista Party	45,730	31.12
Rhoderick De Leon	Tropang Villar	Nacionalista Party	42,337	28.81
Mark Joseph Santos	Team Aguilar	Nationalist People's Coalition	41,287	28.10
Roberto Cristobal	Team Aguilar	Nationalist People's Coalition	40,946	27.87
Bernard Bayog	Team Aguilar	Nationalist People's Coalition	40,004	27.22
Rex Hans Riguera (incumbent)	Tropang Villar	Nacionalista Party	39,366	26.79
Oscar Peña (incumbent)	Tropang Villar	Nacionalista Party	37,749	25.69
Julio Balanag	Tropang Villar	Nacionalista Party	31,721	21.59
Zardi Abellera	Team Aguilar	Nationalist People's Coalition	27,700	18.85
Marlon Rosales	Team Aguilar	Nationalist People's Coalition	25,032	17.04
Davey John Medidas	Partido Demokratiko Pilipino		14,817	10.08
Maria Zharina Tolentino	Independent		12,425	8.46
Marino Chavez	Independent		12,425	8.46
Rick Jason Someros	Independent		12,255	8.34
Jinsei Ray Castillo	Makabayan		12,093	8.23
Michael Castillo	Independent		11,089	7.55
Larry Eusebio	Independent		9,814	6.68
Maria Teresa Santamaria	Independent		6,941	4.72
Larry Perez	Independent		5,726	3.90
Amelita Gallano	Independent		5,507	3.75
Larry Esmeña	Independent		5,272	3.59
Jeric Antoni Calve	Independent		4,793	3.26
Lauro Matundan III	Independent		3,904	2.66
Angelita Suñer	Independent		3,232	2.20
Angelito Jamco Jr.	Independent		3,188	2.17
Rodolfo Llupar	Independent		3,085	2.10
Total			624,730	100.00

=== Second District ===
The second city council district is composed of the southern barangays of the city, namely. Almanza Uno, Almanza Dos, Pamplona Dos, Pilar, Talon Dos, Talon Tres, Talon Kuatro and Talon Singko.

The administration coalition won a slim majority of the district's seats in 2022, winning four of the six contested seats.

Term-limited councilors

2025 Las Piñas City Council election in the 2nd district
Candidate	Party or alliance		Votes	%
Lord Linley Aguilar (incumbent)	Tropang Villar	Nacionalista Party	58,631	54.03
Henry Medina (incumbent)	Team Aguilar	Nationalist People's Coalition	54,456	50.18
Ruben Ramos (incumbent)	Tropang Villar	Nacionalista Party	50,090	46.16
Emmanuel Luis Casimiro (incumbent)	Team Aguilar	Nationalist People's Coalition	37,868	34.90
Albert Francis Hernandez	Tropang Villar	Independent	31,437	28.97
Makoto Julius Saito	Team Aguilar	Nationalist People's Coalition	29,897	27.55
Euan Rex Toralballa	Team Aguilar	Nationalist People's Coalition	29,758	27.42
Gywyn Gonzales	Tropang Villar	Independent	29,381	27.08
Restituto Martinez	Team Aguilar	Independent	28,304	26.08
Lester Aranda	Team Aguilar	Nationalist People's Coalition	26,191	24.14
Yolanda Tan	Tropang Villar	Nacionalista Party	24,376	22.46
Bonifacio Riguera	Tropang Villar	Nacionalista Party	19,674	18.13
Angelo Anthony Garcia	Independent		19,574	18.04
Edgardo Tugano Jr.	Independent		17,776	16.38
Berlin Dela Cruz	Independent		18,266	16.83
Carlson Pascual	Independent		10,655	9.82
Edgardo Parungao	Independent		8,313	7.66
Adelia Rosales	Independent		8,233	7.59
Avelino Andal	Independent		7,875	7.26
Alberto Goco	Independent		7,587	6.99
Jefferson Boyo	Independent		7,461	6.88
Michaela Irish Alvarado	Independent		6,811	6.28
Elmer Gregorio	Independent		6,802	6.27
Virgilio Valle Jr.	Independent		6,117	5.64
Marlon Dayao	Independent		5,806	5.35
Araceli Ventura	Independent		5,662	5.22
Alex Tato	Independent		5,110	4.71
Irene Deciembre	Independent		4,961	4.57
Adoracion Bustillo	Independent		4,964	4.57
Noli Fiesta	Independent		3,883	3.58
Simnar Gran	Independent		2,803	2.58
Danilo Calitizen	Partido Maharlika		2,390	2.20
Total			581,112	100.00

== House of Representatives election ==
2025 Las Piñas's lone district election
- May 12, 2025
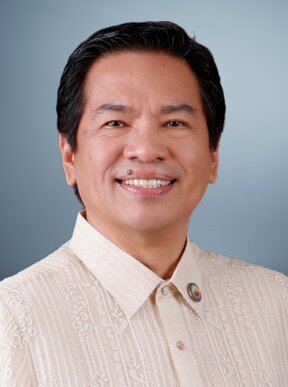

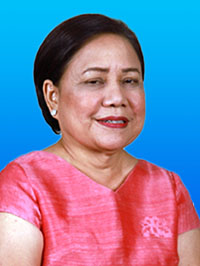

	Majority party	Minority party	Third party
Candidate	Mark Anthony Santos	Cynthia Villar	Luisito Redoble
Party	Independent	Nacionalista	KANP
Alliance	Team Aguilar	Alliances: Alyansa para sa Bagong Pilipinas (national); Tropang Villar (local)	Alliances: KiBam (national); Bagong Las Piñas (local)
Popular vote	109,220	79,315	35,730
Percentage	46.75%	33.95%	15.29%
- Results by barangay and margin
Philippine Representative before election
Camille Villar
Nacionalista
Elected Philippine Representative
Mark Anthony Santos
Independent

The city elects one representative to the House of Representatives. The incumbent is Camille Villar, who is on her second consecutive term. She was eligible to run for a third and final consecutive term, but chose to run for senator under the administration's Alyansa para sa Bagong Pilipinas coalition.

=== Candidates ===
- Luisito Redoble
- Mark Anthony Santos, incumbent City councilor (2022–present)
- John Barry Tayam, senior high school instructor
- Cynthia Villar, incumbent Senator of the Philippines (2013–present)

2025 Philippine House of Representatives election in Las Piñas's Lone District
Candidate	Party	Votes	%
Mark Anthony Santos	Independent	109,220	46.75
Cynthia Villar	Nacionalista	79,315	33.95
Luisito Redoble	KANP	35,730	15.29
John Barry Tayam	Independent	9,359	4.01
Total		233,624	100.00
Independent gain from Nacionalista			
