= 2019 Las Piñas local elections =

Philippine election

2019 Las Piñas mayoral election
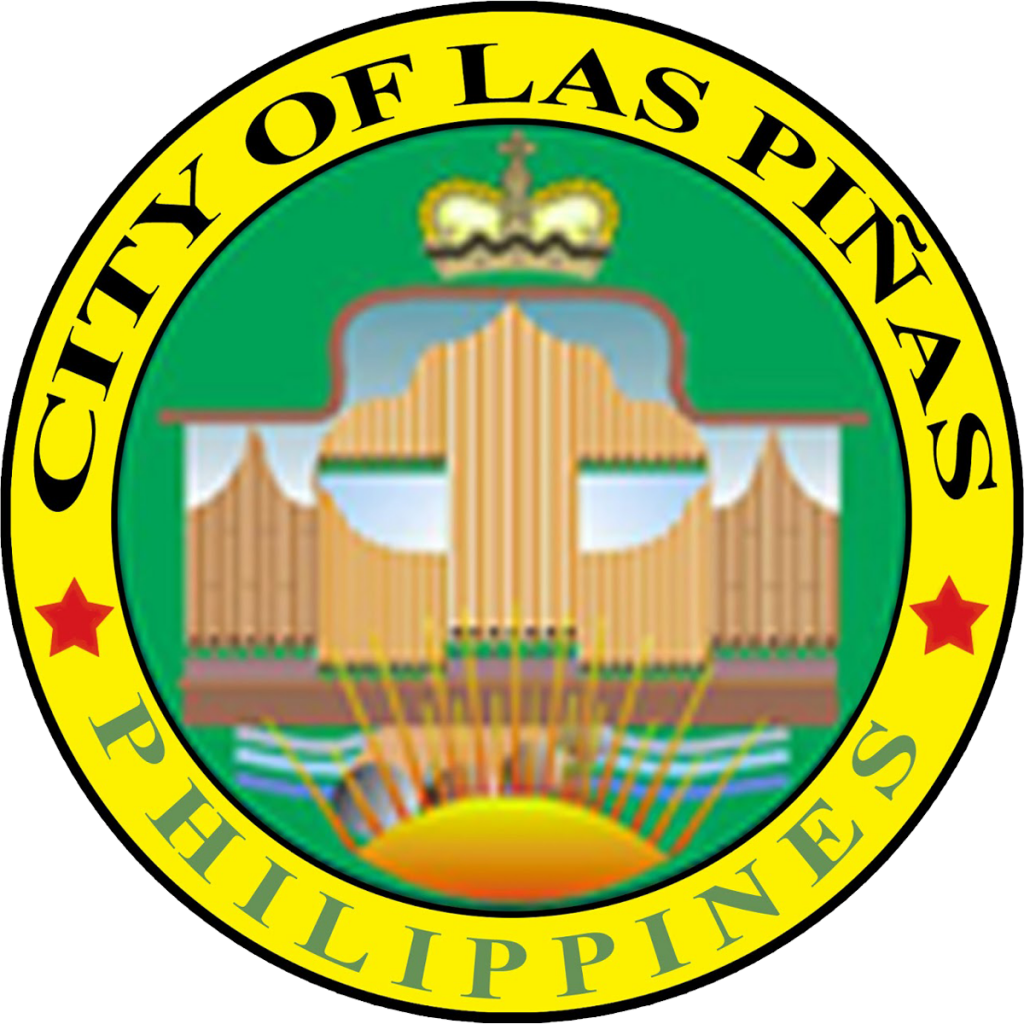
- May 13, 2019
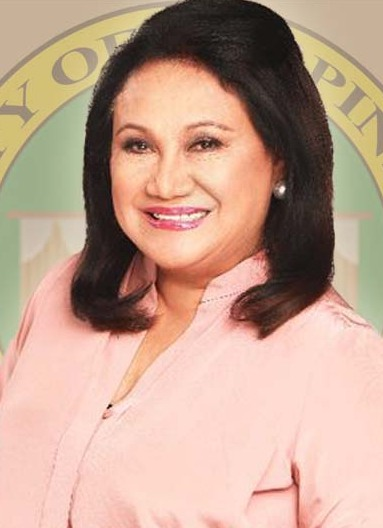
Nominee	Imelda Aguilar	Louie Casimiro
Party	NPC	Independent
Running mate	April Aguilar-Nery	Antonio Abellar Jr.
Popular vote	170,972	12,394
Percentage	87.81	6.37
Mayor before election
Imelda Aguilar
Nacionalista
Elected mayor
Imelda Aguilar
NPC

Local elections were held in Las Piñas on Monday, May 13, 2019, as a part of the 2019 Philippine general election. Voters elected candidates for the local elective posts in the city: the mayor, vice mayor, the congressman, and the councilors, six of them in the two districts of the city.

There are a total of 208,736 people who voted out of the 328,384 registered voters.

== Background ==
Mayor Imelda Aguilar sought for her second consecutive, third non-consecutive term. She was challenged by Luis "Louie" Casimiro, Conrado Miranda, and former Councilor Benjamin Gonzales.

Vice Mayor Luis "Louie" Bustamante was term limited and ran as councilor instead. His party nominated April Aguilar-Nery, daughter of Mayor Aguilar, to run in his place. Aguilar-Nery was challenged by Antonio Abellar Jr.

After Representative Mark Villar was appointed as Secretary of the Department of Public Works and Highways in 2016, he was replaced by his wife, Emmeline Aglipay-Villar as interim representative. The congressional seat were contested by Camille Villar and Jerry Delos Reyes.

== Results ==
=== For Mayor ===
Mayor Imelda Aguilar was re-elected with 170,972 votes garnered.

Las Piñas Mayoral Elections
Party	Candidate	Votes	%
NPC	Imelda Aguilar	170,972	87.81
Independent	Luis "Louie" Casimiro	12,394	6.37
Independent	Conrado Miranda	6,356	3.26
Independent	Benjamin Gonzales	4,985	2.56
Total votes		194,707	100.00
NPC hold			

=== For Vice Mayor ===
April Aguilar-Nery, daughter of the incumbent Mayor Imelda Aguilar, won with 161,789 votes.

Las Piñas Vice Mayoral Elections
Party	Candidate	Votes	%
NPC	April Aguilar-Nery	161,789	86.32
Independent	Antonio Abellar Jr.	25,638	13.68
Total votes		187,427	100.00
NPC hold			

=== For Representative ===
Camille Villar won over her rival, Jerry Delos Reyes, garnering 173,917 votes.

Congressional Elections in Las Piñas's Lone District
Party	Candidate	Votes	%
Nacionalista	Camille Villar	173,917	89.78
Independent	Jerry Delos Reyes	19,791	10.22
Total votes		193,708	100.00

=== For Councilor ===
==== First District ====
City Council Elections in Las Piñas's First District
Party	Candidate	Votes	%
NPC	Filemon "Peewee" Aguilar III	79,939	16.21
NPC	Oscar Peña	63,617	12.90
NPC	Rex Hans Riguera	61,107	12.39
NPC	Alfredo "Steve" Miranda	58,938	11.95
NPC	Florante Dela Cruz	55,564	11.27
NPC	Julio "Rey" Banalag	41,017	8.32
Independent	Jaime Santos	32,080	6.51
Independent	Emmanuel "Manuel" Cristobal	24,182	4.90
Independent	Waldemar "Wandy" Marasigan	17,272	3.50
Independent	Angelico Francisco "Cyril" David	14,674	2.98
Independent	Noel Fortuna	12,835	2.60
Independent	Nestor Lindayao	11,611	2.35
Independent	Rogelio Cuico	10,866	2.20
Independent	Marvin Matta	9,372	1.90
Total votes		493,074	100.00

==== Second District ====
City Council Elections in Las Piñas's Second District
Party	Candidate	Votes	%
Nacionalista	Lord Linley Aguilar	72,159	15.33
NPC	Luis "Louie" Bustamante	68,746	14.61
NPC	Ruben Ramos	59,861	12.72
NPC	Danilo "Danny" Hernandez	51,215	10.88
NPC	Ignacio "Gerry" Sangga	45,505	9.67
NPC	Bonifacio Riguera	41,436	8.80
Independent	Luigi Casimiro	29,098	6.18
Independent	Gywyn Gonzales	22,810	4.85
Independent	Jaime "Jimmy" Martin	20,417	4.34
Independent	Avelino Andal	9,727	2.07
Independent	Salvador Solidum	9,461	2.01
Independent	Antonio "Tony" Luna	9,105	1.93
Independent	Joy Mae Astrologo	7,648	1.62
Independent	Alberto Peñafiel	7,251	1.54
Independent	Zenaida Cabornay	6,407	1.36
Independent	Oliver "Ver" Sabaulan	5,442	1.16
Independent	Ronnie Calawod	4,396	0.93
Total votes		470,684	100.00
