= 2016 Las Piñas local elections =

Philippine election

2016 Las Piñas mayoral election
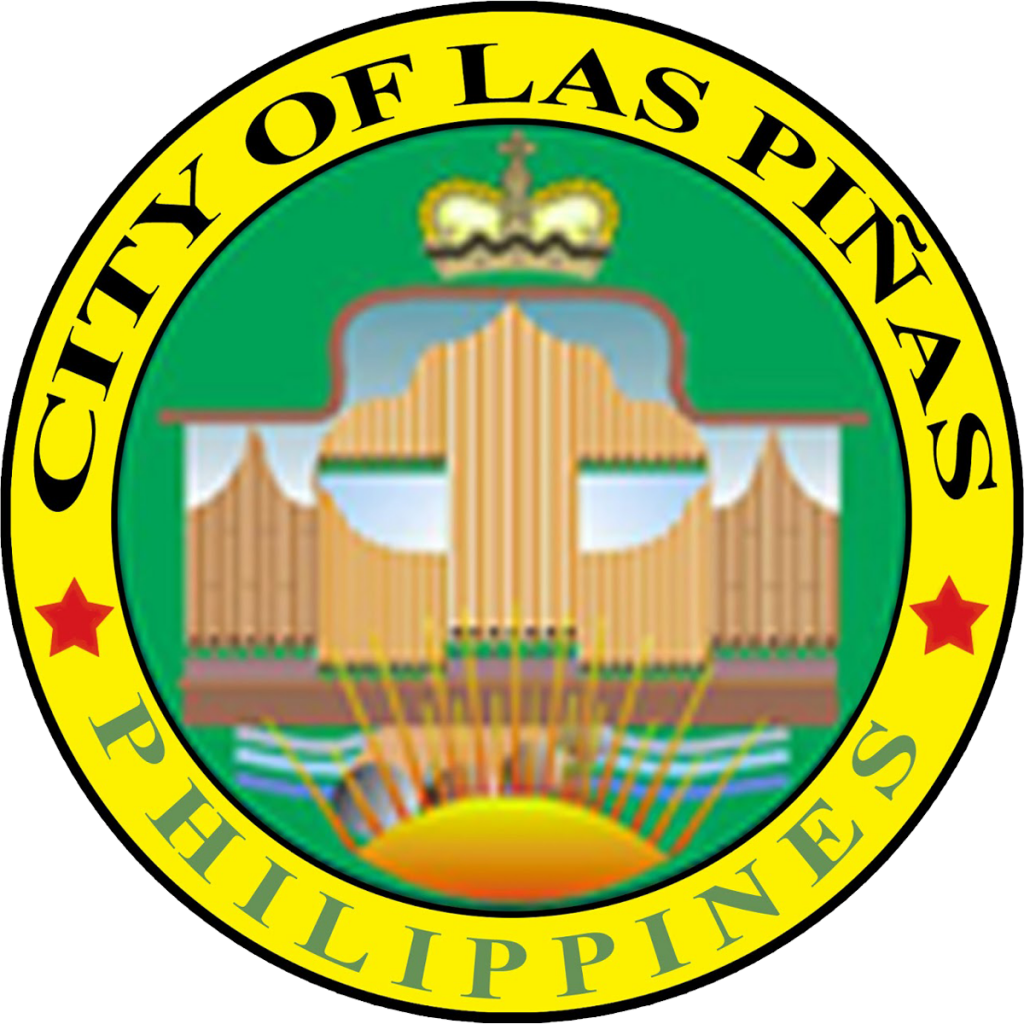
- May 9, 2016
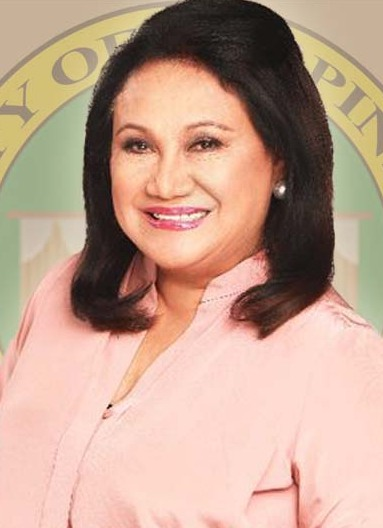
Nominee	Imelda Aguilar	Benjamin Gonzales
Party	Nacionalista	UNA
Running mate	Louie Bustamante	Luis "Louie" Casimiro
Popular vote	184,437	6,481
Percentage	91.32	3.21
Mayor before election
Vergel Aguilar
Nacionalista
Elected mayor
Imelda Aguilar
Nacionalista

Local elections were held in Las Piñas on May 9, 2016, within the Philippine general election. The voters elected for the elective local posts in the city: the mayor, vice mayor, the one Congressman, and the councilors, six in each of the city's two legislative districts.

== Background ==
Mayor Vergel "Nene" Aguilar was term-limited. His wife, former Mayor Imelda Aguilar ran for his place instead. Aguilar was challenged by former Councilor Benjamin Gonzales, Antonio Abellar Jr., Gabina Punsalan, Vergilio Lontoc, and Rolly Gundan.

Vice Mayor Luis "Louie" Bustamante sought re-election. He ran for third and final term, and challenged by Luis "Louie" Casimiro.

Rep. Mark Villar sought re-election for third consecutive term. He faced incumbent First District Councilor Zardi Abellera and Filipino Alvarado.

== Results ==
=== For Mayor ===
Former Mayor Imelda Aguilar succeeded his husband, won with 184,437 votes over his closest rivals former Councilor Benjamin Gonzales and Antonio Abellar Jr. with 6,481 and 5,952 votes respectively.

Las Piñas Mayoral Elections
Party	Candidate	Votes	%
Nacionalista	Imelda Aguilar	184,437	91.32
UNA	Benjamin Gonzales	6,481	3.21
Independent	Antonio Abellar, Jr.	5,952	2.95
PDP–Laban	Gabina Punsalan	2,780	1.38
NPC	Vergilio Lontoc	1,440	0.71
Independent	Rolly Gundan	868	0.43
Total votes		201,958	100.00

=== For Vice Mayor ===
Vice Mayor Luis "Louie" Bustamante won with 156,437 votes over Luis "Louie" Casimiro with 37,211 votes.

Las Piñas Vice Mayoralty Elections
Party	Candidate	Votes	%
Nacionalista	Luis "Louie" Bustamante	156,457	80.79
UNA	Luis "Louie" Casimiro	37,211	19.21
Total votes		193,668	100.00

=== For Representative ===
Rep. Mark Villar won with 174,533 votes over his closest rival, incumbent First District Councilor Zardi Abellera with 23,780 votes.

Congressional Election in Las Piñas's Lone District
Party	Candidate	Votes	%
Nacionalista	Mark Villar	174,533	86.05
PDP–Laban	Zardi Abellara	23,780	11.72
UNA	Filipino Alvarado	4,509	2.23
Total votes		202,822	100.00

=== For Councilor ===
==== First District ====
City Council Elections in Las Piñas's First District
Party	Candidate	Votes	%
Nacionalista	Filemon "Peewee" Aguilar II	86,129	
Nacionalista	Mark Anthony Santos	70,346	
Nacionalista	Buenaventura "Ben" Quilatan	67,114	
Nacionalista	Florante Dela Cruz	63,544	
Nacionalista	Alfredo Miranda	61,248	
Nacionalista	Renan Riguera	59,518	
UNA	Emmanuel Cristobal	31,295	
UNA	Waldy Marasigan	22,753	
UNA	Roderic Vilbar	18,504	
PDP–Laban	Leonilo Cordova	12,392	
PDP–Laban	Alejandro Madaje	11,809	
Total votes			

==== Second District ====
City Council Elections in Las Piñas's Second District
Party	Candidate	Votes	%
Nacionalista	Carlo Aguilar	83,699	
Nacionalista	Henry Medina	73,074	
Nacionalista	Rubymar Ramos	65,472	
Nacionalista	Danilo Hernandez	62,661	
Nacionalista	Bonifacio Riguera	56,363	
Nacionalista	Ignacio "Gerry" Sangga	51,000	
UNA	Luigi Casimiro	38,062	
UNA	Jesus Casim, Jr.	18,885	
Total votes			

== Note ==
Representative Mark Villar was considered to run for the Senatorial post, but he decided to sought a reelection this election after a series of consultations with his family and the constituents.
