= 2007 Las Piñas local elections =

Philippine election

2007 Las Piñas mayoral election
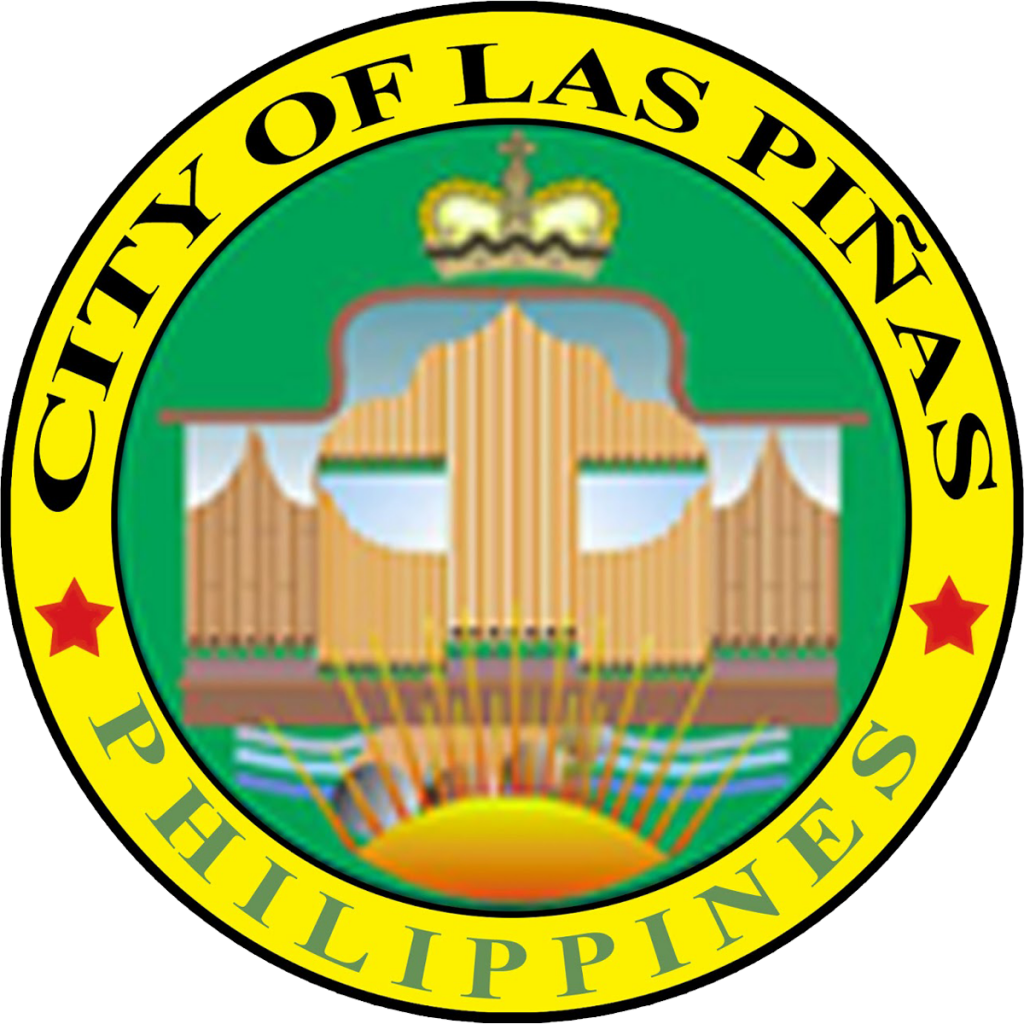
- May 14, 2007
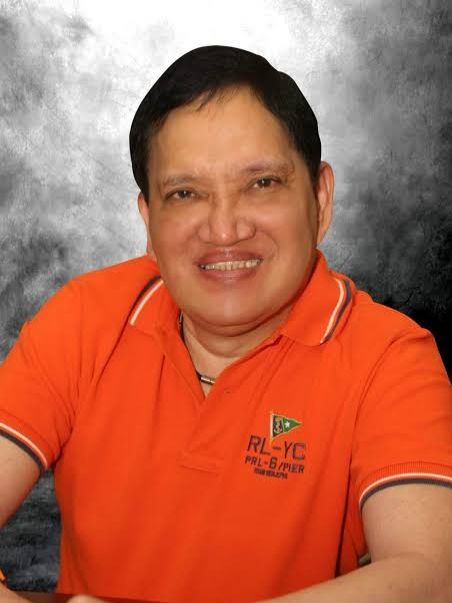
Nominee	Vergel Aguilar
Party	Independent
Running mate	Henry Medina (Lakas)
Popular vote	158,031
Percentage	97.97
Mayor before election
Imelda Aguilar
Independent
Elected mayor
Vergel Aguilar
Independent

Local elections were held in Las Piñas on May 14, 2007, within the Philippine general election. The voters elected for the elective local posts in the city: the mayor, vice mayor, one representative, and the councilors, six in each of the city's two legislative districts.

== Background ==
Mayor Imelda Aguilar is not seeking for re-election. Her husband, former Mayor Vergel Aguilar will ran in her stead.

Vice Mayor Luis Bustamante was term-limited, and will ran as 2nd district councilor. His party has chosen Councilor Henry Medina.

Representative Cynthia Villar will ran for re-election for her third and final term.

== Results ==
=== For Representative ===
Representative Cynthia Villar was re-elected.

2007 Las Piñas Lone District Representative election
Candidate	Party	Votes	%
Cynthia Villar (incumbent)	Nacionalista Party	151,780	97.39
Florentino Alumbares	Kabalikat ng Malayang Pilipino	2,445	1.57
Nestor Buenaflor	Independent	1,618	1.04
Total		155,843	100.00
Nacionalista Party hold			

=== For Mayor ===
Mayor Vergel Aguilar was elected to fourth non-consecutive term.

2007 Las Piñas mayoral election
Candidate	Party	Votes	%
Vergel Aguilar (incumbent)	Independent	158,031	97.97
Antonio Abellar Jr.	Kabalikat ng Malayang Pilipino	1,682	1.04
Jefferson Tatlonghari	Kabalikat ng Malayang Pilipino	1,088	0.67
Benjamin Roque	Independent	502	0.31
Total		161,303	100.00
Independent hold			

=== For Vice Mayor ===
Councilor Henry Medina won the elections.

2007 Las Piñas vice mayoral election
Candidate	Party	Votes	%
Henry Medina	Lakas–CMD	88,167	57.25
Berlin Dela Cruz	Nationalist People's Coalition	61,358	39.84
Benjamin Gonzales	Pwersa ng Masang Pilipino	3,288	2.14
Ferdinand Martinez	Kabalikat ng Malayang Pilipino	1,181	0.77
Total		153,994	100.00
Lakas–CMD hold			

=== For Councilor ===
==== First District ====
City Council Elections in Las Piñas's First District
Party	Candidate	Votes	%
Lakas	Dennis Aguilar	59,969	
Lakas	Oscar "Oca" Peña	53,326	
Lakas	Rex Hans Riguerra	49,014	
Lakas	Demetrio "Metring" Cristobal	42,638	
Lakas	Eduardo "Eddie" Lezarda	42,052	
Lakas	Alfredo "Steve" Miranda	41,882	

==== Second District ====
City Council Elections in Las Piñas's Second District
Party	Candidate	Votes	%
Lakas	Luis "Louie" Bustamante	55,978	
Lakas	Ruben "Ben" Ramos	51,143	
Lakas	Renato "Rene" Dumlao	43,552	
Lakas	Leopoldo "Dong" Benedicto	42,855	
Independent	Perpetou Camila	42,696	
Lakas	Danilo Hernandez	38,593	
