= 2022 Las Piñas local elections =

2022 Las Piñas mayoral election
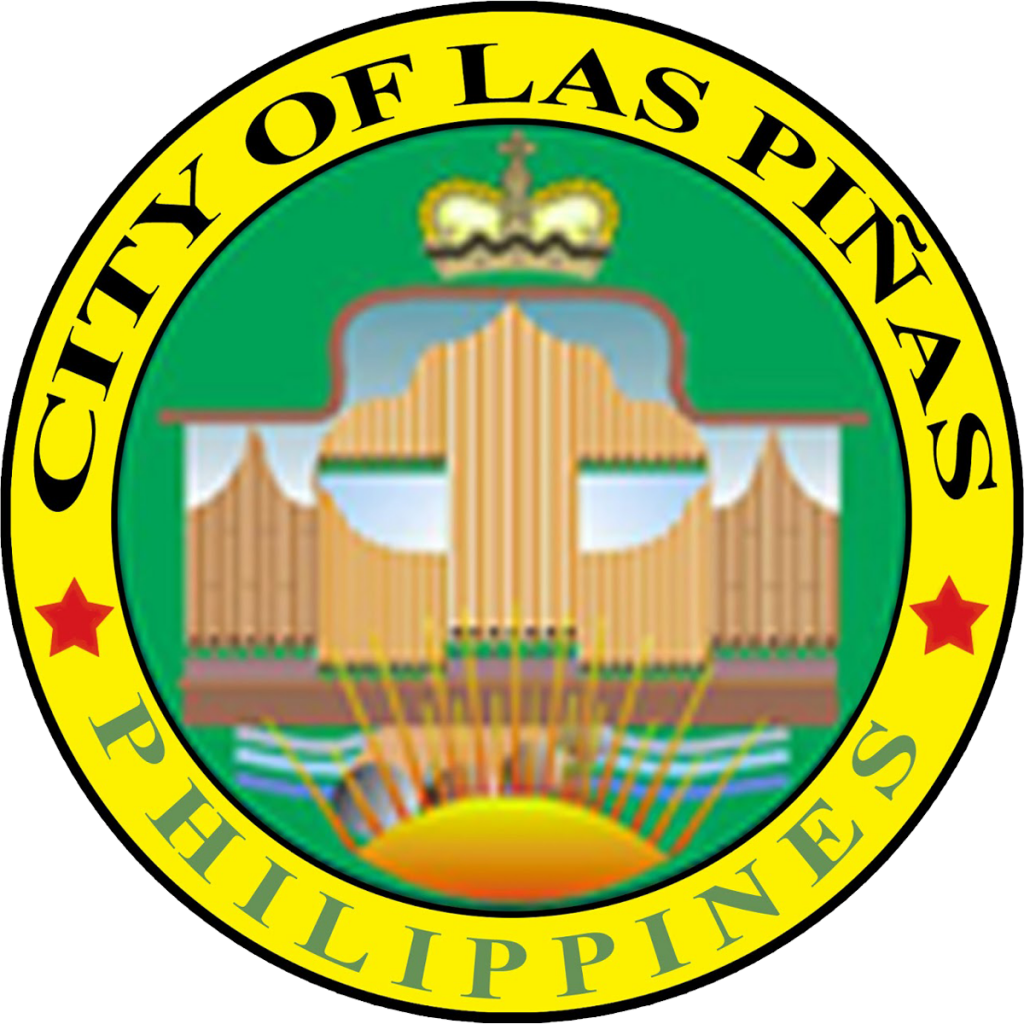
- May 9, 2022
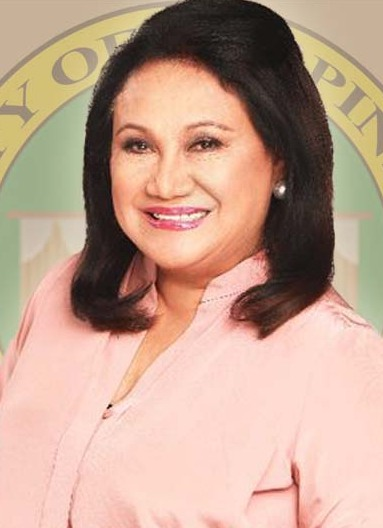

Nominee	Imelda Aguilar	Ferdinand Eusebio	Emerito Rivera
Party	Nacionalista	Independent	Ang Kapatiran
Running mate	April Aguilar-Nery		Jerry Delos Reyes
Popular vote	108,644	38,285	35,531
Percentage	47.90	16.88	15.67
Nominee	Luis "Louie" Casimiro
Party	Independent
Running mate	Edilberto "Ed" Angeles
Popular vote	28,338
Percentage	12.49
- A map showing the results of the Las Piñas mayoral election by barangay
Mayor before election
Imelda Aguilar
NPC
Elected mayor
Imelda Aguilar
Nacionalista

Local elections took place in Las Piñas on May 9, 2022, within the Philippine general election. The voters elected for the elective local posts in the city: the mayor, vice mayor, one representative, and the councilors, six of them in the two districts of the city.

== Background ==
Mayor Imelda Aguilar ran for fourth non-consecutive, third consecutive term. She was challenged by Antonio Abellar Jr., Luis "Louie" Casimiro, Aladin De Jesus, Ferdinand "Doc Ferds" Eusebio, former Councilor Benjamin Gonzales, former city police chief (Ret.) PSSupt. Simnar Gran, Michael Maestrado, and Emerito "Rey" Rivera.

Vice Mayor April Aguilar-Nery ran for re-election for her second term. She was challenged by Edilberto "Ed" Angeles, Jerry Delos Reyes, and Antonio "Tony" Luna.

Rep. Camille Villar ran for re-election for her second term. She faced candidates Felipe Garduque II, and Atty. Luisito "Louie" Redoble.

== Candidates ==
=== Administration coalition ===
Team Villar-Aguilar (Nacionalista Party)
#	Name	Party
For House Of Representatives
3.	Camille Villar	Nacionalista
For Mayor
2.	Imelda "Mel" Aguilar	Nacionalista
For Vice Mayor
4.	April Aguilar-Nery	Nacionalista
For Councilor (1st District)
1.	Peewee Aguilar	Nacionalista
2.	Rey Balanag	Nacionalista
7.	Florante dela Cruz	Nacionalista
12.	Steve Miranda	Nacionalista
13.	Oscar Peña	Nacionalista
14.	Rex Hans Riguera	Nacionalista
For Councilor (2nd District)
2.	Lord Linley Aguilar	Nacionalista
4.	Luis "Louie" Bustamante	Nacionalista
8.	Danny Davhez Hernandez	Nacionalista
12.	Ruben Ramos	Nacionalista
13.	Luis Fernando Riguera	Nacionalista
14.	Gerry Sangga	Nacionalista

=== Other coalitions ===
Team Casimiro
#	Name	Party
For House Of Representatives
1.	Felipe Garduque II	Independent
For Mayor
3.	Luis "Louie" Casimiro	Independent
For Vice Mayor
1.	Edilberto "Ed" Angeles	Independent
For Councilor (1st District)
4.	Michael Castillo	Independent
11.	Davey John Medidas	Independent
18.	Zosimo Velasquez	Independent
For Councilor (2nd District)
5.	Emmanuel Luis Casimiro	Independent
7.	Jenny Guinto	Independent
11.	Edgardo Parungao	Independent

Bagong Las Piñas, Now Na! (Ang Kapatiran)
#	Name	Party
For House Of Representatives
2.	Luisito "Louie" Redoble	Ang Kapatiran
For Mayor
9.	Emerito "Rey" Rivera	Ang Kapatiran
For Vice Mayor
2.	Bishop Jerry Delos Reyes	Ang Kapatiran
For Councilor (1st District)
5.	Jeric Antoni Ver Clave	Independent
6.	Angelico Francisco "Cyril" Flores David	WPP
8.	Nestor Lindayao	Independent
9.	Enrico Loberiza	Independent
10.	Leonilo "Leo" Mallo	Independent
15.	Anabelle Rondilla	Ang Kapatiran
For Councilor (2nd District)
6.	Alberto "Abet" Goco	Ang Kapatiran

Partido Maharlika
#	Name	Party
For Mayor
1.	Antonio Abellar Jr.	PM
For Vice Mayor
3.	Antonio Luna	PM
For Councilor (2nd District)
1.	Miguel Acebedo	PM
3.	Joy Mae Astrologo	PM
15.	Julian Teoxon Jr.	PM

=== Candidates not in tickets ===
Partido para sa Demokratikong Reporma
#	Name	Party
For Mayor
7.	Simnar Gran	Reporma

Aksyon Demokratiko
#	Name	Party
For Councilor (2nd District)
9.	Henry Medina	Aksyon

Nationalist People's Coalition
#	Name	Party
For Councilor (1st District)
16.	Mark Anthony Santos	NPC

=== Independents ===
See the full lists for mayor, vice mayor, representative and councilors.

== Results ==
=== For Mayor ===
Mayor Imelda Aguilar won.

Las Piñas Mayoral Election
Party	Candidate	Votes	%
Nacionalista	Imelda "Mel" Aguilar	108,644	47.90
Independent	Ferdinand "Doc Ferds" Eusebio	38,285	16.88
Ang Kapatiran	Emerito "Rey" Rivera	35,531	15.67
Independent	Luis "Louie" Casimiro	28,338	12.49
Independent	Benjamin Gonzales	5,593	2.47
PM	Antonio Abellar Jr.	4,469	1.97
Independent	Aladin De Jesus	2,727	1.20
Independent	Michael Maestrado	2,705	1.19
Reporma	Simnar Gran	504	0.22
Total votes		226,796	100.00
Nacionalista hold			

=== For Vice Mayor ===
Vice Mayor April Aguilar-Nery won.

Las Piñas Vice Mayoral Election
Party	Candidate	Votes	%
Nacionalista	April Aguilar-Nery	123,457	58.34
Ang Kapatiran	Jerry "Bishop Jerry" Delos Reyes	44,991	21.26
Independent	Edilberto "Ed" Angeles	35,143	16.61
PM	Antonio Luna	8,019	3.79
Total votes		211,610	100.00
Nacionalista hold			

=== For Representative ===
Rep. Camille Villar won.

Congressional Elections in Las Piñas's Lone District
Party	Candidate	Votes	%
Nacionalista	Camille Villar	130,812	60.90
Ang Kapatiran	Luisito "Louie" Redoble	65,751	30.61
Independent	Felipe Garduque II	18,249	8.50
Total votes		214,812	100.00
Nacionalista hold			

=== For Councilors ===
Party or alliance		Votes	%	Seats
Nacionalista Party		592,527	54.48	8
Independents under Team Casimiro		146,056	13.43	1
Bagong Las Piñas, Now Na!	Ang Kapatiran	31,649	2.91	0
Bagong Las Piñas, Now Na!	Labor Party Philippines	11,896	1.09	0
Bagong Las Piñas, Now Na!	Independent	56,252	5.17	0
Bagong Las Piñas, Now Na!	Total	99,797	9.18	0
Aksyon Demokratiko		66,923	6.15	1
Nationalist People's Coalition		62,310	5.73	1
Partido Maharlika		26,085	2.40	0
Independent		93,852	8.63	1
Ex officio seats				2
Total		1,087,550	100.00	14

==== First District ====
City Elections in Las Piñas's First District
Party	Candidate	Votes	%
NPC	Mark Anthony Santos	62,310	25.75
Independent	John Jess Anthony "Jess" Bustamante	59,287	24.50
Nacionalista	Filemon "Peewee" Aguilar III	59,001	24.38
Nacionalista	Rex Hans Riguera	50,816	21.00
Nacionalista	Oscar Peña	50,056	20.68
Nacionalista	Florante Dela Cruz	48,166	19.90
Nacionalista	Alfredo "Steve" Miranda	44,198	18.26
Nacionalista	Julio "Rey" Balanag	33,676	13.91
Independent	Davey John Medidas	22,268	9.20
Independent	Ric Jason Someros	19,800	8.18
Independent	Michael Castillo	16,535	6.83
Ang Kapatiran	Anabelle Rondilla	15,759	6.52
Independent	Zosimo Velasquez	15,688	6.48
Independent	Enrico Loberiza	15,602	6.45
Independent	Nestor Lindayao	14,786	6.11
Independent	Leonilo "Leo" Mallo	13,019	5.38
Independent	Jeric Antoni Ver Clave	12,845	5.31
WPP	Angelico Francisco "Cyril" Flores David	11,896	4.92
Total votes		565,708	100.00

Party or alliance		Votes	%	Seats
Nacionalista Party		285,913	50.54	4
Bagong Las Piñas, Now Na!	Ang Kapatiran	15,759	2.79	0
Bagong Las Piñas, Now Na!	Labor Party Philippines	11,896	2.10	0
Bagong Las Piñas, Now Na!	Independent	56,252	9.94	0
Bagong Las Piñas, Now Na!	Total	83,907	14.83	0
Nationalist People's Coalition		62,310	11.01	1
Independents under Team Casimiro		54,491	9.63	0
Independent		79,087	13.98	1
Total		565,708	100.00	6

==== Second District ====
City Council Elections in Las Piñas's Second District
Party	Candidate	Votes	%
Aksyon	Henry Medina	66,923	27.65
Nacionalista	Luis "Louie" Bustamante	65,236	26.95
Nacionalista	Ruben Ramos	59,593	24.62
Nacionalista	Lord Linley Aguilar	56,867	23.50
Nacionalista	Danilo "Danny" Hernandez	48,844	20.18
Independent	Emmanuel Luis Casimiro	41,048	16.96
Nacionalista	Ignacio "Gerry" Sangga	38,432	15.88
Nacionalista	Luis Fernando Riguera	37,642	15.55
Independent	Edgardo Parungao	27,068	11.18
Independent	Jenny Guinto	23,479	9.70
Ang Kapatiran	Alberto "Abet" Goco	15,890	6.57
Independent	Franz Paolo Muhlfeld	14,765	6.10
PM	Miguel Acebedo	10,817	4.47
PM	Joy Mae Astrologo	7,859	3.25
PM	Julian Teoxon Jr.	7,409	3.06
Total votes		521,842	100.00

Party	Votes	%	Seats
Nacionalista Party	306,614	58.76	4
Independents under Team Casimiro	91,565	17.55	1
Aksyon Demokratiko	66,923	12.82	1
Partido Maharlika	26,085	5.00	0
Ang Kapatiran	15,890	3.04	0
Independent	14,765	2.83	0
Total	521,842	100.00	6
