= Imelda Aguilar =

Vice Mayor of Las Piñas

The Honorable Imelda Aguilar
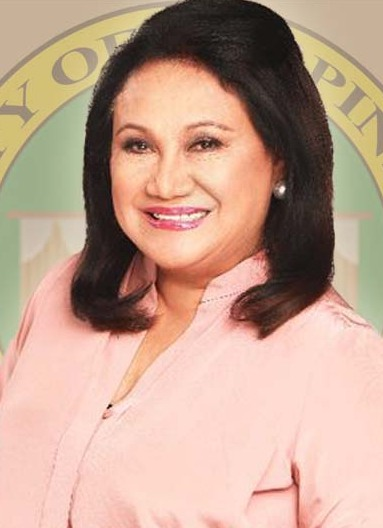

Vice Mayor of Las Piñas
- Incumbent
- Assumed office June 30, 2025
- Mayor: April Aguilar-Nery
- Preceded by: April Aguilar-Nery

Mayor of Las Piñas
- In office June 30, 2016 – June 30, 2025
- Vice Mayor: Luis Bustamante (2016–2019); April Aguilar-Nery (2019–2025)
- Preceded by: Vergel Aguilar
- Succeeded by: April Aguilar-Nery
- In office June 30, 2004 – June 30, 2007
- Vice Mayor: Luis Bustamante
- Preceded by: Vergel Aguilar
- Succeeded by: Vergel Aguilar

Personal details
- Born: Imelda Tobias; February 6, 1947 (age 79) Las Piñas, Rizal, Philippines
- Party: NPC (2018–2021, 2024–present)
- Other political affiliations: Nacionalista (2016–2018, 2021–2024); Independent (until 2016)
- Spouse: Vergel Aguilar (died 2021)
- Children: 4

Imelda "Mel" Tobias Aguilar (born February 6, 1947) is a Filipina politician who served as mayor of Las Piñas from 2016 to 2025, previously holding this position from 2004 until 2007, and currently vice mayor of Las Piñas since 2025.

== Personal life ==
Aguilar was married to former mayor Vergel Aguilar; they have four children. Their daughter, April Aguilar-Nery, serves as her vice mayor of this city from 2019 to 2025 and currently serves as the mayor of Las Pinas since 2025.

Aguilar belongs to a well-established political family in Las Piñas. Her father-in-law, Dr. Filemon Celestino Aguilar Sr. was a Filipino physician and politician from Las Piñas. He served as Mayor of Las Piñas from 1964 to 1986, making him one of the longest-serving mayors in the municipality's history. Following the 1986 EDSA Revolution, he was elected to the House of Representatives, representing the Las Piñas–Muntinlupa district from 1987 to 1992. Known to constituents as "Lolo Cong," he retired from politics in 1992 due to declining health. He is the patriarch of the Aguilar political family, whose members have continued to hold elective office in Las Piñas.

Her brother-in-law, Filemon Ampaya Aguilar Jr., a veteran City Councilor and long-serving President of the Association of Barangay Captains (ABC).

Her sister-in-law, Cynthia Aguilar Villar, a Filipino businesswoman and politician who served as a Senator of the Philippines from 2013 to 2025. She represented the lone district of Las Piñas in the House of Representatives from 2001 to 2010 before her election to the Senate. She is married to former Senate President and House Speaker Manny Villar, and two of their children, Mark and Camille Villar, have also been elected to the Senate.

On August 20, 2021, her husband, Vergel Aguilar, died at the age of 74.
