= Caloocan =

Highly urbanized city in Metro Manila, Philippines

- Highly urbanized city
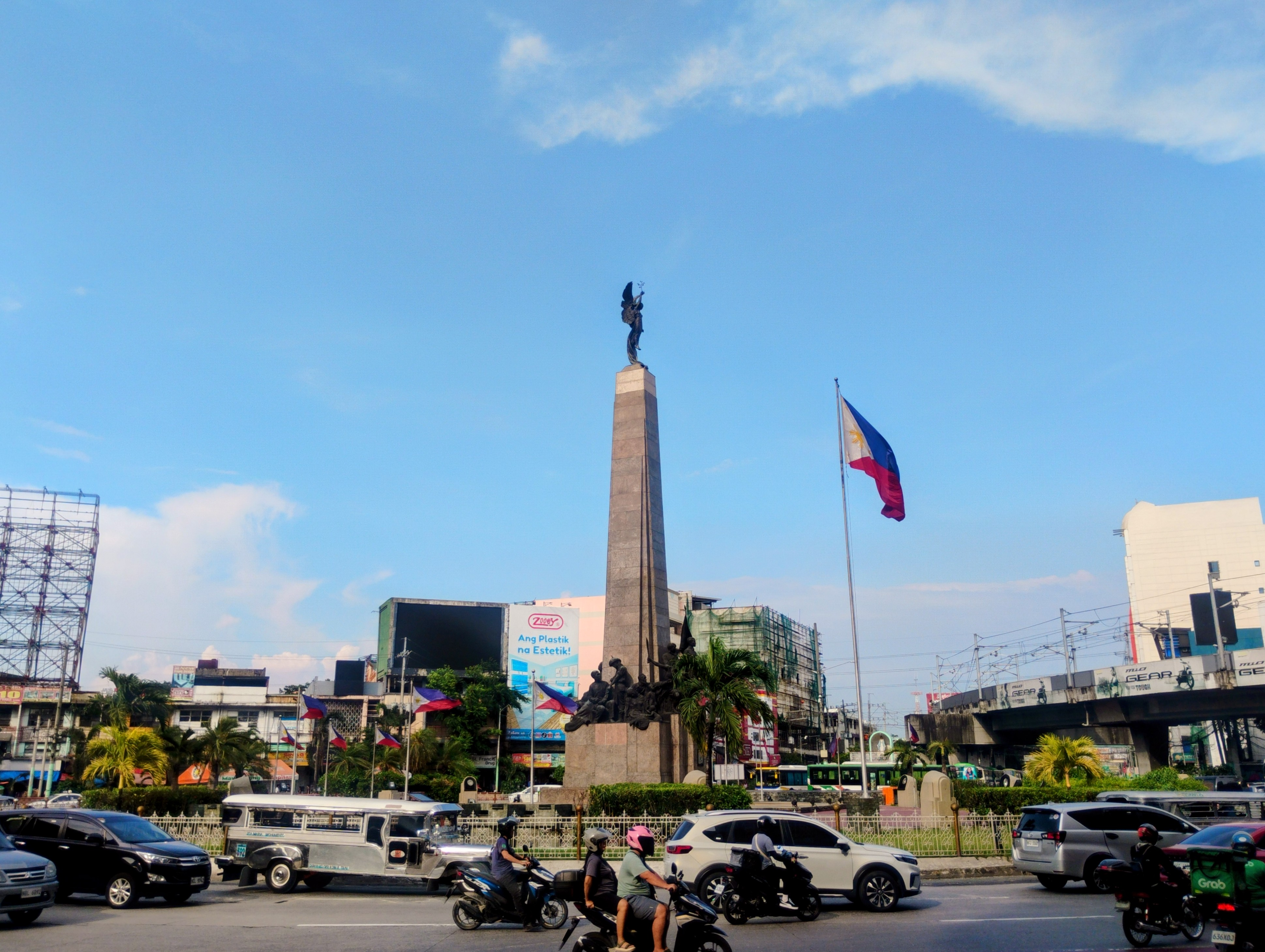
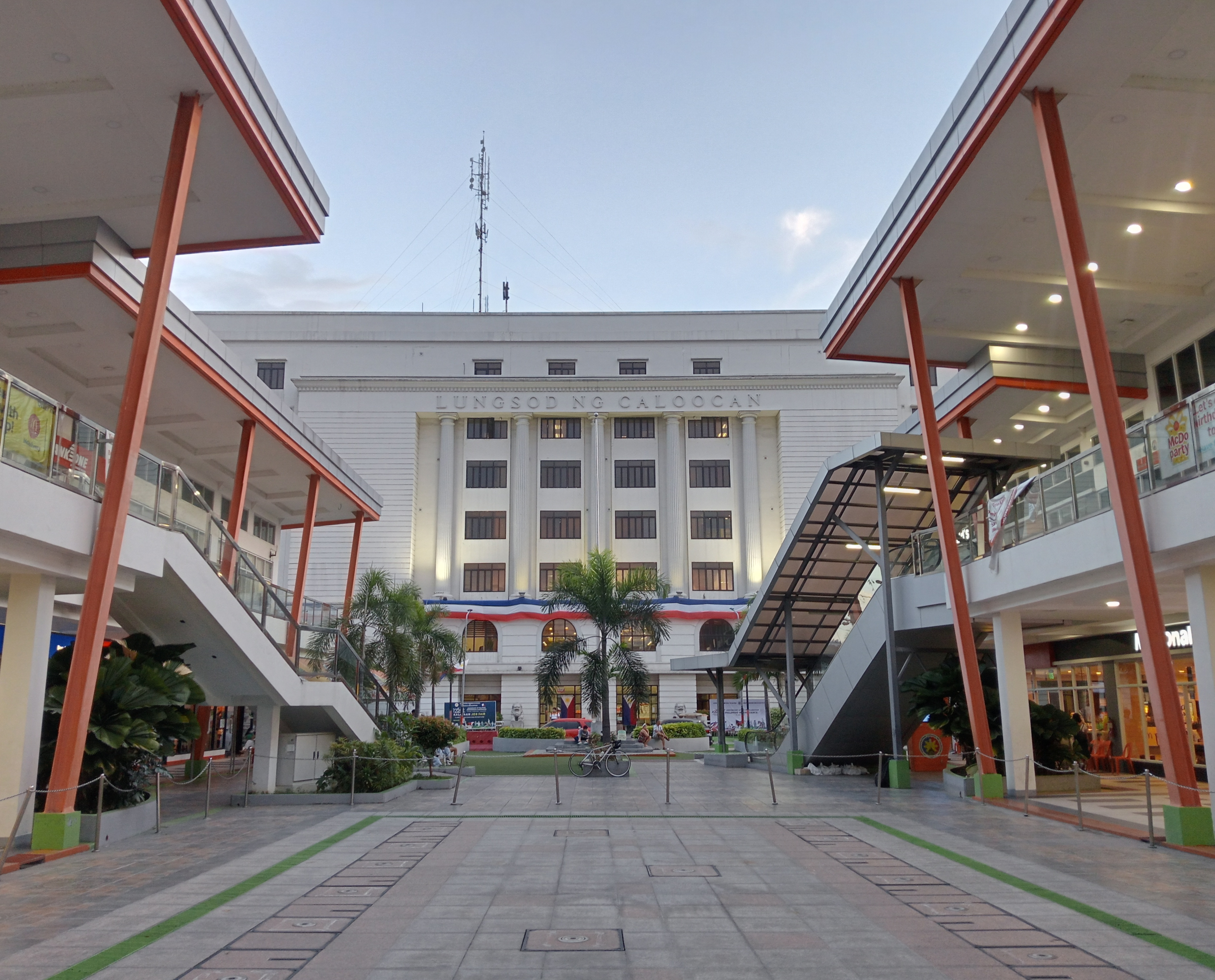
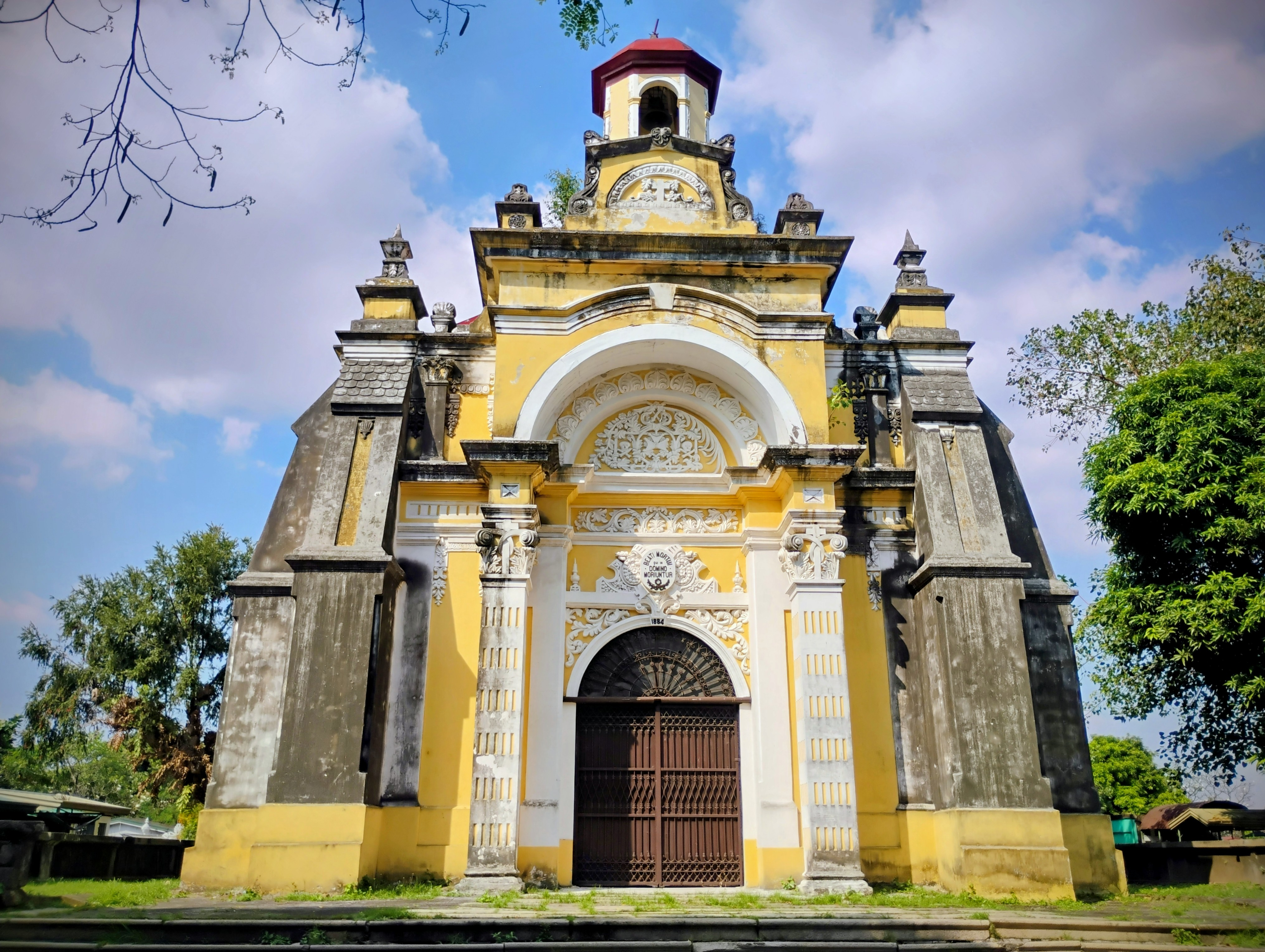
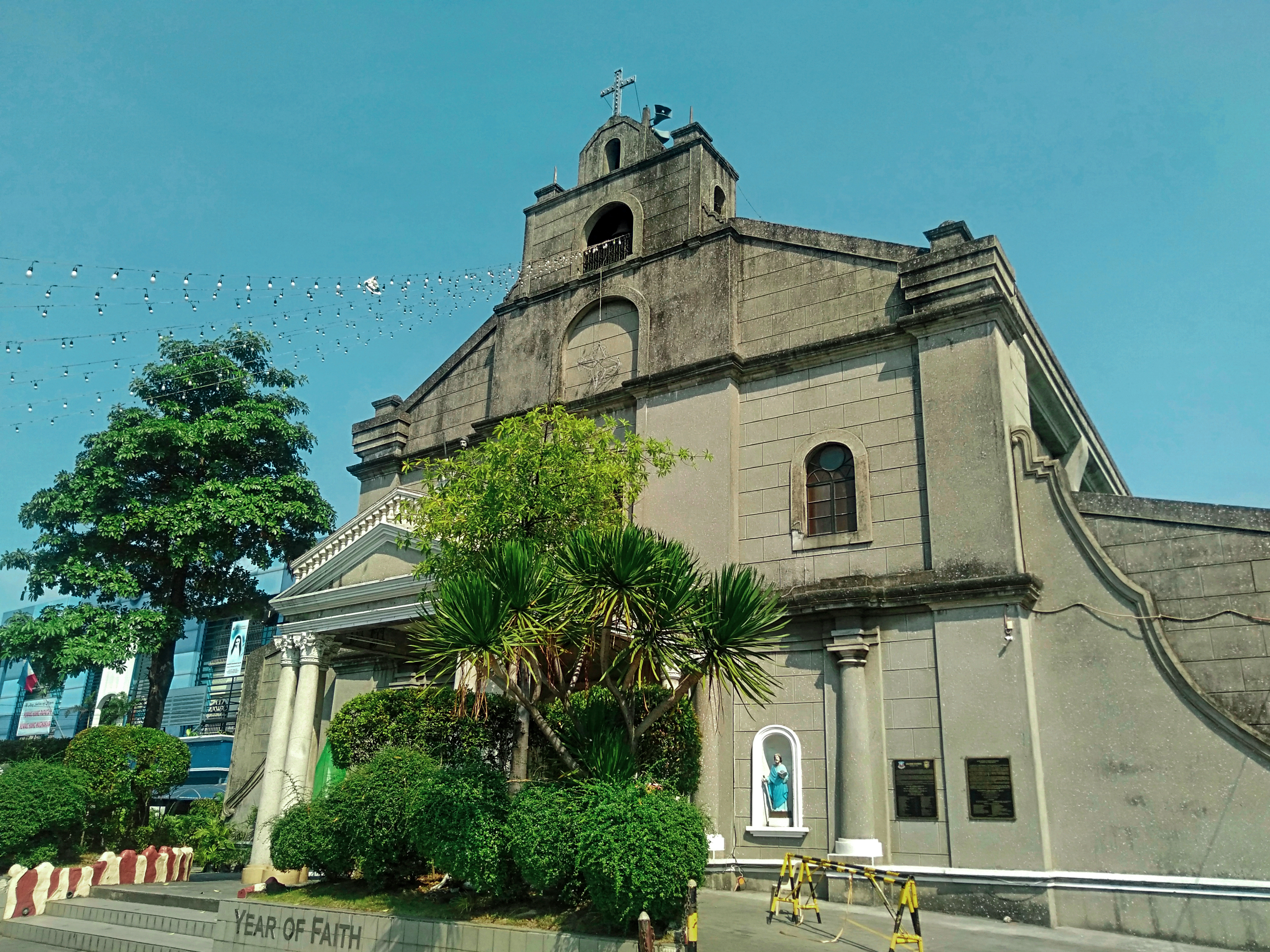
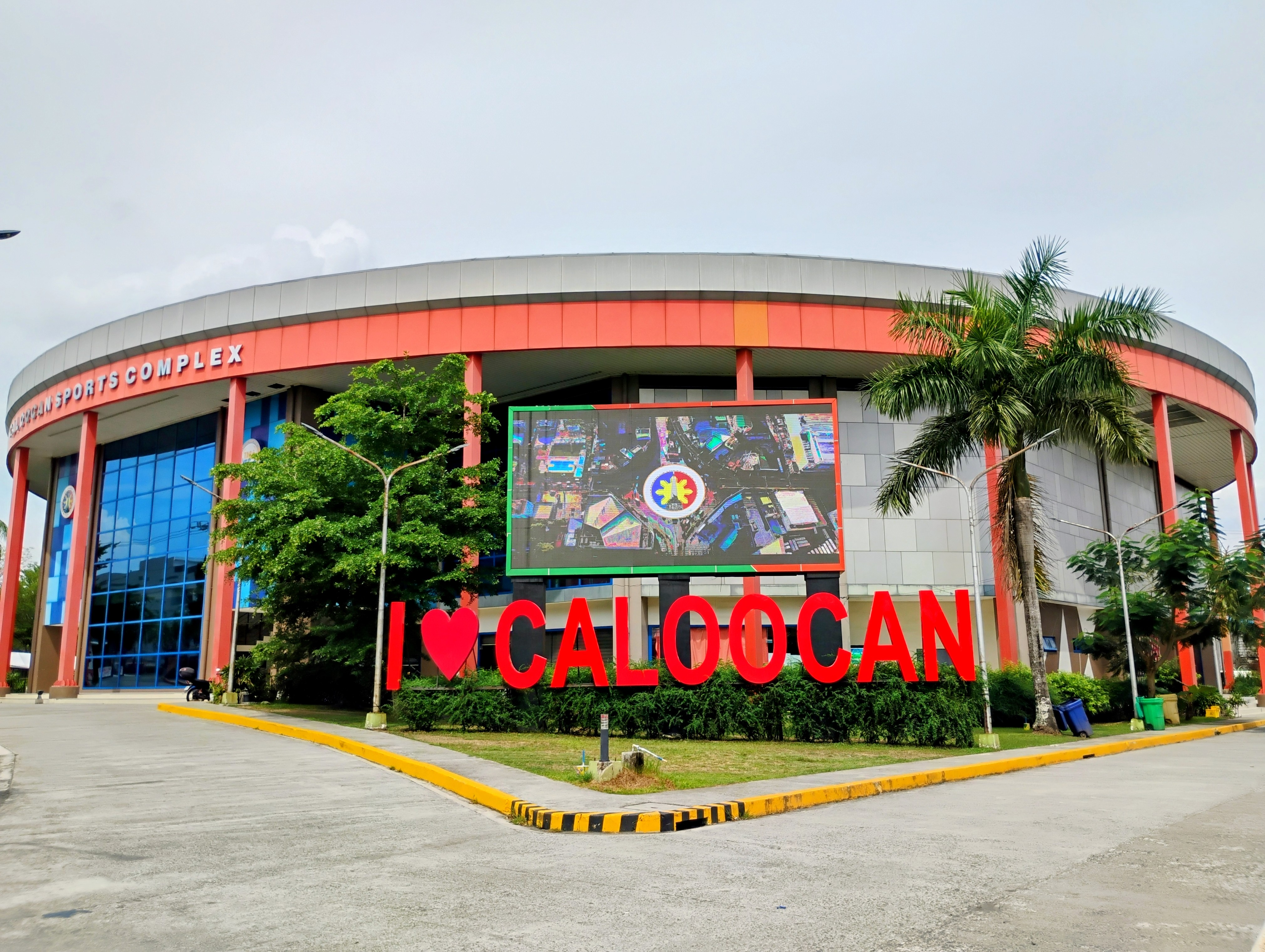
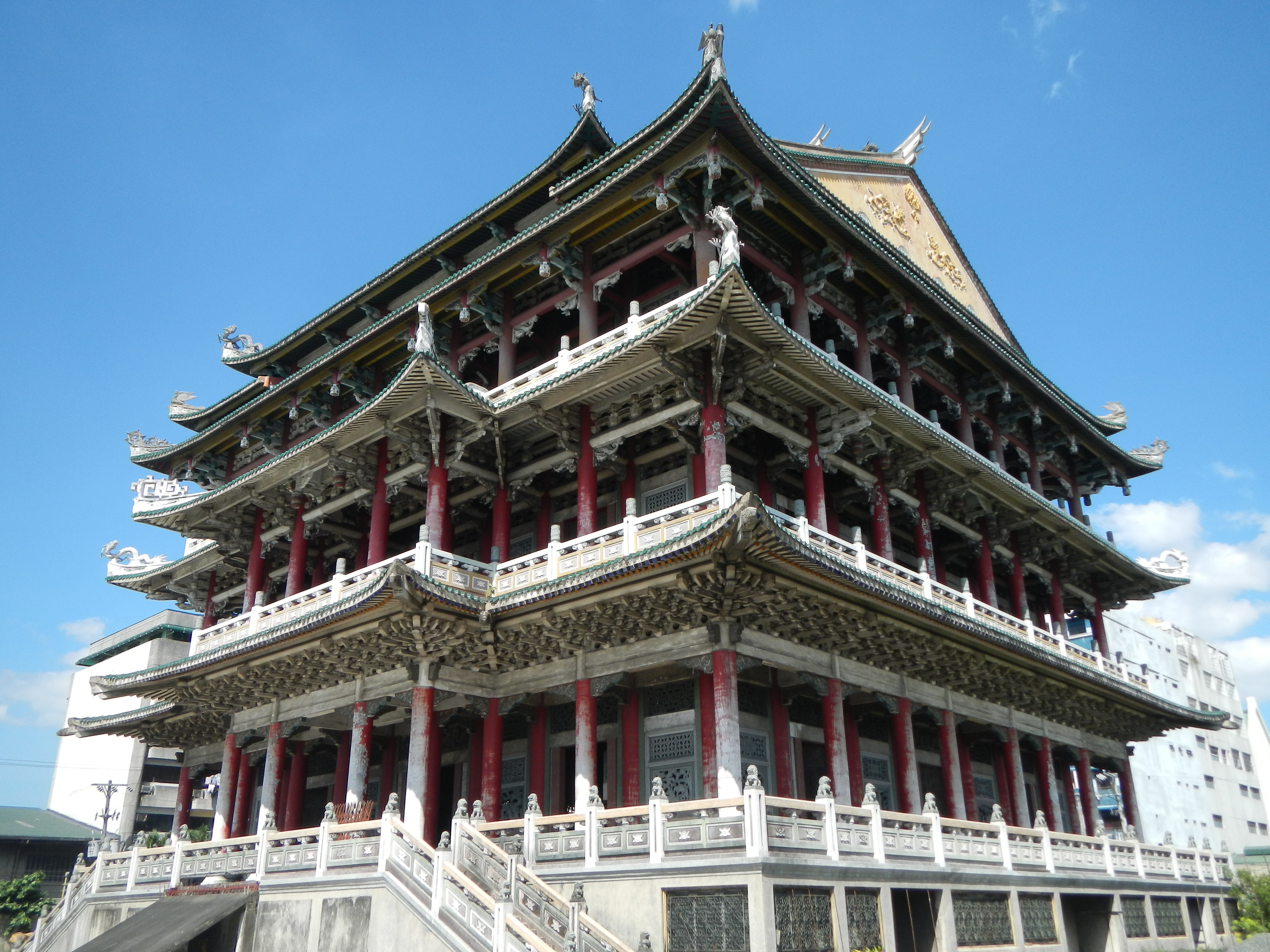
- Bonifacio Monument Caloocan City Hall La Loma Cemetery Caloocan Cathedral Caloocan Sports Complex Thai To Taoist Temple

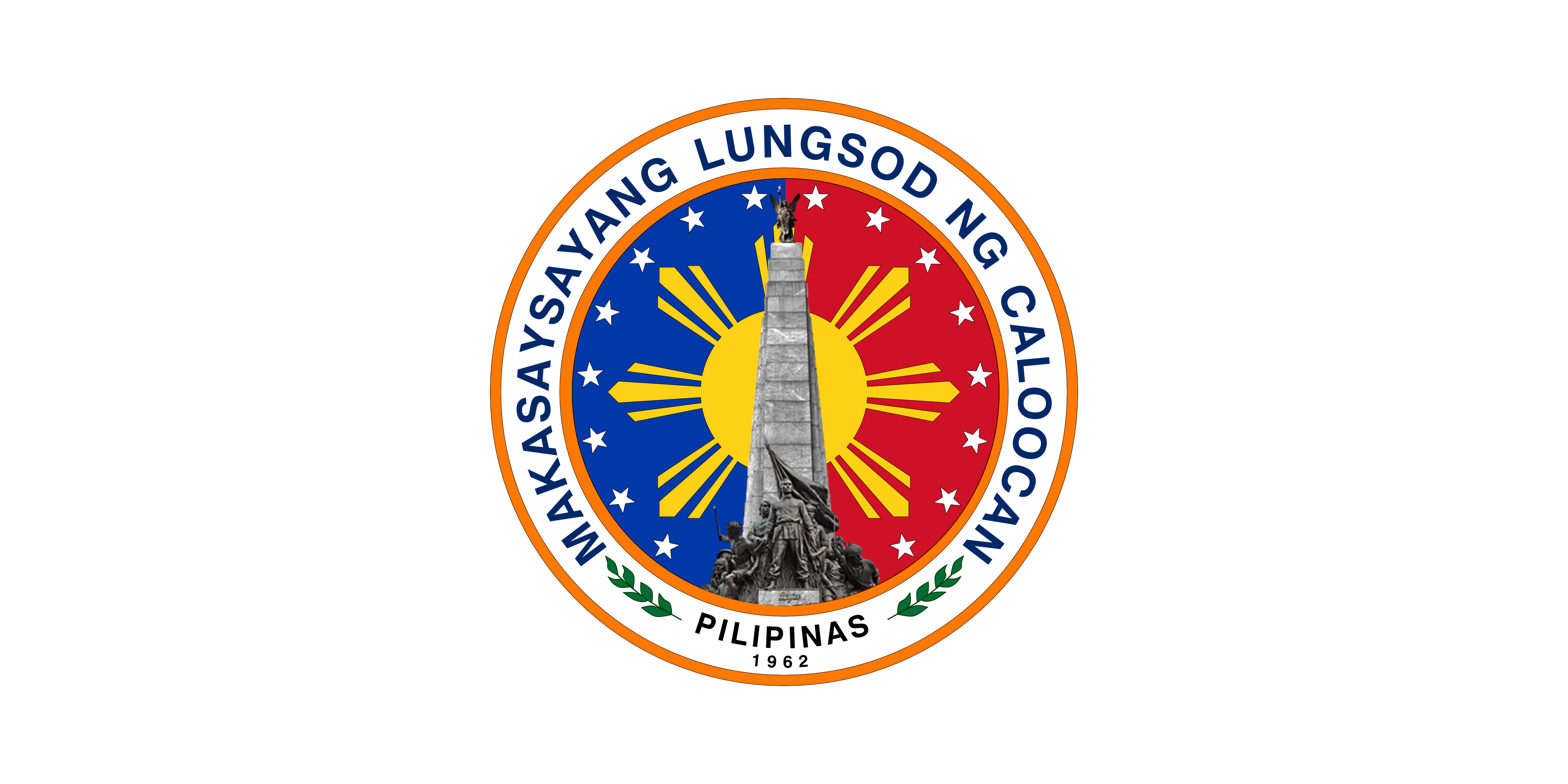
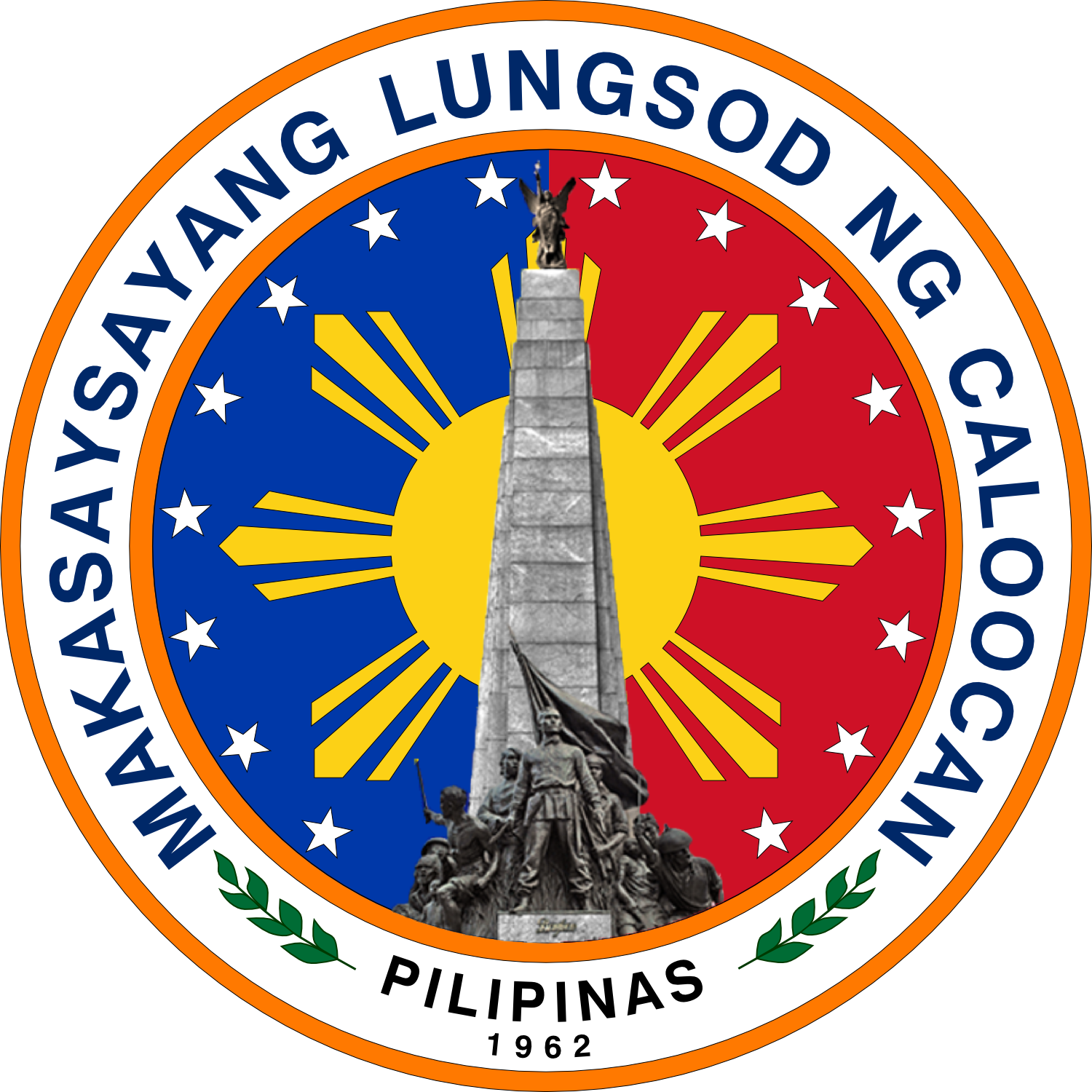
- Flag Seal
- Nickname: The Cradle of the Katipunan
- Motto: Aksyon at Malasakit
- Anthem: Mabuhay ang Caloocan (Long Live Caloocan)
- Map of Metro Manila with Caloocan highlighted
- Interactive map of Caloocan
- Location within the Philippines
- Coordinates: 14°39′N 120°58′E
- Country: Philippines
- Region: Metro Manila
- Province: none
- District: 1st to 3rd district
- Founded: 1815
- Cityhood: February 16, 1962
- Highly urbanized city: December 22, 1979
- Barangays: 193 (see Barangays)

Government
  - Type: Sangguniang Panlungsod
  - Mayor: Dale Gonzalo Malapitan (NP)
  - Vice Mayor: Anna Karina Teh-Limsico (NP)
  - Representatives: Oscar Malapitan (1st District) (NP); Edgar R. Erice (2nd District) (Liberal); Dean Asistio (3rd District) (Lakas)
  - City Council: Members: 1st District; Vincent Ryan R. Malapitan; Ray Christopher C. Adalem; Leah M. Bacolod; Orvince Howard A. Hernandez; Alexander M. Caralde; Jacqueline Z. Nubla; 2nd District; Jose Lorenzo T. Almeda; James Kenneth A. Aruelo; Alexander V. Mangasar; Constalene Carmen N. Asistio; Naomi Charmaine D. Quimpo; Carolyn C. Cunanan; 3rd District; Kingjohn Ericson M. Echiverri; Merwyn Lennon D. Abel; Aurora A. Henson Jr.; Patrick L. Prado; Carliza May A. Del Rosario; Theresita M. Ceralde; Liga ng mga Barangay President; Vergel J. De Vera; Sangguniang Kabataan Federation President; Bea C. Hedreyda
  - Electorate: 765,249 voters (2025)

Area
  - Total: 55.80 km^{2} (21.54 sq mi)
- Elevation: 30 m (98 ft)
- Highest elevation: 514 m (1,686 ft)
- Lowest elevation: −2 m (−6.6 ft)

Population (2024 census)
  - Total: 1,712,945
  - Rank: 4th
  - Density: 30,700/km^{2} (79,510/sq mi)
  - Households: 404,252

Economy
  - Income class: 1st city income class
  - Poverty incidence: 3% (2023)
  - Revenue: ₱ 9,751 million (2025)
  - Assets: ₱ 35,413 million (2025)
  - Expenditure: ₱ 9,123 million (2025)
  - Liabilities: ₱ 18,124 million (2025)

Service provider
  - Electricity: Manila Electric Company (Meralco)
- Time zone: UTC+8 (PST)
- PSGC: 137501000
- IDD : area code: +63 (0)02
- Native languages: Filipino
- Catholic dioceses: Roman Catholic Diocese of Kalookan; Roman Catholic Diocese of Novaliches
- Patron saint: St. Roch
- Website: caloocancity.gov.ph

Caloocan, officially the City of Caloocan (Filipino: Lungsod ng Caloocan/Kalookan; IPA: [kalɔˈʔokan]), is a highly urbanized city in the National Capital Region of the Philippines. According to the 2024 census, it has a population of 1,712,945 people, making it the fourth-most populous city in the Philippines.

Caloocan is divided into two geographical locations with a total combined area of 5,333.40 hectares (13,179.1 acres), a result of the 1949 expansion of Quezon City, which absorbed much of its territory. It was formerly part of the Province of Rizal in southern Luzon. It comprises what is known as the CAMANAVA area along with the cities of Malabon, Navotas and Valenzuela.

South Caloocan is bordered by Manila, Quezon City, Malabon, Navotas and Valenzuela. The presence of commercial and industrial activities combined with residential areas make it a highly urbanized central business district and a major urban center in the Northern District of Metropolitan Manila. North Caloocan shares its border with Quezon City and Valenzuela, Marilao, Meycauayan and San Jose del Monte in the province of Bulacan, and Rodriguez in the province of Rizal. It is composed of mostly residential subdivisions and extensive resettlement areas with scattered distribution of industrial estates mostly within road transit points and intersections.

== Etymology ==
Caloocan as a toponym comes from the Tagalog words lo-ok that translates to "bay", and sulok meaning "corner" as suggested by its location between the ends of the present-day Malabon and Tondo, Manila, and kaloók-lookan (or kaloób-looban) meaning "innermost area". The city's name is colloquially spelled Kalookan. Historically, it was called Kaloogan, meaning "interior territory," which evolved from the old Tagalog word "loog" (synonymous with "loob," meaning "inside"). The "g" sound could have shifted to the "k" sound in Tagalog phonetics (e.g. baksak → bagsak), leading to the present name.

There is a mixed preference over the preferred spelling of the city's name. Variation and apparent confusion over the spelling arose around the early 1970s, when a resolution was adopted by the municipal board, requiring the city departments to use the name "Kalookan." However, implementation of the resolution was interrupted by the nationwide imposition of martial law in late September 1972. In 1988, Councilor Aurora Asistio-Henson proposed Resolution No. 006, aiming to promote Filipino nationalism by enforcing the spelling "Kalookan" in all city departments and establishments. The change was opposed by residents, businesses, and officials, with former representative and vice mayor Virgilio Robles deeming it illegal, and asserting the spelling "Caloocan" as per the city charter. Although confusion persists, the general inclination in the city is towards "Caloocan," as evidenced by the official logo and favored by many barangays, schools, and newspapers. However, some entities, like the Directories of the Philippines Corporation, prefer the spelling "Kalookan."

== History ==
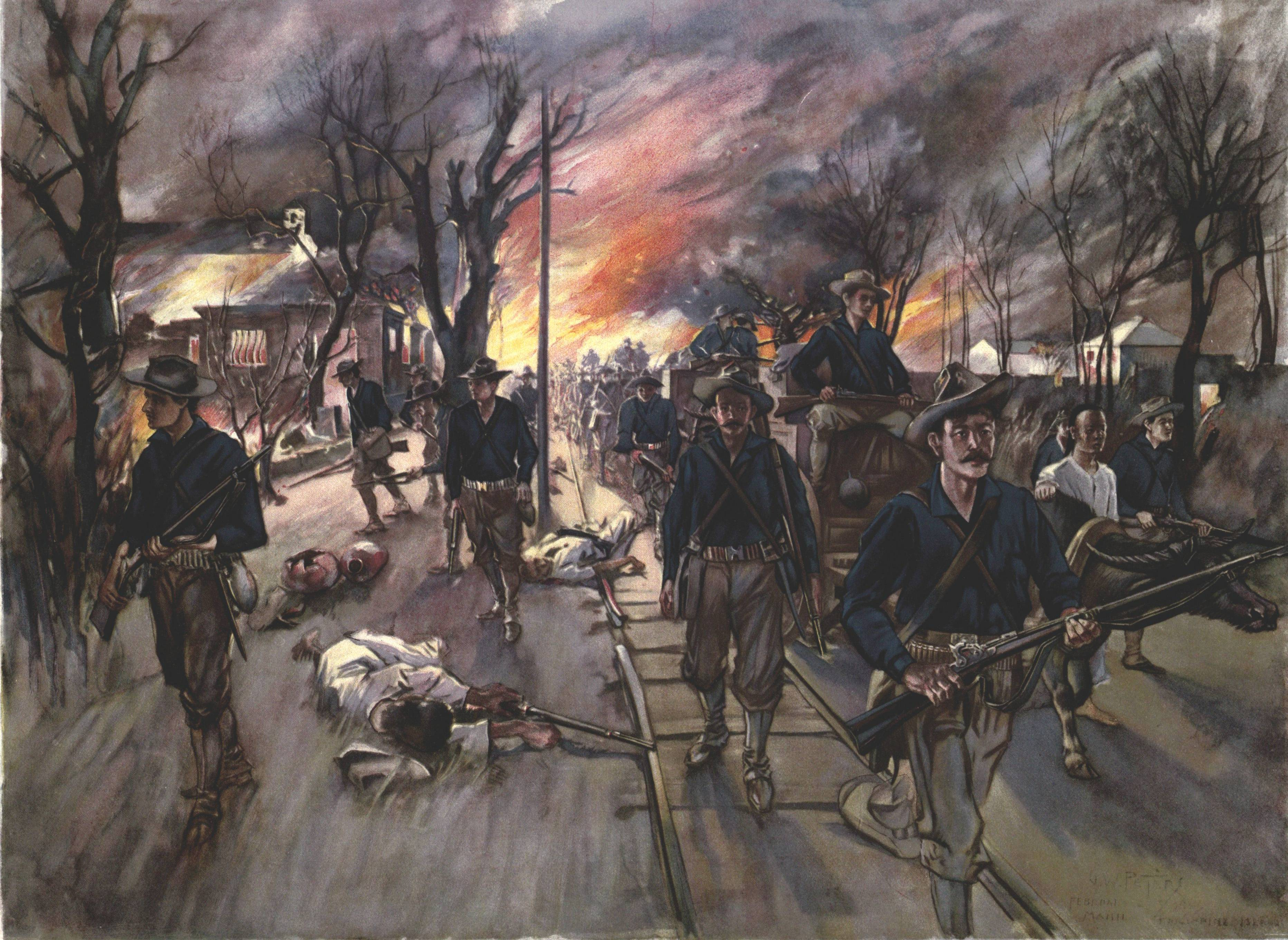
The ammunition train and reserves of the 20th Kansas Volunteers, Col. Frederick R. Funston, marching through Caloocan at night after the battle of February 10.

=== Spanish colonial era ===
Originally, Caloocan was the area where the old town of Tondo and Tambobong met, located along the shores of Dagát-Dagatan, a crescent-shaped inland lagoon to the west. The settlement along the shore was known as "Aromahan", or "Espina" to the Spaniards, and separated from Manila Bay by a narrow ridge from Tondo towards an opening in Kinabutasan leading to the sea.

By the late 1700s, the fishermen of Aromahan have expanded towards a hill east of Dagat-Dagatan. This naturally stony hill was called "Kaloogan", meaning "interior territory." With Aromahan relegated to the periphery, this hilltop area was also settled by oppressed people from Tondo, becoming the new center of the community by 1802. To the east was a vast stretch of cogon-covered land. Eventually called "Kalaanan", meaning "flat grassland" in old Tagalog, this area is now generally known as Grace Park.

Caloocan became a municipality when it was separated from Tondo in 1815. Its original territory extended to the foothills of Marikina, San Mateo and Montalban to the east; Tinajeros, Tanza, and Tala rivers to the north; San Juan del Monte, San Francisco del Monte, Sampalok, Santa Cruz and Tondo in the south; and Dagat-dagatan and Aromahan to the west. The local government building was set up on the relatively well-settled portion just above Libis Espina. The old Aromahan chapel was finally abandoned and a new church was built facing the municipal hall. To escape the Spanish authorities, many from the area abandoned the town proper and sought refuge in the grasslands of Balintawak and Pugad-Lawin, in which the people fought the landlords of Hacienda de Maysilo for terrestrial rights, which went on for almost a hundred years.

In 1888, the steam tranvia preceded that linking the town to the capital and the then coastal towns of Malabon and Navotas. In 1891, the Manila Railroad Company opened a railway station in the town.

==== The Philippine revolution ====
Caloocan is historically significant because it was the center of activities for the Katipunan, the secret militant society that launched the Philippine Revolution against the Spanish Empire. In a house in Caloocan, secret meetings were held by Andrés Bonifacio and his men, and it was in the city's perimeters where the first armed encounter took place between the Katipunan and the Spaniards. The revolution erupted after the "Cry of Balintawak" led by Bonifacio against Spain on August 30, 1896.

=== American invasion era ===
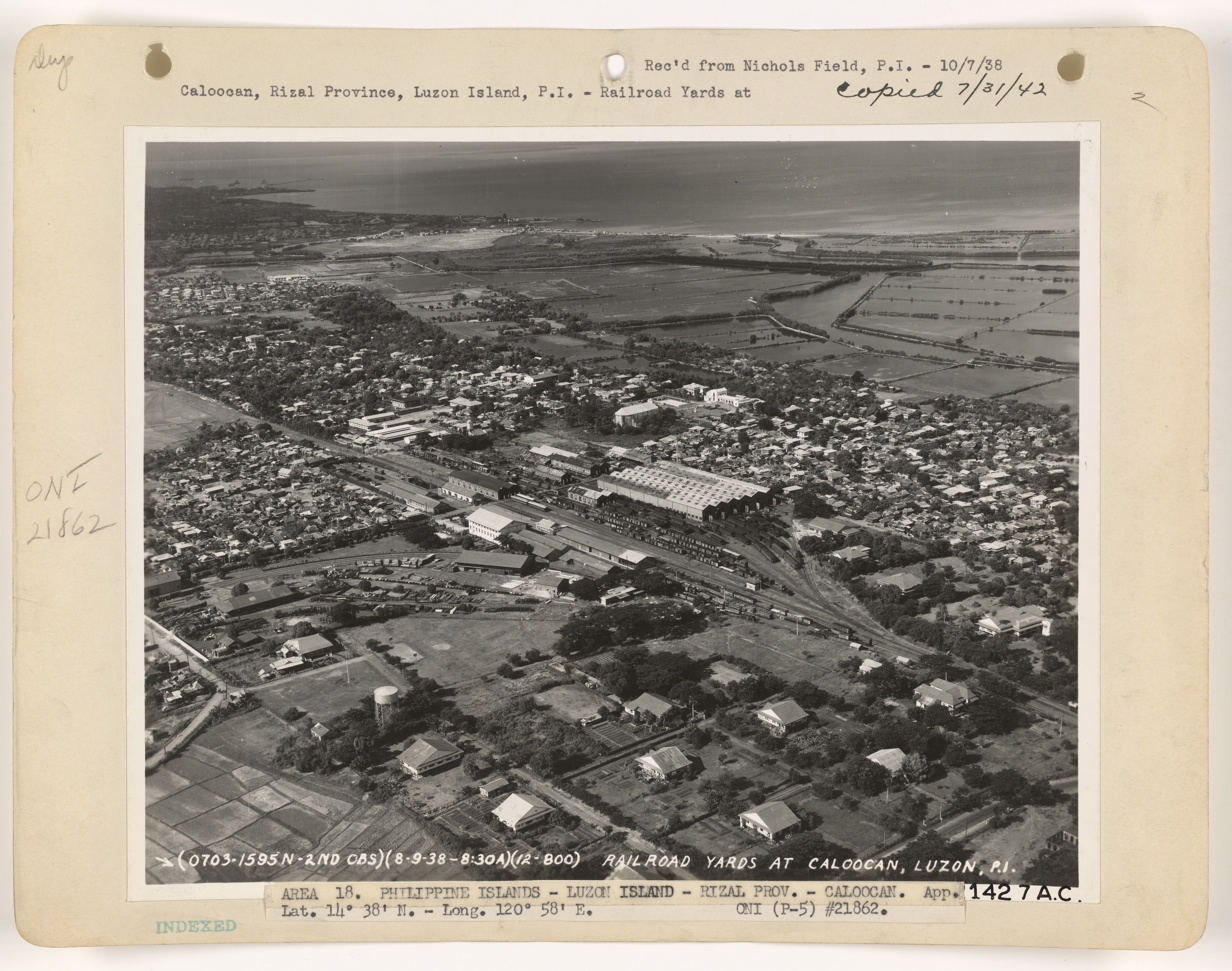
Aerial view of Caloocan, 1938

In 1899, the people of Caloocan showed resistance to coming to terms with the Americans, who were bent on extending their supremacy over the country. The men of Caloocan fought the new invaders on February 23, 1899, however victory eluded the local troops on the pretext of Antonio Luna's rift with Emilio Aguinaldo's loyalists. The city then saw heavy fighting in the Philippine–American War, at the Battle of Caloocan and the Second Battle of Caloocan.

In 1901, under the American regime, Caloocan, previously a part of the province of Manila, became one of the municipalities of the newly established province of Rizal. Due to the consolidation of several municipalities in 1903, Novaliches, then an independent municipality, became part of Caloocan pursuant to Act No. 942, as amended by Act Nos. 984 and 1008 of the Philippine Commission.

=== Japanese occupation era ===
In 1942, Caloocan was one of the municipalities of Rizal merged alongside Manila and Quezon City to form the City of Greater Manila as an emergency measure by President Manuel L. Quezon. It regained its pre-war status as a municipality of Rizal when the City of Greater Manila was dissolved effective August 1, 1945.

=== Cityhood ===
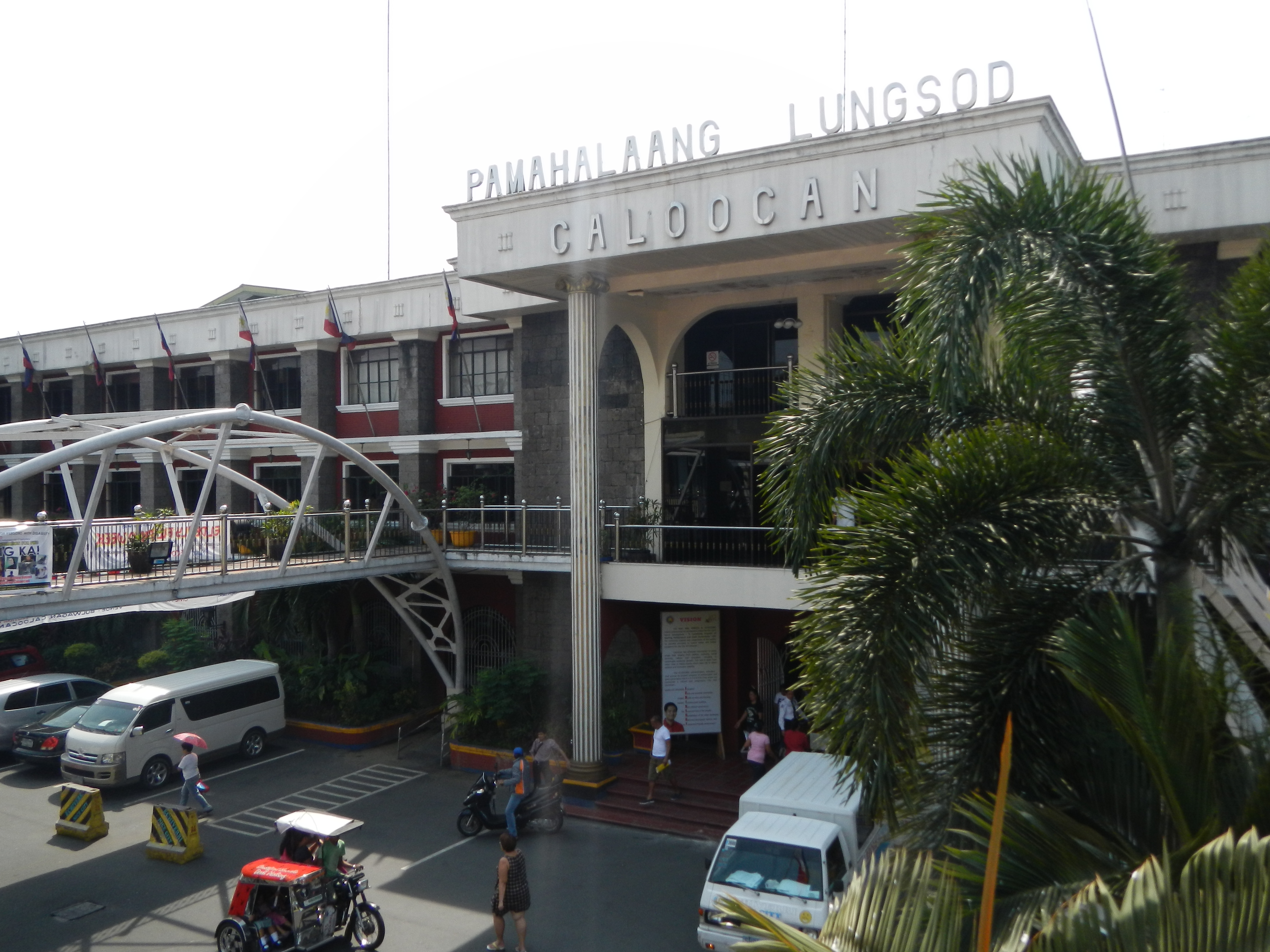
The old Caloocan City Hall in Poblacion district was the seat of local government for Caloocan from 1952 to 2017.

In 1961, after Republic Act No. 3278 was approved by the Philippine Congress, a plebiscite was conducted. Caloocan was officially inducted into cityhood on February 16, 1962.

Caloocan remained a city of the province of Rizal until November 7, 1975, when it became a part of the National Capital Region or Metro Manila, by virtue of Presidential Decree No. 824.

=== Territorial changes ===
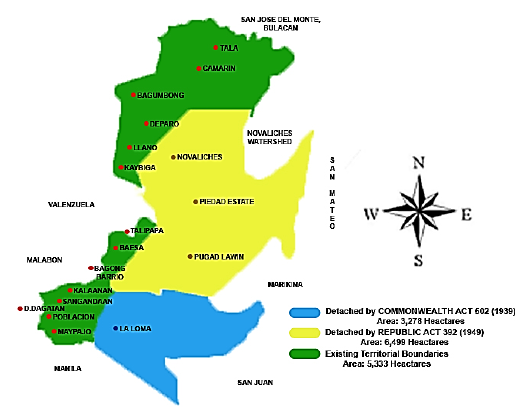
Territorial changes of Caloocan. Existing territorial boundaries Detached by Commonwealth Act No. 502 (1939) Detached by Republic Act No. 392 (1949)

Caloocan once encompassed a much larger, contiguous area. The districts of Balintawak, La Loma and Novaliches were once part of Caloocan. Balintawak is a historic district because it was the original site of the "Cry of Pugad Lawin" (Unang Sigaw sa Balintawak) at a location called "Kang-kong" near Tandang Sora's house. Novaliches was an expansive sector with some hillsides that served as meeting places and hideouts for Andrés Bonifacio and the Katipunan.

During the American occupation, there was a consolidation of several municipalities. Caloocan annexed the neighboring town of Novaliches on October 12, 1903, as stated in the Act No. 942 of the Philippine Commission, bringing its total area to about 1,500 hectares (3,700 acres). When Commonwealth Act No. 502 created Quezon City in 1939, Caloocan ceded 1,500 hectares of land from the barrios or sitios of Bagubantay (Bago Bantay), Balintauac (Balintawák), Balingasa, Kaingin, Kangkong (present-day Apolonio Samson), La Loma, Malamig, Matalahib (present-day Santo Domingo), Masambong, Galas, San Isidro, San José, Santol and Tatalon. Instead of opposing the transfer, Caloocan residents willingly gave the land in the belief it will benefit the country's new capital city.

However, in 1949, Congress passed Republic Act No. 392, which redefined the Caloocan–Quezon City boundary. The barrios of Baesa, Sangandaan, Talipapâ, San Bartolomé, Pasong Tamó, Novaliches Proper (poblacion), Banlat (present-day Tandang Sora), Kabuyao, Pugad Lawin, Bagbag, Pasong Putik, which once belonged to Novaliches and had an area of about 8,100 hectares (20,000 acres), were excised from Caloocan. The remaining portion of the Novaliches is now called North Caloocan. This split Caloocan into two parts: a more urbanized southern section and a suburban-rural northern section, which is part of Novaliches.

In 1957, the sitio of Bagbaguin was separated from the barrio of Caybiga (Kaybiga) and converted into a distinct barrio known as Barrio Bagbaguin.

=== Reorganization attempts ===
Issues concerning budget and handling village governments led to attempts to restructure the city's barangays since late 1980s. A bill authored by city's 1st district representative Virgilio Robles, which aimed to reduce the barangays from 188 to 60—thirty in each legislative district—was approved as Republic Act (RA) No. 6714 on February 28, 1989. A plebiscite was held on March 10; with a turnout of only 10% of 384,981 registered voters, majority of the participated voters reportedly opposed the proposal.

On the other hand, residents of Bagong Silang (Barangay 176), then the country's most populous barangay and was used as a relocation site for informal settlers, appealed the partition of the barangay since 2013. On April 3, 2024, President Bongbong Marcos signed RA No. 11993 which would divide the village into six. This was ratified by the majority of voters in a plebiscite held on August 31.

=== Philippine drug war ===
Police chief	Date of assignment
Bartolome R. Bustamante	November 4, 2014
Johnson C. Almazan	July 2016
Chito G. Bersaluna	February 2017
Jemar D. Modequillo	September 4, 2017
Restituto B. Arcangel	March 27, 2018
Noel R. Flores	May 30, 2019
Dario M. Menor	February 7, 2020
Samuel V. Mina Jr.	October 23, 2020

Throughout Oscar Malapitan's mayorship from 2013 to 2022, he regularly boasted of a decreased crime rate in Caloocan. However, the Peace Research Institute Frankfurt (PRIF) noted in 2020 that Malapitan's mayorship was characterized with a passivity towards President Rodrigo Duterte's war on drugs during its first year (2016–2017), with Malapitan asking the local branch of the Philippine National Police (PNP) to take charge of crime control and work vigorously against illegal drugs, which PRIF claimed to have "resulted in a huge spike of deadly police violence" and "excessive levels of vigilantism" during this period. Many of the high-profile incidents in Duterte's national drug war occurred in Caloocan, including the murders of Luis Bonifacio and his son Gabriel in 2016, the murder of jeepney driver Michael Lee in March 2017, and the murders of Kian delos Santos, Carl Arnaiz and Reynaldo de Guzman in August 2017. Barangay 188, known to be a long-time hotspot for illegal drugs, saw its barangay captain Edres Domato, alleged to be connected to the drug trade, assassinated by motorcycle-riding gunmen on June 25, 2016, one of the earliest casualties in the drug war; all but one councilor of the barangay were eventually assassinated. City councilors were also discouraged from attending the wakes of drug war victims and providing burial assistance to their families.

On February 5, 2017, several North Caloocan residents organized a protest march in response to the massacre of eight people (including a pregnant woman and her unborn child) by motorcycle-riding assailants in a shanty area of Barangay 176 on December 28, 2016; it has since been deemed the country's first organized resistance effort by residents affected by the national drug war.

Bishop Pablo Virgilio David of the Diocese of Kalookan met with Malapitan, lawyer Sikini Labastilla, and the city police chief, all three of whom were members of the Caloocan City Anti-Drug Abuse Council (CADAC), sometime in 2017 to discuss how to better facilitate rehabilitation and drug prevention in the city during the drug war, which lead to the establishment of the Caloocan Anti-Drug Abuse Office (CADAO/OCADA) in early September through an ordinance written by councilor Rose Mercado. Caloocan also passed Ordinance No. 702, sponsored by councilors Mercado, Onet Henson and Alou Nubla, in early September that implemented a new curfew for minors (from 10 p.m. to 5 a.m.) and placed the liability on their parents in response to the police murders of delos Santos, Arnaiz and de Guzman. By mid-September, Caloocan's entire police force was relieved from duty by PNP Chief Oscar Albayalde, despite it receiving the award for Metro Manila's Best City Police Station from the National Capital Region Police Office (NCRPO) a month earlier; only newly assigned police chief Jemar Modequillo and his administration deputy were retained. Although Modequillo attempted to instill discipline in the city's police force and reduce the number of deaths in police operations in the months after his assignment, he was characterized by his support for Duterte's drug war and observance of his mandate.

In March 2018, a spate of drive-by shootings perpetrated by pairs of motorcyclists, locally known as "riding-in-tandem", occurred in the city. Modequillo was then relieved as police chief on March 26 for his failure to investigate and solve the shootings. By next month, councilors Mercado, Nubla and PJ Malonzo proposed an ordinance that would ban motorcycle-riding male tandems, but upon the protest of motorcycle clubs, however, mayor Malapitan stated that changes will first be made to the proposed ordinance before he signs it into law.

On May 1, 2024, a columbarium named Dambana ng Paghilom (lit. 'shrine for healing') was inaugurated in La Loma Cemetery to serve as a memorial for the victims of the Philippine drug war.

== Geography ==
Caloocan is divided into two non-contiguous areas with a total combined area of 53.334 square kilometers (20.592 sq mi). South Caloocan, with an area of 13.625 square kilometers (5.261 sq mi), is bordered on the south by Manila, on the east by Quezon City, on the west by Navotas, on the north-northwest by Malabon, and on the north by Valenzuela. North Caloocan, with an area of 39.709 square kilometers (15.332 sq mi), shares its border on the south-southeast by Quezon City, on the southwest by Valenzuela, on the north by Marilao, Meycauayan and San Jose del Monte in the province of Bulacan, and on the northeast by Rodriguez in the province of Rizal.

=== Topography ===
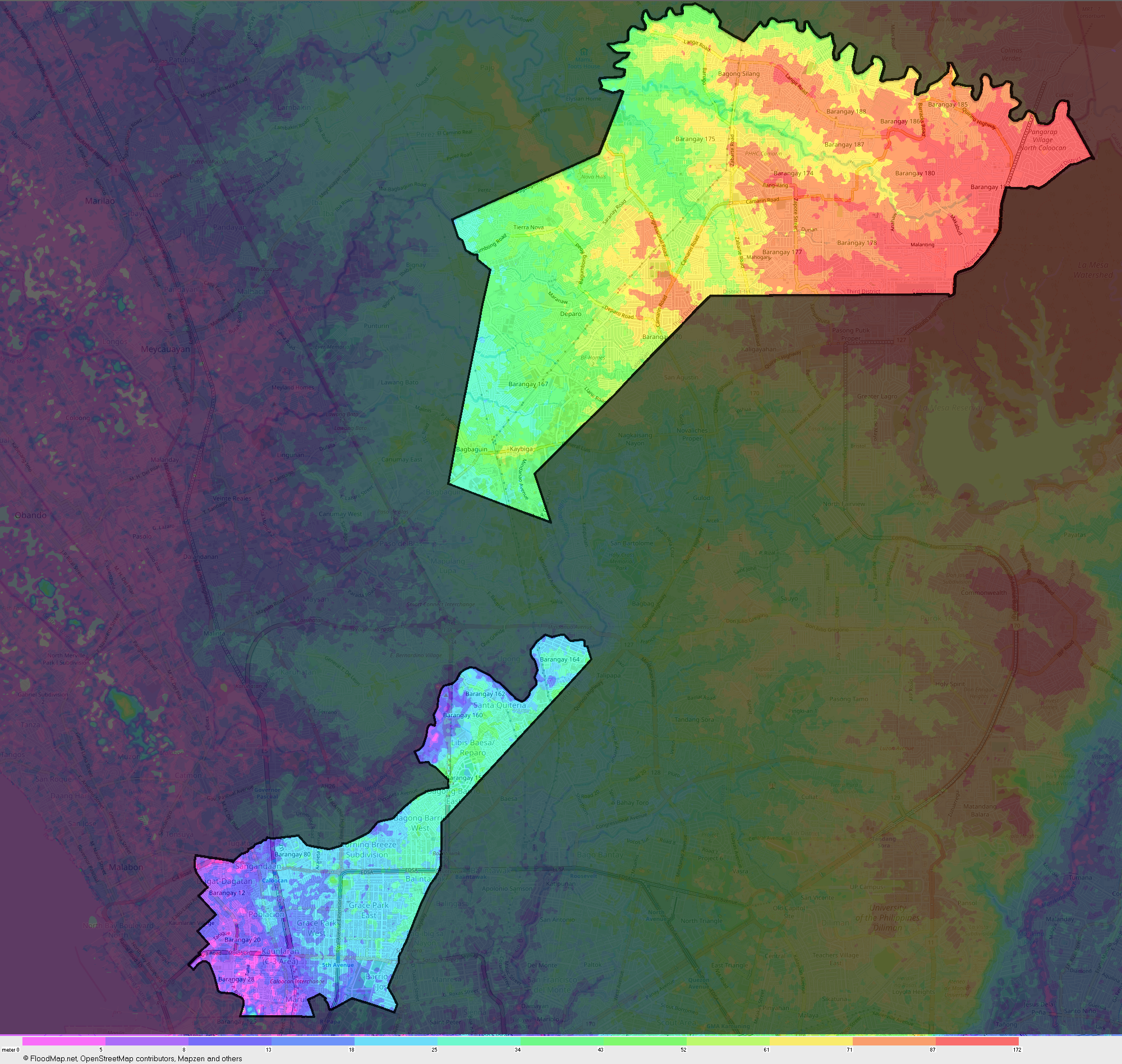
Elevation map of south Caloocan

South Caloocan, where most commercial and industrial establishments are found, lies on generally flat and highly accessible land, with slopes ranging from 0–3%. The topography gradually changes from gently to moderately sloping to rolling along the North Luzon Expressway, with slopes ranging from 3–19%. The highest point at 35.00 meters (114.83 ft) above sea level can be found in this area, while the lowest point is in the southern part of Dagat-Dagatan at about 0.993 meters (3 ft 3.1 in) above mean sea level.

North Caloocan is characterized by gently to steeply undulating to rolling topography with slopes ranging from 3–18%, mostly seen in the northern and central portion, gradually transforming into a southward trend of flat lands down to the southwestern tip of the boundary. Being accessible to major roads, many industrial and residential subdivisions have been developed on this near-level land.

=== Geology ===
The geologic formation of the two portions of Caloocan varies in type and characteristics. and are specifically classified as quaternary alluvium, tuff and tuffaceous sediment, pyroclastic flow deposit, and conglomerates. The formation on the eastern half of Metropolitan Manila extending to the coastline of Manila Bay and including a greater part of South Caloocan is the quaternary alluvium, which consists of unconsolidated stream-deposited sediments that include sand, silt, clay and gravel.

Eastward of South Caloocan, large areas consisting of tuff and tuffaceous sediment can be traced, spreading towards the whole eastern side of Metro Manila. Pyroclastic flow deposit or igneous rocks formed by the lithification of ash flow are likewise present in some northern fringes of South Caloocan and in most parts of North Caloocan. On the northeast borders of North Caloocan, conglomerate rocks were traced, crossing Tala Estate and extending to the province of Bulacan and the La Mesa Watershed.

Soil found in both areas of Caloocan predominantly falls under the Novaliches Series, covering 96% of the total land area of the city. The Novaliches Series is composed of reddish brown soil, friable in consistency and granular in structure. Spherical concretions are present in the subsoil and underneath is tuffaceous material of varying degrees of disintegration and weathering. This tuffaceous material is exposed by extensive erosion in some places.

=== Surface drainages ===
Caloocan has surface waters that either have natural courses (creeks and rivers) or were constructed to serve as drainages to remove excess water from soil surfaces. South Caloocan has about 5.0-kilometer-long (3.1 mi) open drainage canals that serve mainly the reclamation area comprising Kaunlaran Village (Dagat-Dagatan Development Project) and nearly 11.3-kilometer-long (7.0 mi) natural surface water coursing through the different natural river systems. These include the Tinajeros-Tullahan River along the Caloocan–Valenzuela boundary; Maligaya Creek within La Loma Cemetery and crossing Rizal Avenue Extension; Casili Creek which terminates in Estero de Maypajo, and Cantarilla/Panaca Creek along the Caloocan–Malabon boundary. In North Caloocan, all surface waters consist of natural streams, the longest being the Meycauayan-Marilao River dividing Caloocan and Bulacan. Others include the Bagong Silang River, Tala, Camarin, Pasong Malapad, and Bagumbong Creeks crossing multiple subdivisions, for 52.7 kilometers (32.7 mi) long within the city's territorial boundaries.

=== Climate ===
The climate is a tropical savanna climate (Koppen: Aw), with most of the total rainfall occurring within a lengthy and abundant wet season between May and October, but the climate is not wet not enough for it to be classified as a tropical monsoon climate (Koppen: Am).

Climate data for Caloocan
Month	Jan	Feb	Mar	Apr	May	Jun	Jul	Aug	Sep	Oct	Nov	Dec	Year
Mean daily maximum °C (°F)	29 (84)	30 (86)	32 (90)	34 (93)	33 (91)	31 (88)	30 (86)	29 (84)	29 (84)	30 (86)	30 (86)	29 (84)	31 (87)
Mean daily minimum °C (°F)	20 (68)	20 (68)	21 (70)	23 (73)	24 (75)	25 (77)	24 (75)	24 (75)	24 (75)	23 (73)	22 (72)	21 (70)	23 (73)
Average precipitation mm (inches)	7 (0.3)	7 (0.3)	9 (0.4)	21 (0.8)	101 (4.0)	152 (6.0)	188 (7.4)	170 (6.7)	159 (6.3)	115 (4.5)	47 (1.9)	29 (1.1)	1,005 (39.7)
Average rainy days	3.3	3.5	11.1	8.1	18.9	23.5	26.4	25.5	24.5	19.6	10.4	6.4	181.2
Source: Meteoblue

=== Barangays ===
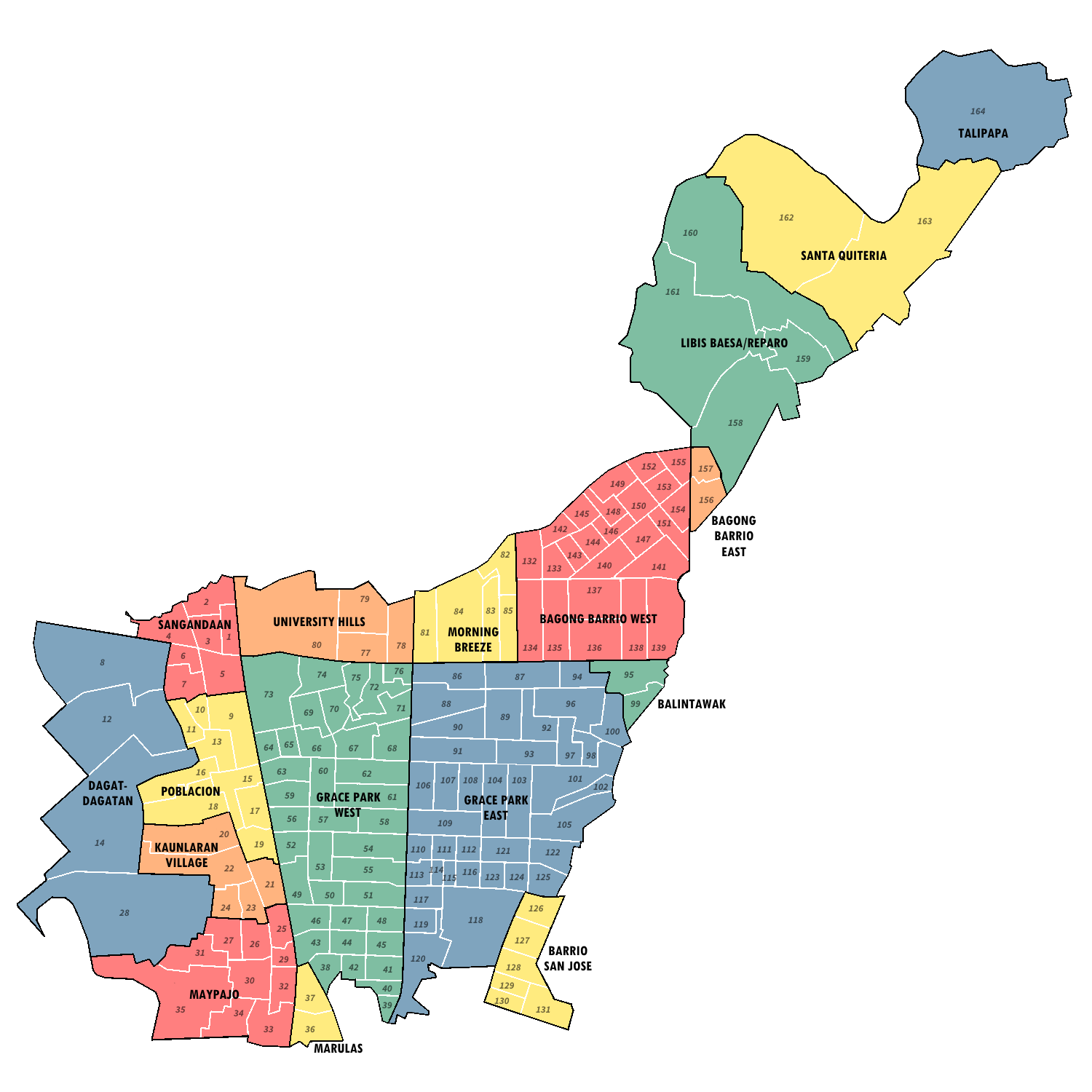
Barangays of South Caloocan with corresponding area names

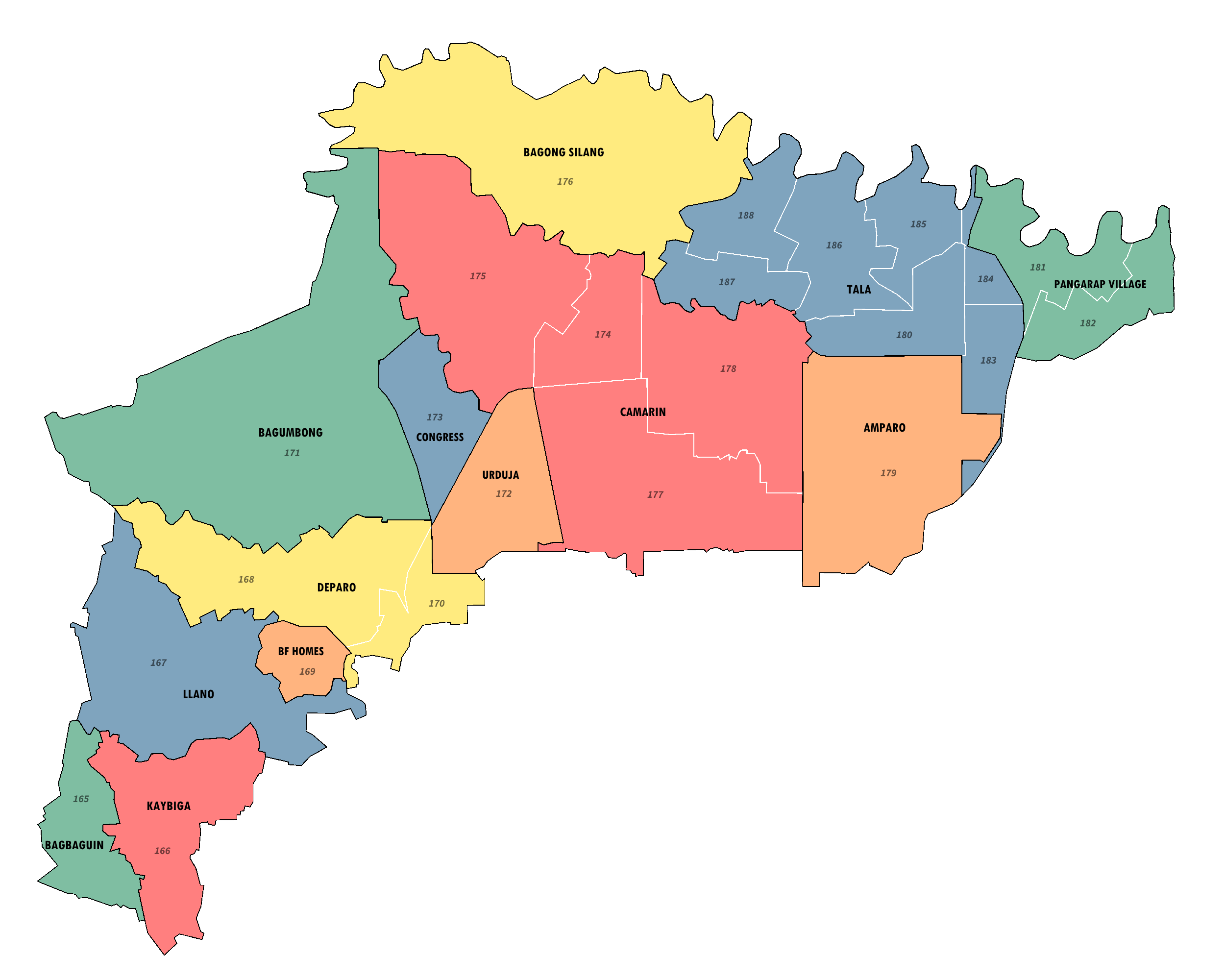
Barangays of North Caloocan with corresponding area names (before the 2024 split of Bagong Silang)

Currently, Caloocan has 193 barangays divided into 3 legislative districts. The 1st District is composed of 64 barangays, which include Barangays 1 to 4, 77 to 85, 132 to 164 in South Caloocan and Barangays 165 to 177 in North Caloocan. The 2nd District is composed of 118 barangays, which include Barangays 5 to 76 and 86 to 131, all in South Caloocan. 3rd District, which was created in 2021, includes 11 barangays in North Caloocan that were formerly part of the 1st District, which include Barangays 178 to 188.

The city uses a hybrid system for its barangays, further dividing the cities into 16 zones. Among the cities in Metro Manila, only Manila, Pasay and Caloocan implement the so-called "Zone Systems". A zone is a group of barangays in a district. Although a zone is considered a subdivision in the local government units, the people do not elect a leader for the zone in a popular election similar to the normal barangay or local elections as the system is merely for statistical purposes. Furthermore, all barangays have corresponding numbers but only a few—mostly in Caloocan's northern part—have corresponding names. However, the names of barrios and districts do not necessarily coincide with the perimeters of barangays. The barangays in southern Caloocan are generally smaller compared to their northern counterparts.

Prior to its split in 2024, Barangay 176 or Bagong Silang was the most populous barangay in the country with a population of 261,729 people or 15.75% of the total population of Caloocan. This was due to the continuous influx of informal settler families through relocation programs since the 1970s. As a result, there have been calls by residents to subdivide Bagong Silang into seven distinct barangays. Finally, a plebiscite held on August 31, 2024, resulted in the division of Bagong Silang into six distinct barangays: 176-A, 176-B, 176-C, 176-D, 176-E, and 176-F.

Barangay 76, meanwhile, is the least populous barangay in Metro Manila with zero population as of 2024. It used to be an informal settlement and its entire 2.8-hectare (6.9-acre) area is now predominated by retail buildings.

Caloocan (South)
Barangay	District	Area/Name
Zone 1
Barangay 1	1st	Sangandaan
Barangay 2	1st	Sangandaan
Barangay 3	1st	Sangandaan
Barangay 4	1st	Sangandaan
Barangay 5	2nd	Sangandaan
Barangay 6	2nd	Sangandaan
Barangay 7	2nd	Sangandaan
Barangay 8	2nd	Dagat-Dagatan
Barangay 9	2nd	Poblacion
Barangay 10	2nd	Poblacion
Barangay 11	2nd	Poblacion
Barangay 12	2nd	Dagat-Dagatan
Zone 2
Barangay 13	2nd	Poblacion
Barangay 14	2nd	Dagat-Dagatan
Barangay 15	2nd	Poblacion
Barangay 16	2nd	Poblacion
Barangay 17	2nd	Poblacion
Barangay 18	2nd	Poblacion
Barangay 19	2nd	Poblacion
Barangay 20	2nd	Kaunlaran Village (C-3 Road)
Barangay 21	2nd	Kaunlaran Village (C-3 Road)
Barangay 22	2nd	Kaunlaran Village (C-3 Road)
Barangay 23	2nd	Kaunlaran Village (C-3 Road)
Barangay 24	2nd	Kaunlaran Village (C-3 Road)
Zone 3
Barangay 25	2nd	Maypajo
Barangay 26	2nd	Maypajo
Barangay 27	2nd	Maypajo
Barangay 28	2nd	Dagat-Dagatan
Barangay 29	2nd	Maypajo
Barangay 30	2nd	Maypajo
Barangay 31	2nd	Maypajo
Barangay 32	2nd	Maypajo
Barangay 33	2nd	Maypajo
Barangay 34	2nd	Maypajo
Barangay 35	2nd	Maypajo
Zone 4
Barangay 36	2nd	Marulas
Barangay 37	2nd	Marulas
Barangay 38	2nd	Grace Park West
Barangay 39	2nd	Grace Park West
Barangay 40	2nd	Grace Park West
Barangay 41	2nd	Grace Park West
Barangay 42	2nd	Grace Park West
Barangay 43	2nd	Grace Park West (3rd Avenue)
Barangay 44	2nd	Grace Park West (3rd Avenue)
Barangay 45	2nd	Grace Park West (3rd Avenue)
Barangay 46	2nd	Grace Park West (4th Avenue)
Barangay 47	2nd	Grace Park West (4th Avenue)
Barangay 48	2nd	Grace Park West (4th Avenue)
Zone 5
Barangay 49	2nd	Grace Park West (5th Avenue)
Barangay 50	2nd	Grace Park West (5th Avenue)
Barangay 51	2nd	Grace Park West (5th Avenue)
Barangay 52	2nd	Grace Park West (7th Avenue)
Barangay 53	2nd	Grace Park West (7th Avenue)
Barangay 54	2nd	Grace Park West (7th Avenue)
Barangay 55	2nd	Grace Park West (6th Avenue)
Barangay 56	2nd	Grace Park West (8th Avenue)
Barangay 57	2nd	Grace Park West (8th Avenue)
Barangay 58	2nd	Grace Park West (8th Avenue)
Zone 6
Barangay 59	2nd	Grace Park West (8th Avenue)
Barangay 60	2nd	Grace Park West (8th Avenue)
Barangay 61	2nd	Grace Park West (8th Avenue)
Barangay 62	2nd	Grace Park West (10th Avenue)
Barangay 63	2nd	Grace Park West (10th Avenue)
Barangay 64	2nd	Grace Park West (10th Avenue)
Barangay 65	2nd	Grace Park West (10th Avenue)
Barangay 66	2nd	Grace Park West (10th Avenue)
Barangay 67	2nd	Grace Park West (10th Avenue)
Barangay 68	2nd	Grace Park West (10th Avenue)
Barangay 69	2nd	Grace Park West
Barangay 70	2nd	Grace Park West
Zone 7
Barangay 71	2nd	Grace Park West
Barangay 72	2nd	Grace Park West (Victory Compound)
Barangay 73	2nd	Grace Park West (PNR Compound)
Barangay 74	2nd	Grace Park West (Heroes Del 96)
Barangay 75	2nd	Grace Park West (Heroes Del 96)
Barangay 76	2nd	Grace Park West (Monumento)
Barangay 77	1st	University Hills (Samson Road)
Barangay 78	1st	University Hills (Monumento)
Barangay 79	1st	University Hills (Caimito Road)
Barangay 80	1st	University Hills (UE Caloocan)
Zone 8
Barangay 81	1st	Morning Breeze Subdivision
Barangay 82	1st	Morning Breeze Subdivision
Barangay 83	1st	Morning Breeze Subdivision
Barangay 84	1st	Morning Breeze Subdivision (MCU)
Barangay 85	1st	Morning Breeze Subdivision
Barangay 86	2nd	Grace Park East (EDSA)
Barangay 87	2nd	Grace Park East (EDSA)
Barangay 88	2nd	Grace Park East (11th Avenue)
Barangay 89	2nd	Grace Park East (11th Avenue)
Barangay 90	2nd	Grace Park East (11th Avenue)
Barangay 91	2nd	Grace Park East (11th Avenue)
Barangay 92	2nd	Grace Park East, Madre Ignacia
Barangay 93	2nd	Grace Park East
Zone 9
Barangay 94	2nd	Grace Park East (Biglang-Awa)
Barangay 95	2nd	Balintawak
Barangay 96	2nd	Grace Park East (EDSA)
Barangay 97	2nd	Grace Park East (11th Avenue)
Barangay 98	2nd	Grace Park East (11th Avenue)
Barangay 99	2nd	Balintawak (Dorotea Compound)
Barangay 100	2nd	Grace Park East (11th Avenue)
Barangay 101	2nd	Grace Park East (Barrio Galino)
Barangay 102	2nd	Grace Park East (9th Avenue)
Barangay 103	2nd	Grace Park East (8th Avenue)
Barangay 104	2nd	Grace Park East (8th Avenue)
Barangay 105	2nd	Grace Park East (8th Avenue)
Zone 10
Barangay 106	2nd	Grace Park East (10th Avenue)
Barangay 107	2nd	Grace Park East (10th Avenue)
Barangay 108	2nd	Grace Park East (10th Avenue)
Barangay 109	2nd	Grace Park East (8th Avenue)
Barangay 110	2nd	Grace Park East (7th Avenue)
Barangay 111	2nd	Grace Park East (7th Avenue)
Barangay 112	2nd	Grace Park East (7th Avenue)
Barangay 113	2nd	Grace Park East (6th Avenue)
Barangay 114	2nd	Grace Park East (6th Avenue)
Barangay 115	2nd	Grace Park East (6th Avenue)
Barangay 116	2nd	Grace Park East (6th Avenue)
Barangay 117	2nd	Grace Park East (5th Avenue)
Barangay 118	2nd	Grace Park East (La Loma Cemetery)
Barangay 119	2nd	Grace Park East (4th Avenue)
Barangay 120	2nd	Grace Park East (2nd Avenue)
Zone 11
Barangay 121	2nd	Grace Park East (7th Avenue)
Barangay 122	2nd	Grace Park East (7th Avenue)
Barangay 123	2nd	Grace Park East (5th Avenue)
Barangay 124	2nd	Grace Park East (5th Avenue)
Barangay 125	2nd	Grace Park East (5th Avenue)
Barangay 126	2nd	Barrio San Jose
Barangay 127	2nd	Barrio San Jose
Barangay 128	2nd	Barrio San Jose
Barangay 129	2nd	Barrio San Jose
Barangay 130	2nd	Barrio San Jose
Barangay 131	2nd	Barrio San Jose
Zone 12
Barangay 132	1st	Bagong Barrio West
Barangay 133	1st	Bagong Barrio West
Barangay 134	1st	Bagong Barrio West
Barangay 135	1st	Bagong Barrio West
Barangay 136	1st	Bagong Barrio West
Barangay 137	1st	Bagong Barrio West
Barangay 138	1st	Bagong Barrio West
Barangay 139	1st	Bagong Barrio West
Barangay 140	1st	Bagong Barrio West
Barangay 141	1st	Bagong Barrio West
Zone 13
Barangay 142	1st	Bagong Barrio West
Barangay 143	1st	Bagong Barrio West
Barangay 144	1st	Bagong Barrio West
Barangay 145	1st	Bagong Barrio West
Barangay 146	1st	Bagong Barrio West
Barangay 147	1st	Bagong Barrio West
Barangay 148	1st	Bagong Barrio West
Barangay 149	1st	Bagong Barrio West
Barangay 150	1st	Bagong Barrio West
Barangay 151	1st	Bagong Barrio West
Barangay 152	1st	Bagong Barrio West
Barangay 153	1st	Bagong Barrio West
Barangay 154	1st	Bagong Barrio West
Barangay 155	1st	Bagong Barrio West
Zone 14
Barangay 156	1st	Bagong Barrio East
Barangay 157	1st	Bagong Barrio East
Barangay 158	1st	Libis Baesa (Eternal Gardens Memorial Park)
Barangay 159	1st	Libis Baesa
Barangay 160	1st	Libis Baesa
Barangay 161	1st	Libis Reparo
Barangay 162	1st	Santa Quiteria
Barangay 163	1st	Santa Quiteria
Barangay 164	1st	Talipapa

Caloocan (North)
Barangay	District	Area/Name
Zone 15
Barangay 165	1st	Bagbaguin
Barangay 166	1st	Kaybiga
Barangay 167	1st	Llano
Barangay 168	1st	Deparo
Barangay 169	1st	BF Homes Caloocan
Barangay 170	1st	Deparo 2
Barangay 171	1st	Bagumbong
Barangay 172	1st	Urduja Village
Barangay 173	1st	Congress
Barangay 174	1st	Camarin (Central)
Barangay 175	1st	Camarin
Barangay 176-A	1st	Bagong Silang
Barangay 176-B	1st	Bagong Silang
Barangay 176-C	1st	Bagong Silang
Barangay 176-D	1st	Bagong Silang
Barangay 176-E	1st	Bagong Silang
Barangay 176-F	1st	Bagong Silang
Barangay 177	1st	Camarin (Cielito)
Zone 16
Barangay 178	3rd	Camarin (Kiko)
Barangay 179	3rd	Amparo
Barangay 180	3rd	Tala
Barangay 181	3rd	Pangarap Village, Tala
Barangay 182	3rd	Pangarap Village, Tala
Barangay 183	3rd	Tala
Barangay 184	3rd	Tala
Barangay 185	3rd	Tala
Barangay 186	3rd	Tala
Barangay 187	3rd	Tala
Barangay 188	3rd	Tala

=== Territorial disputes ===
Caloocan has three unresolved boundary disputes.

Its dispute with San Jose del Monte, Bulacan, docketed as G.R. No. 142601 dated October 23, 2006, encompasses portions of Pangarap Village and apparently Bankers Village 2 that are once part of Tala Estate. The lack of jurisdiction of the Commission on Settlement of Land Problems (COSLAP) resulted to the nullification of its decision.

Its dispute with Quezon City revolves around the latter's Barangay Baesa. There are also boundary discrepancies along Andres Bonifacio Avenue near Manila North Cemetery and Caloocan's Barrio San Jose.

Its dispute with Malabon involves Caloocan’s Barangays 160 and 161 in Libis Baesa, which both cities claim as within their jurisdiction. In 2025, the Supreme Court of the Philippines dismissed Caloocan’s petition questioning the constitutionality of Republic Act No. 9019 (Malabon City Charter), citing it as premature. Caloocan had argued that both barangays were included in its territory as part of Republic Act No. 3278 (Caloocan City Charter) and claimed that both barangays' residents had consistently voted in Caloocan's elections since 1961. The Court instead directed both cities to resolve the issue through procedures under the Local Government Code, starting with their respective city councils. Prior to this, in 2014, the city governments of Caloocan and Malabon signed a memorandum of understanding (MOU) to develop 80 hectares (200 acres) of disputed land located within Caloocan's Libis Baesa area and Malabon's Barangay Potrero. The MOU preempted any court decisions on the dispute that began in 2001, when Malabon, upon its conversion to a highly urbanized city, took control over lands formerly under Caloocan's jurisdiction.

== Demographics ==
Population census of Caloocan

Year	Pop.	±% p.a.
1903	7,847	—
1918	19,551	+6.27%
1939	38,820	+3.32%
1948	58,208	+4.60%
1960	145,523	+7.93%
1970	274,453	+6.54%
1975	397,201	+7.70%
1980	467,816	+3.33%

Year	Pop.	±% p.a.
1990	763,415	+5.02%
1995	1,023,159	+5.64%
2000	1,177,604	+3.06%
2007	1,381,610	+2.23%
2010	1,489,040	+2.76%
2015	1,583,978	+1.18%
2020	1,661,584	+1.01%
2024	1,712,945	+0.73%

Source: Philippine Statistics Authority

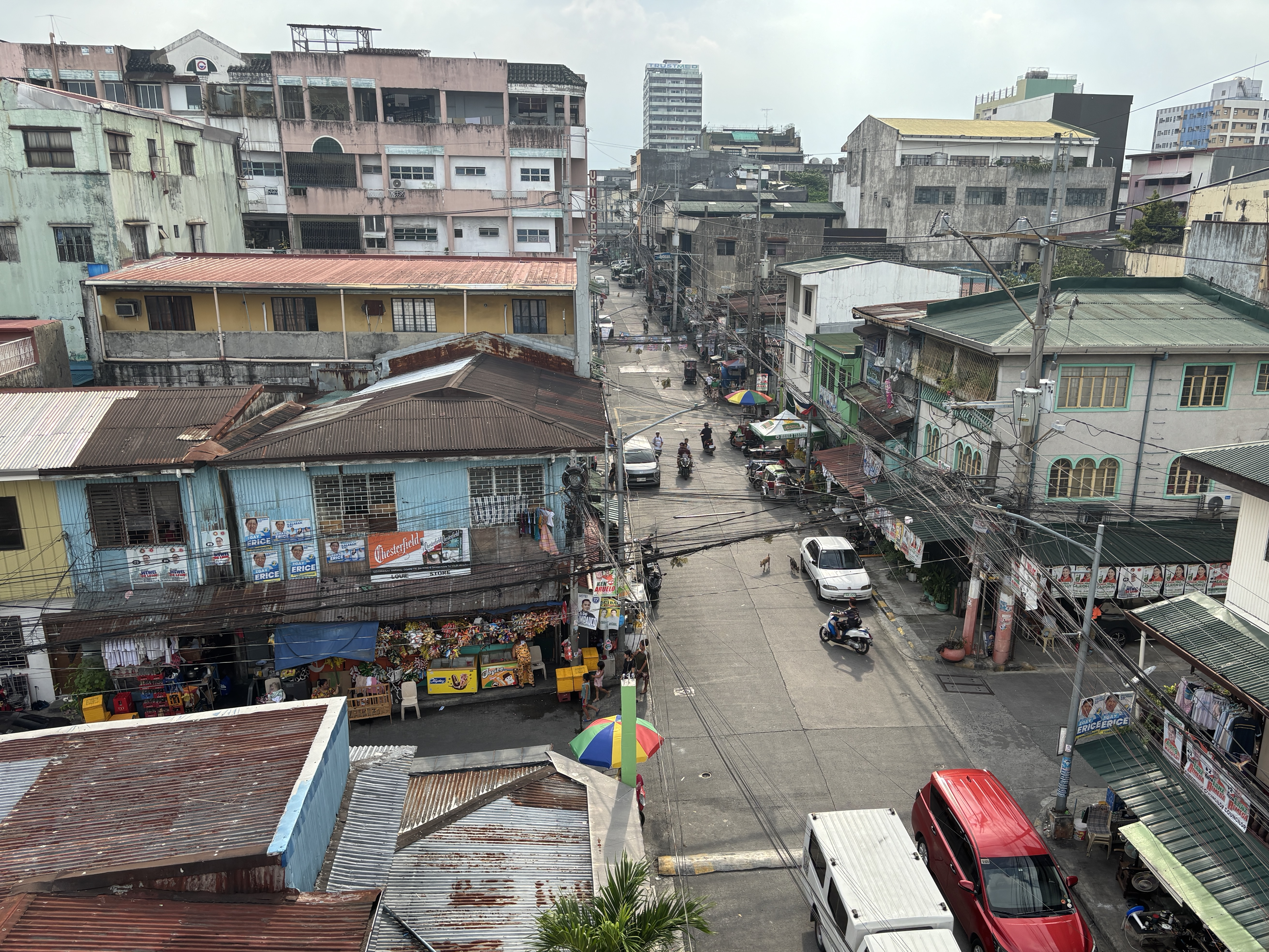
View of the residential area in Grace Park East

As of 2024, the city has a population of 1,712,945 people, which makes it the fourth largest city in the Philippines in terms of population. Under the same census year, Caloocan South (Barangays 1 to 164) was recorded as having a population of 602,818, and Caloocan North (Barangays 165 to 188) was recorded with a population of 1,110,127. If the two districts were treated as separate cities, they still would have been among the largest in the country as of the 2024 census year, ranking 5th and 17th respectively in terms of population.

The population density of Caloocan (30,000 inhabitants per square kilometer or 78,000 inhabitants per square mile) surpasses that of the National Capital Region as a whole.

The 1st district of Caloocan was once the country's most populous legislative district, with 1.19 million persons as of 2015, prior to the creation of the 3rd district that was excised from it.

=== Language ===
Most residents speak Filipino (Tagalog) and English, with considerable numbers speaking other languages and dialects of the Philippines.

=== Religion ===
Like many other places in the country, Caloocan is predominantly Roman Catholic. It is home to the seat of the Roman Catholic Diocese of Kalookan in its southern part, while its northern part is under the Roman Catholic Diocese of Novaliches. There is also a significant presence of Iglesia ni Cristo and other Protestant churches in the city.

== Economy ==
Poverty incidence of Caloocan (%)

Source: Philippine Statistics Authority

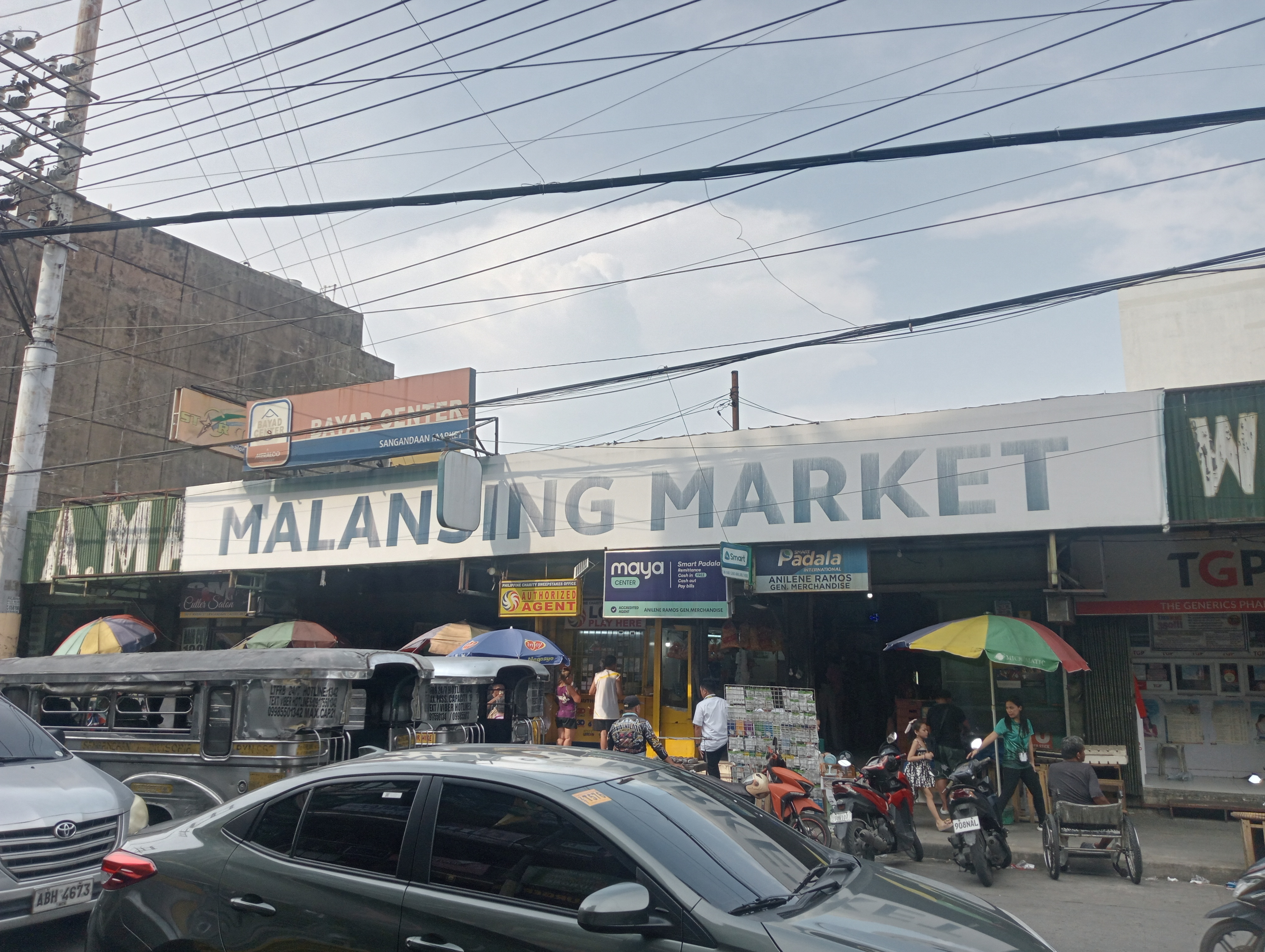
Malansing Market in Sangandaan

According to the Department of Trade and Industry's Cities & Municipalities Competitive Index, Caloocan has an economic dynamism of 20% as of 2024, ranking 15th among local government units (LGUs) in the Philippines.

Caloocan's 10th Avenue area is well known for its clusters of motorcycle dealers and motorcycle spare parts dealers. Among the major and famous streets are P. Zamora Street and A. Mabini Street.

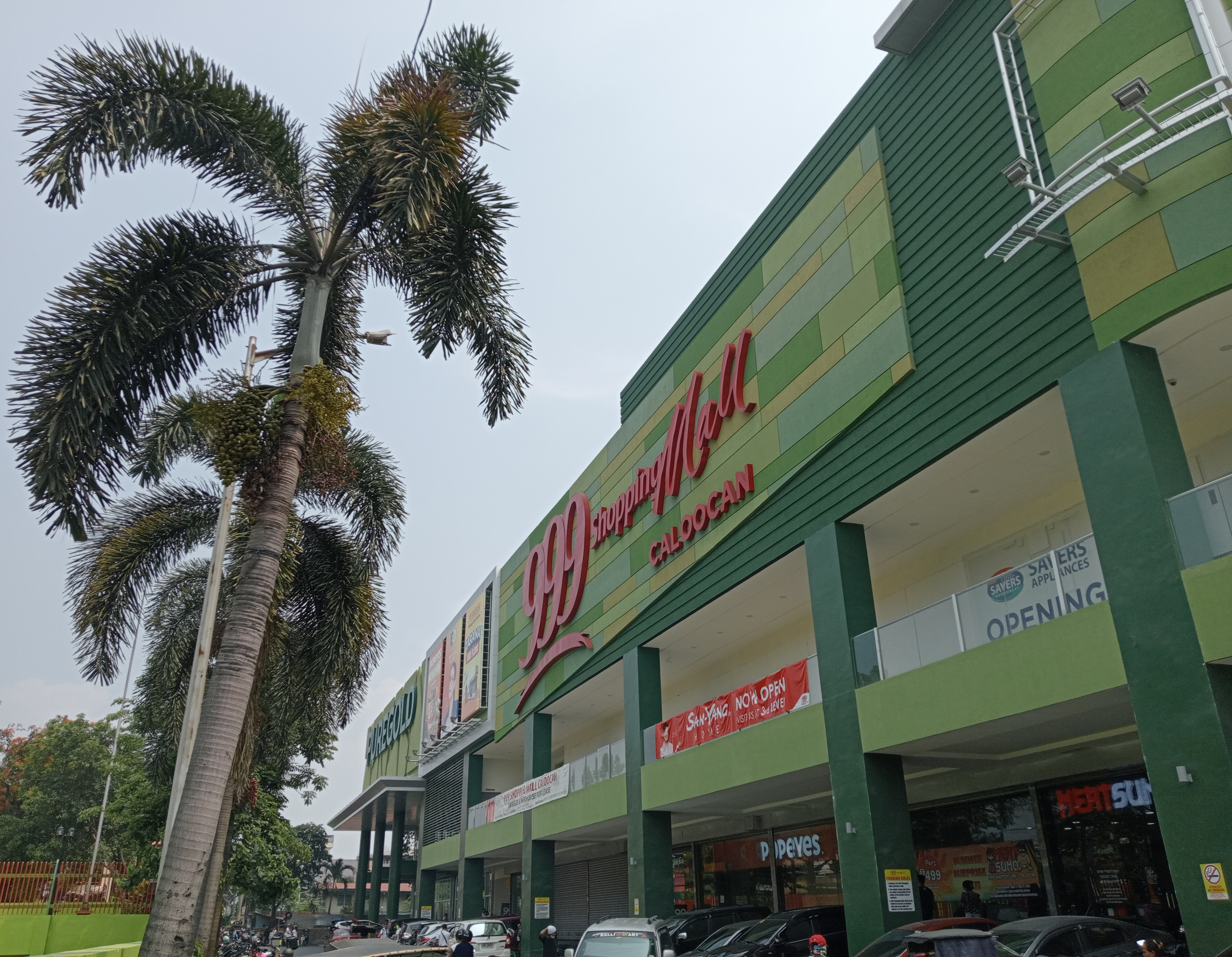
999 Shopping Mall Caloocan

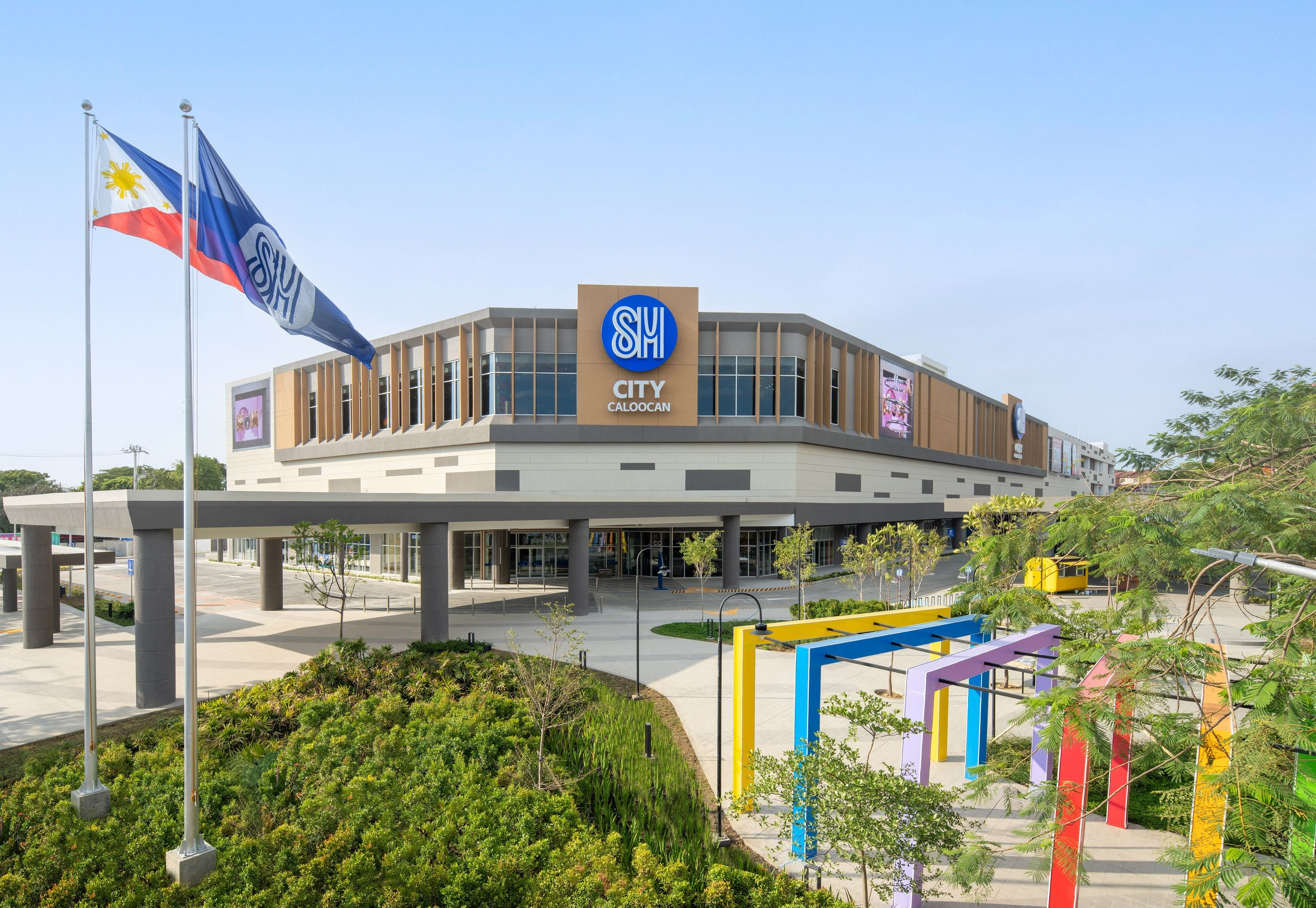
SM City Caloocan

The city also has a number of shopping malls and stand-alone supermarkets and hypermarkets. In the southern part are SM City Grand Central (on the former site of Ever Gotesco Grand Central), Puregold Monumento, Puregold Maypajo, Victory Central Mall, Araneta Square, Uniwide Warehouse Club Monumento, LRT Caloocan Mall, SM Hypermarket Monumento, SM Center Sangandaan, 999 Shopping Mall Caloocan, and Walter Mart Caloocan. On the other hand, in the northern part are Zabarte Town Center, Holiday Island Mall, Metroplaza Mall, Primark Town Center Deparo, Primark Town Center Brixton, and SM City Caloocan.

Factories and industrial areas have also been built in various parts of Caloocan. Manufacturers are concentrated in the northern part, particularly in Bagumbong, Kaybiga, Llano, and Tala, while plastic and steel industries are concentrated in the southern part. Tala hosts the Victoria Wave Special Economic Zone, a 25-hectare (62-acre) registered zone under the Philippine Economic Zone Authority.

NLEX Corporation, the concession holder of the North Luzon Expressway, is headquartered in Caloocan. The expressway's main section, NLEX Harbor Link, and NLEX Connector traverse through South Caloocan. Planned expressways such as the North Luzon East Expressway and North Access Link Expressway are slated to traverse Caloocan.

== Government ==
Caloocan City Hall in Grace Park

Caloocan City Hall North in Camarin, prior to its 2023 upgrade

The city halls of Caloocan

=== Local government ===
Caloocan, like other cities of the Philippines, is a local government unit whose powers and functions are specified by the Local Government Code of the Philippines. In general, as a city, Caloocan is headed by a mayor who heads the city's executive function and the vice mayor who heads the city's legislative function, which is composed of eighteen councilors, six from each of the city's three city council districts. For representation, the city has three districts, and therefore three representatives, in the country's House of Representatives.

The current Caloocan City Hall, situated in Grace Park East, serves as the city's seat of government. Located in a rectangular lot between 8th and 9th Streets and 8th and 9th Avenues, it replaced the old city hall built in 1952 on A. Mabini Street, across from San Roque Cathedral-Parish, now occupied by 999 Shopping Mall Caloocan. The Caloocan City Hall North, situated in Camarin along Zapote Street, serves the northern part of the city. It is currently undergoing reconstruction since 2023.

=== Elected officials ===
City officials of Caloocan (2025–2028)
Designation	First district	Second district	Third District
Representatives	Oscar G. Malapitan (Nacionalista)	Edgar R. Erice (Liberal)	Dean Asistio (Lakas)
Mayor	Dale Gonzalo R. Malapitan (Nacionalista)		
Vice Mayor	Anna Karina R. Teh-Limsico (Nacionalista)		
Councilors	Ray Christopher C. Adalem (Nacionalista)	Jose Lorenzo T. Almeda (NUP)	Merwyn Lennon D.C. Abel (Nacionalista)
Councilors	Leah M. Bacolod (Nacionalista)	James Kenneth A. Aruelo (PDP)	Theresita M. Ceralde (Nacionalista)
Councilors	Alexander M. Caralde (Nacionalista)	Constalene Carmen N. Asistio (Lakas)	Carliza May A. Del Rosario (Nacionalista)
Councilors	Orvince Howard A. Hernandez (Nacionalista)	Carolyn C. Cunanan (Nacionalista)	Kingjohn Ericson M. Echiverri (Nacionalista)
Councilors	Vincent Ryan R. Malapitan (Nacionalista)	Alexander V. Mangasar (Liberal)	Aurora A. Henson Jr. (Nacionalista)
Councilors	Jacqueline Z. Nubla (Aksyon)	Naomi Charmaine D. Quimpo (Liberal)	Patrick L. Prado (Nacionalista)
ABC President	Vergel J. De Vera (Barangay 67, Grace Park West)		
SK President	Bea C. Hedreyda (Barangay 35, Maypajo)		

== Infrastructure ==
=== Transportation ===
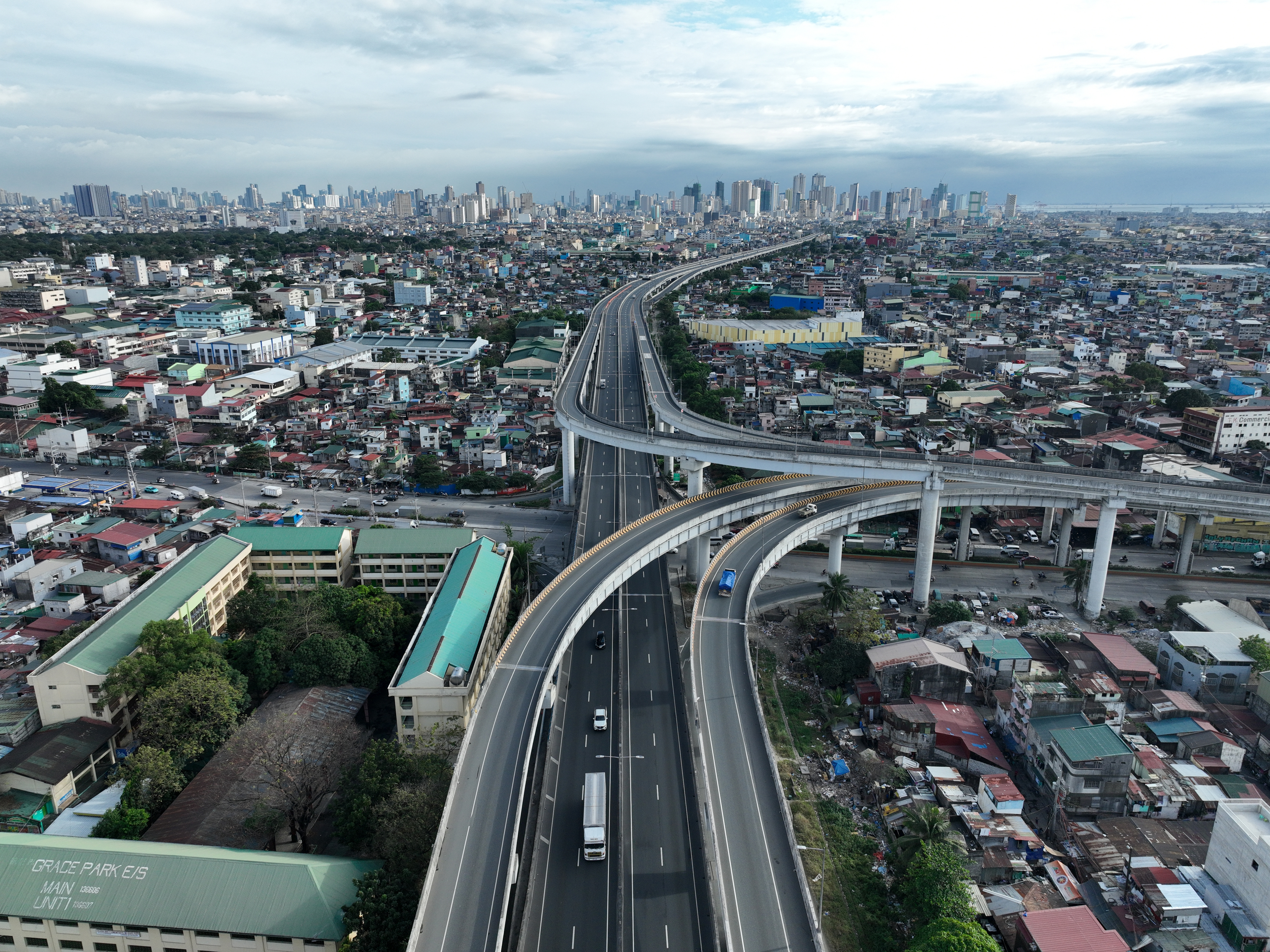
Caloocan Interchange, an intersection of the NLEX Harbor Link and NLEX Connector

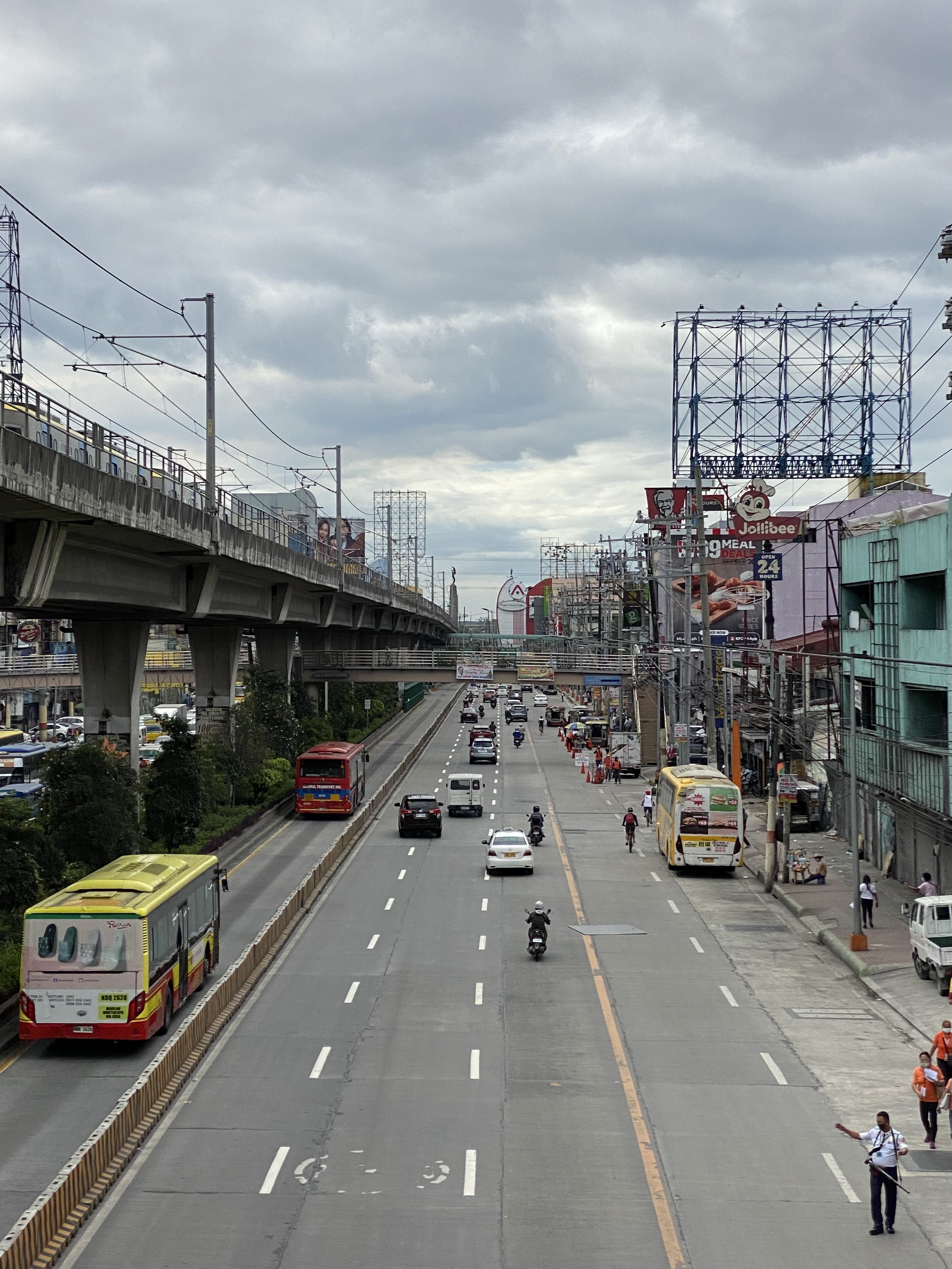
The northern terminus of EDSA in Caloocan

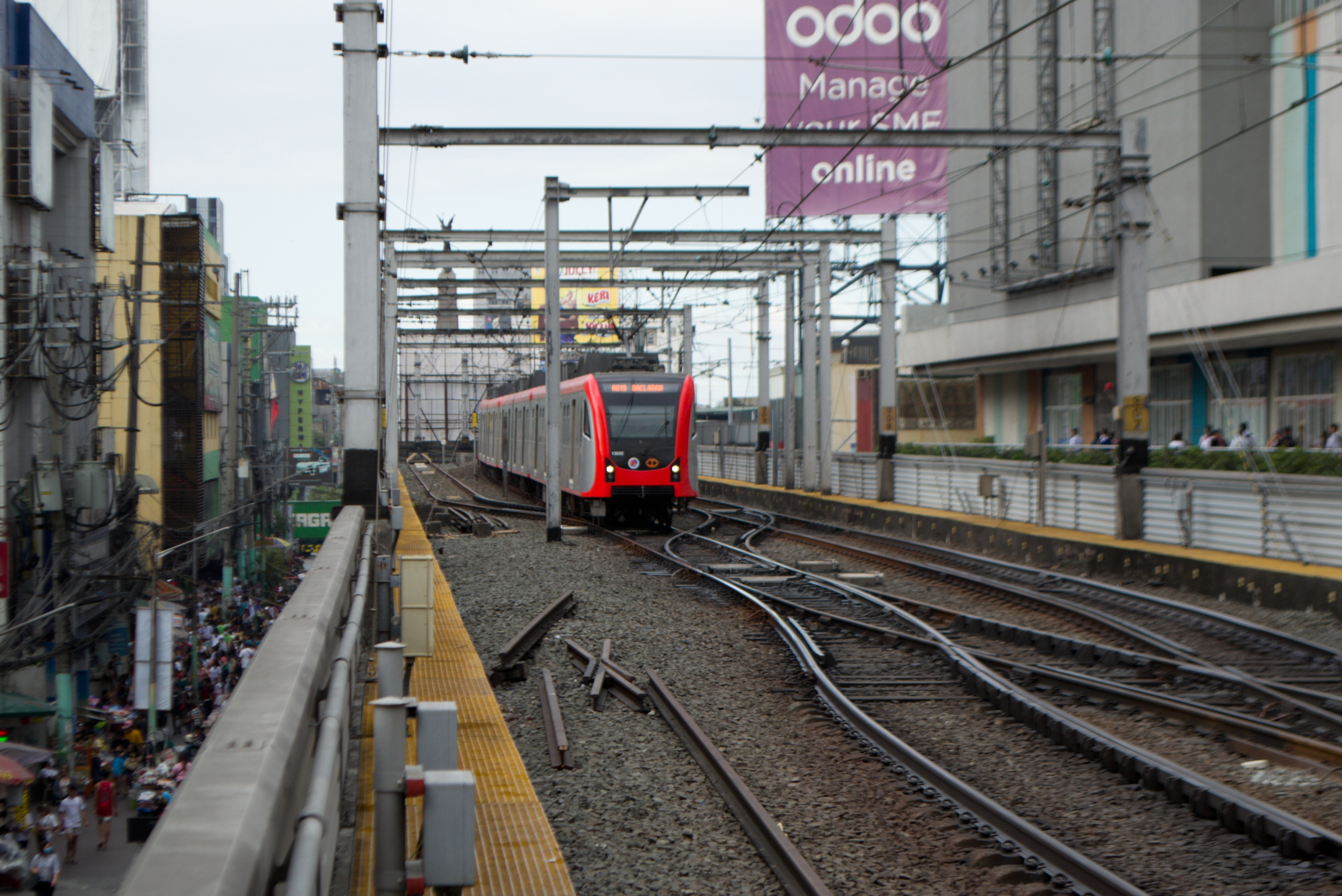
A train of the LRT Line 1 serving the Monumento area

The LRT Line 1 has two stations in the southern part of the city, namely: Monumento and 5th Avenue. Philippine National Railways (PNR) also has a line, with its terminal at Samson Road, and passes through Caloocan railway station (the first railway station built in the city), 10th Avenue railway station, and 5th Avenue railway station. The currently under construction MRT Line 7 has also two under-construction stations located at the northern part of Caloocan, namely: Sacred Heart and Tala. The North–South Commuter Railway, another currently under construction rail transit system, will replace the existing PNR Metro Commuter Line and will have one station at Caloocan. As of 2026, the right of way acquisition has yet to be finalized due to disputes with the Segment 10 of the NLEX Harbor Link, including the Caloocan depot and interfacing with the elevated road, which is going to Malabon and Valenzuela.

The city has an extensive network of roads, the most prominent being Epifanio de los Santos Avenue, which begins in the Monumento area. Quirino Highway, which connects Quezon City and eastern Bulacan, also traverses the northern part of Caloocan. The North Luzon Expressway's Operations and Maintenance Center and the motorway's Balintawak toll barrier are in the southern part of Caloocan. NLEX Harbor Link, its extension that connects it towards Navotas and Port of Manila, and the NLEX Connector project that connects Harbor Link with the City of Manila and Skyway also traverse Caloocan. The northern end of Skyway, which connects the North and South Luzon Expressways, is also found near NLEX's Balintawak toll plaza, with a possible connection to Northern Access Link Expressway, a future toll road to New Manila International Airport.

Bus line Victory Liner Incorporated has its headquarters and terminal along Rizal Avenue Extension near the Monumento station.

=== Landmarks ===
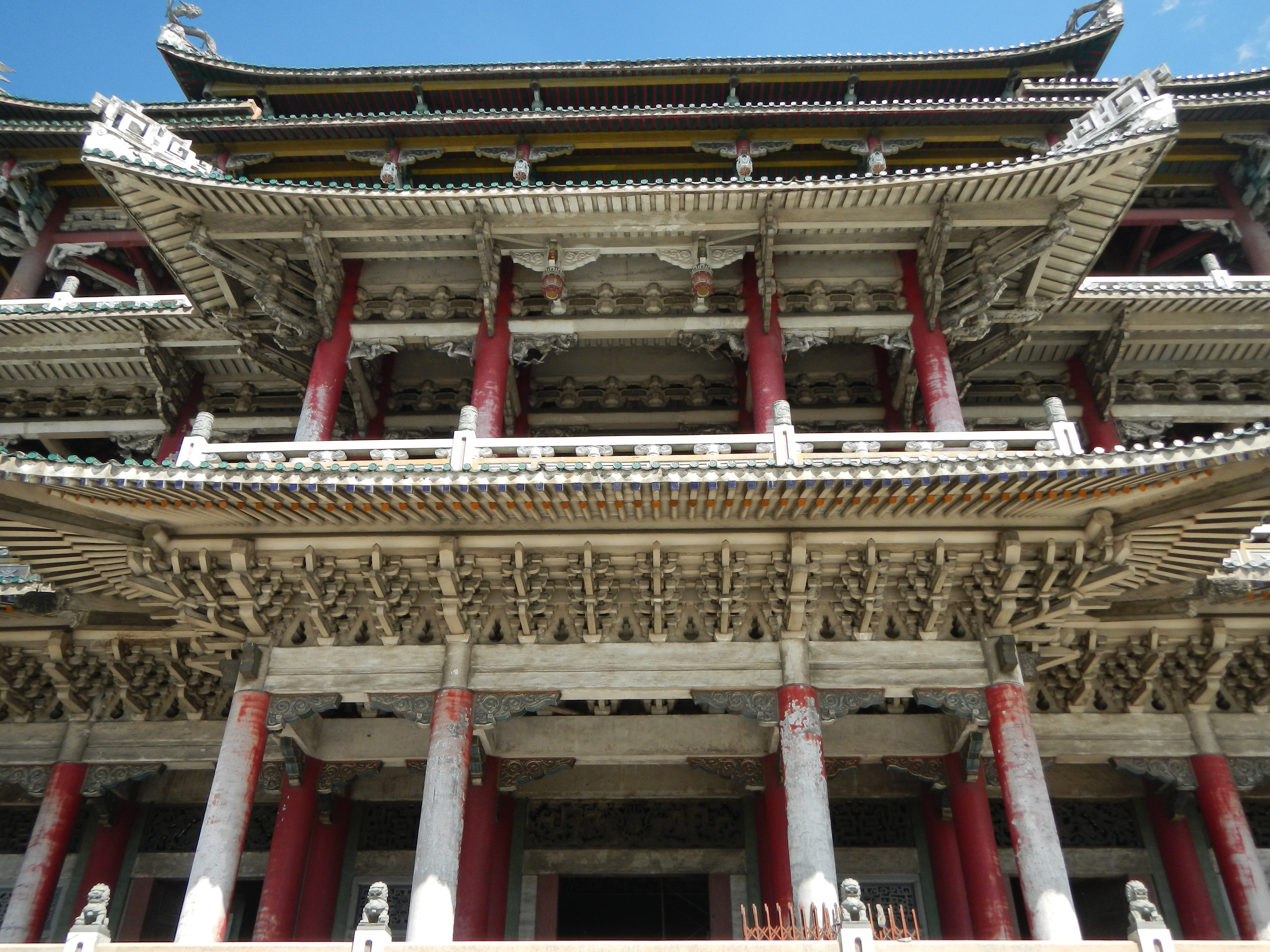
Thai To Taoist Temple

The city's most celebrated landmark is the monument to the revolutionary Andrés Bonifacio, which stands on a roundabout where EDSA, MacArthur Highway, Samson Road, and Rizal Avenue Extension intersect. The memorial was erected in 1933 and consists of an obelisk with sculptures by National Artist Guillermo Tolentino. The monument marks the very first battle of the Philippine Revolution on August 3, 1896. Recent renovations have been made on the environs of the monument, including the Bonifacio Circle, its former site, and the Caloocan stretch of EDSA, which is 100 meters (330 ft) away from the landmark. The whole area is known as 'Monumento'.

Other sites of historical importance identified by the city government include a lot in P. Zamora Street where the wife of Katipunan leader Andrés Bonifacio once resided; the heritage house of Gertrudes Sevilla, the owner of which is the nephew of Gregoria de Jesús; Santa Quiteria Church in Baesa; and Our Lady of Grace Parish in 11th Avenue; La Loma Cemetery, the oldest cemetery in Manila; and Thai To Taoist Temple along 6th Avenue. In addition, the city's District Office of the Bureau of Internal Revenue is along EDSA.

== Police ==
The Caloocan City Police Station is under the parent agency National Capital Region Police Office's Northern Police District of the Philippine National Police. They were once recognized as the best police station for their contribution to the drug war during the administration of President Rodrigo Duterte.

However, the whole Caloocan city police force was recently sacked after a series of crimes, including killings and robberies, were committed by its members. However, instead of dismissing the erring police officers, they were scheduled to be retrained by then Philippine National Police Chief Ronald dela Rosa.

In addition, the Northern Police District is headquartered in Caloocan since 1993.

== Education ==
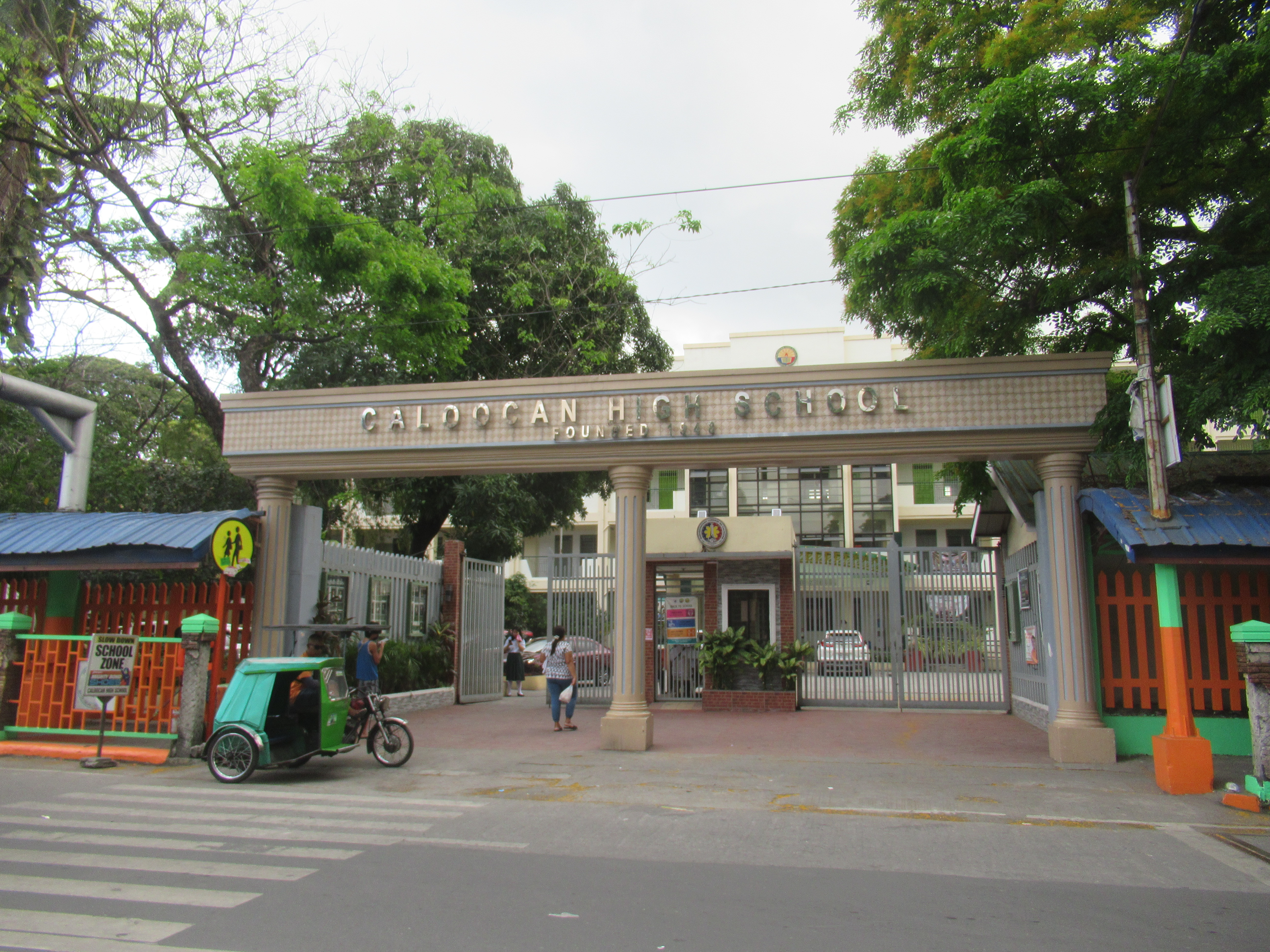
Caloocan High School

The city's lone public university is the University of Caloocan City (formerly Caloocan City Community College in 1971 and Caloocan City Polytechnic College in 1975). Other educational institutions offering tertiary education include University of the East Caloocan, Manila Central University, La Consolacion College-Caloocan, and La Consolacion College – Novaliches, Access Computer College Caloocan, AMA Computer College-Caloocan, STI Academic Center Caloocan, among others.

The Schools Division Office (SDO) - Caloocan City oversees 89 public schools and a number of private schools within the city, up to secondary level. Notable public schools are Caloocan National Science and Technology High School (North Caloocan's first-ever science and technology high school), Caloocan City Science High School, Caloocan City Business High School, and Caloocan High School. Private institutions such as the Philippine Cultural College (Annex), Saint Benedict School of Novaliches, the Diocese of Kalookan's St. Gabriel Academy, St. Mary's Academy of Caloocan City, Notre Dame of Manila, and Santa Elena School of Novaliches are also located in the city.

== Twin towns – sister cities ==
=== Local ===
- Calamba, Laguna
- Malabon, Metro Manila
- San Jose del Monte, Bulacan

=== International ===
- Incheon, South Korea

== Gallery ==
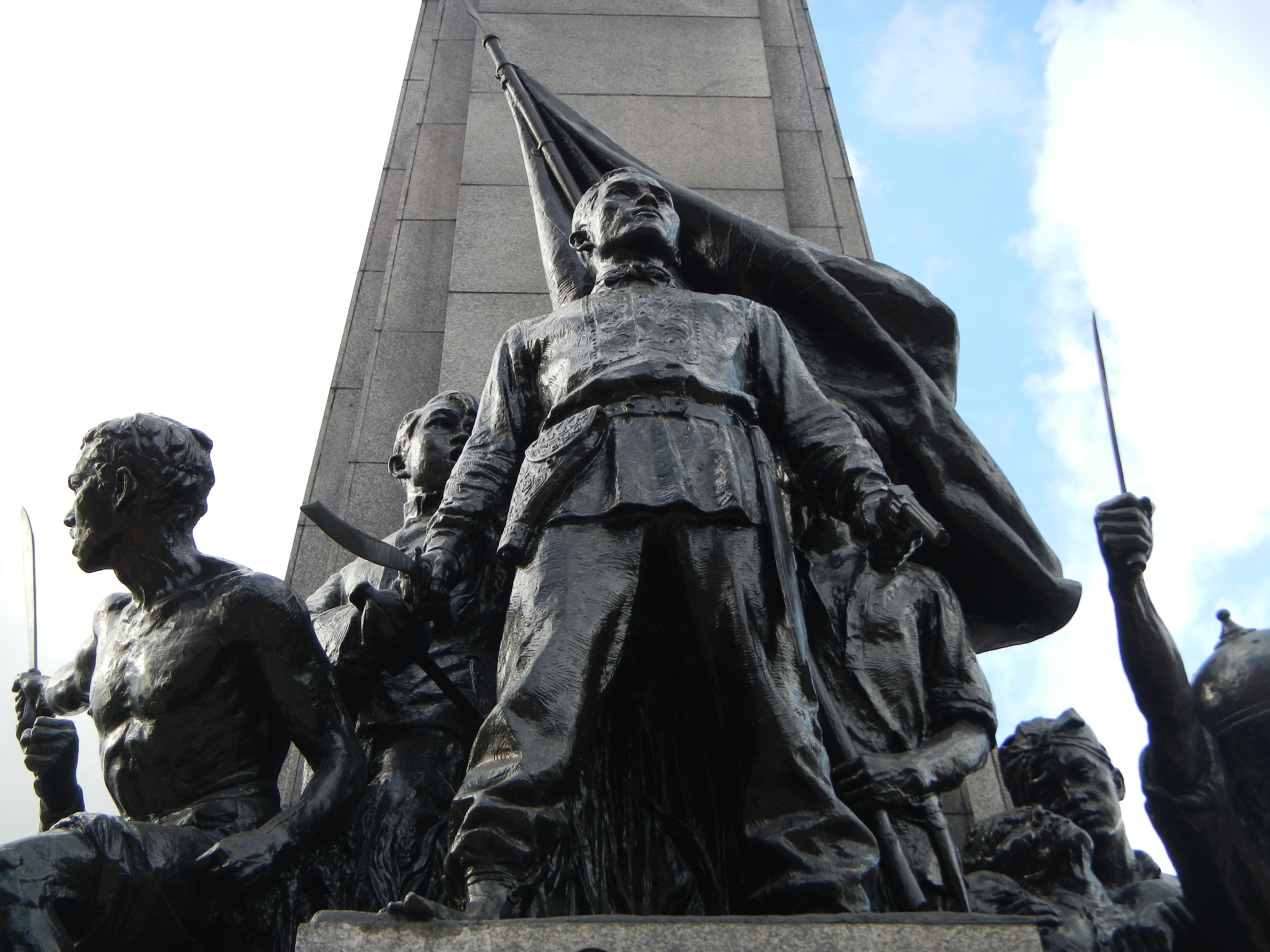
Bonifacio Monument

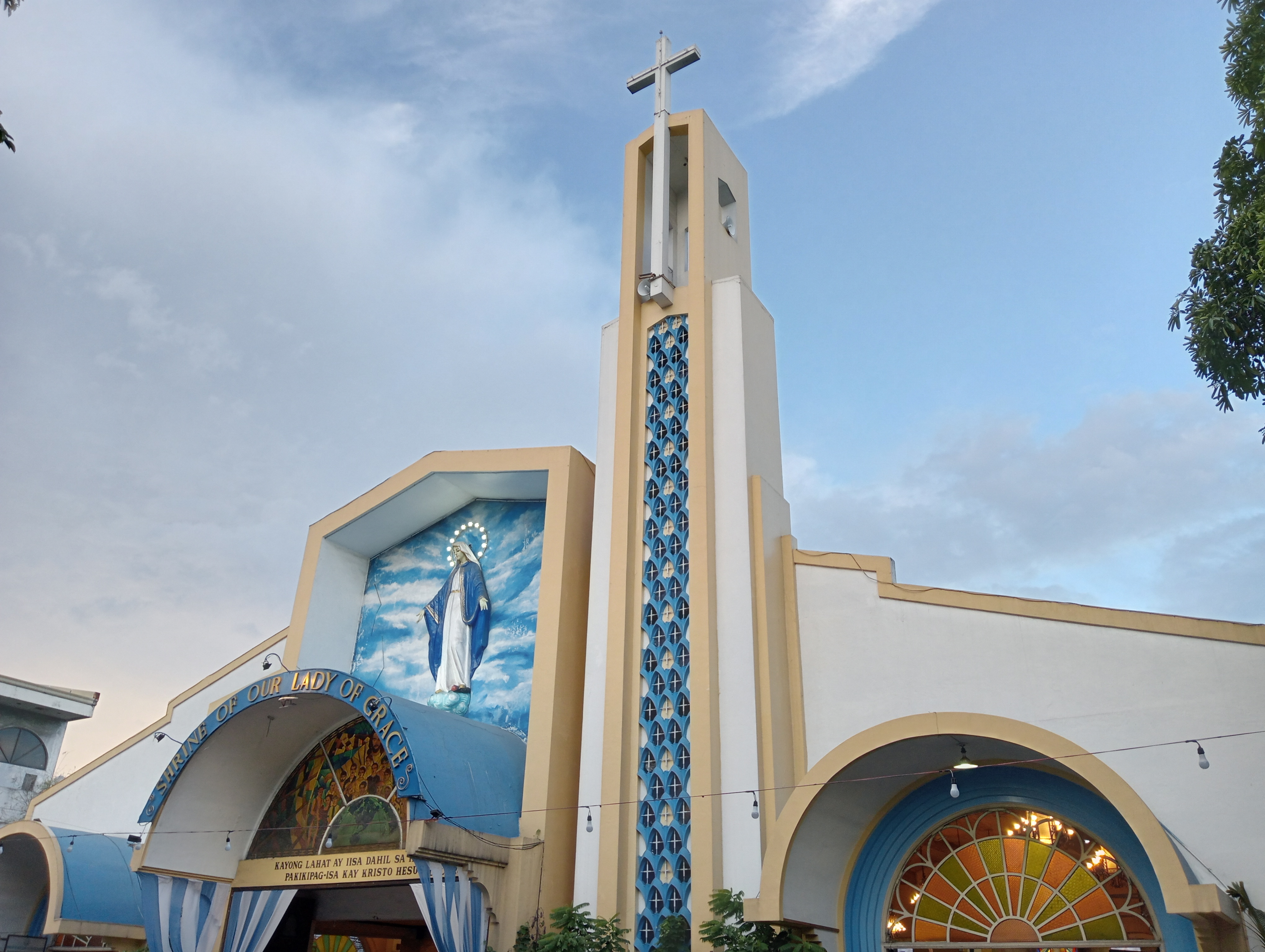
Shrine of Our Lady of Grace

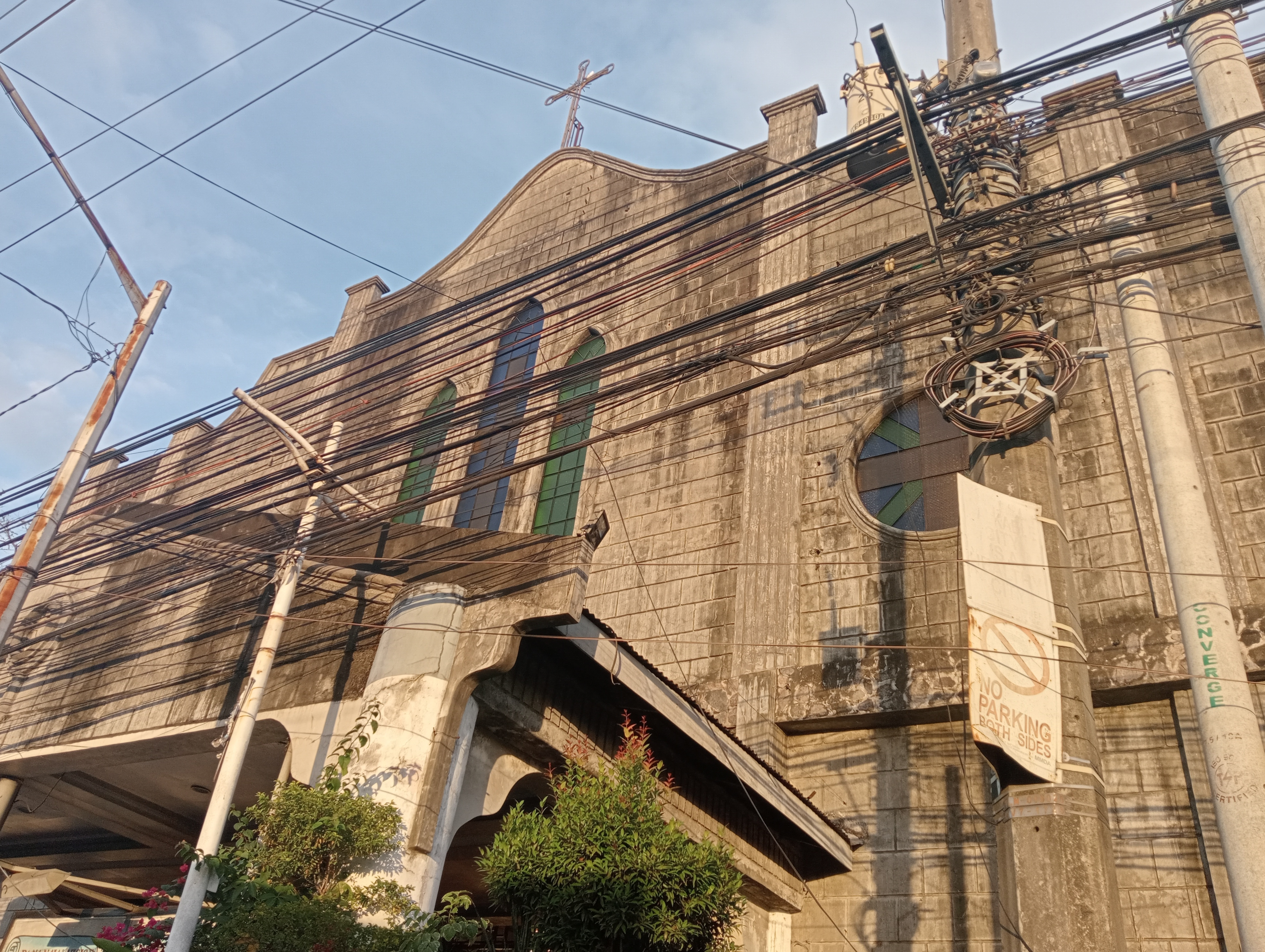
Sto. Niño de Bagong Silang Church

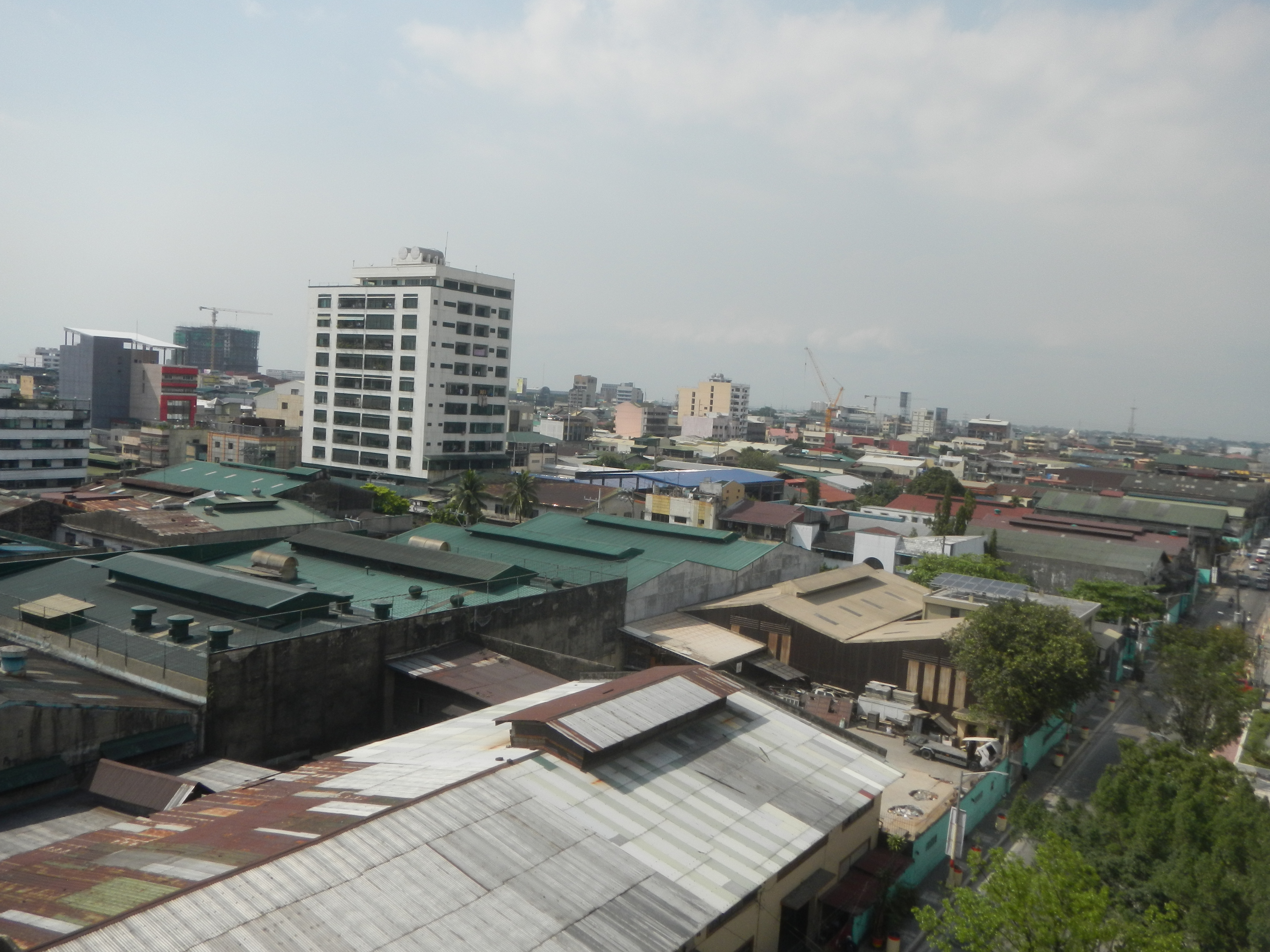
View of Grace Park from the new city hall

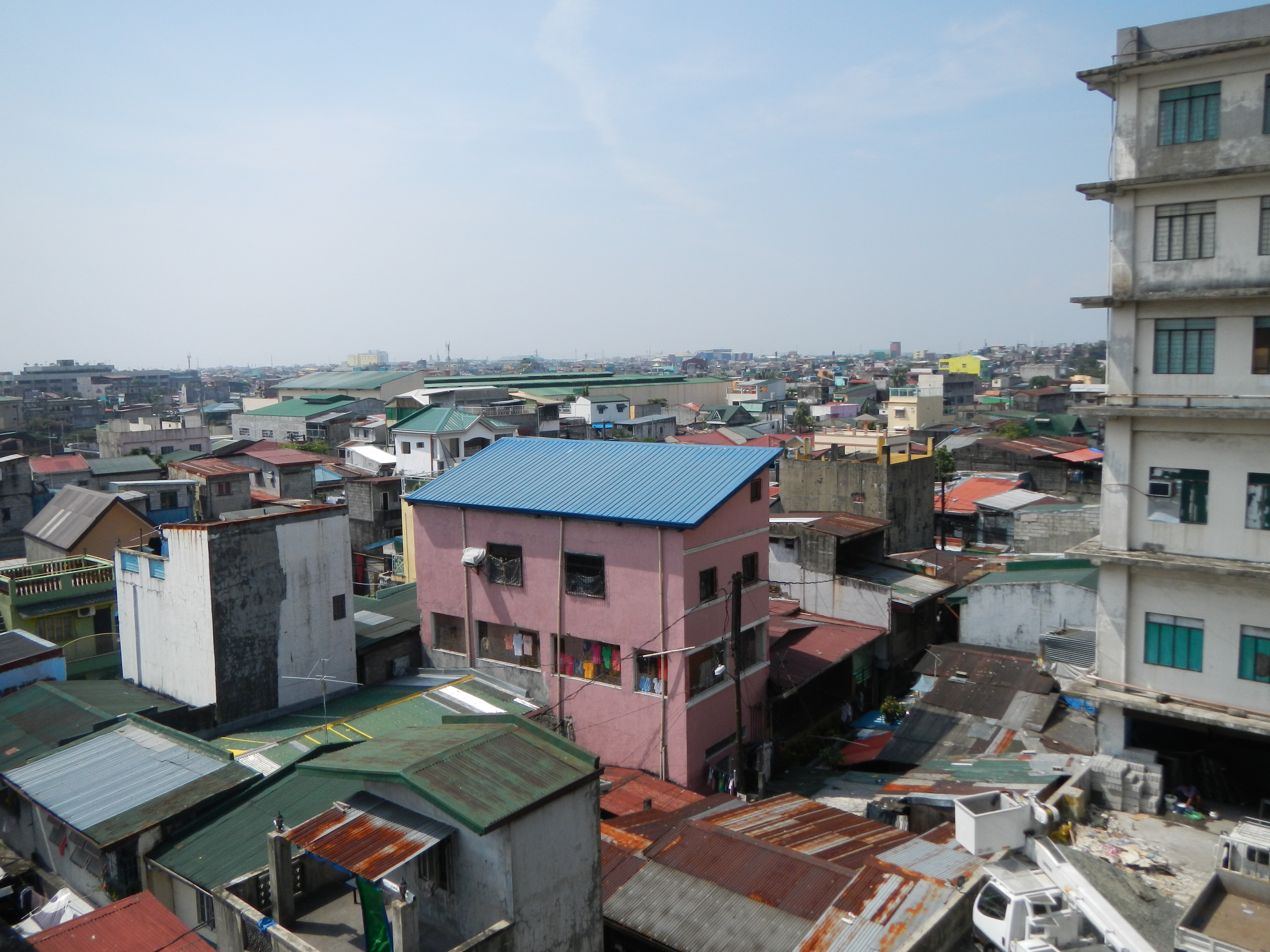
View of Barangays 15 and 16 from the old city hall

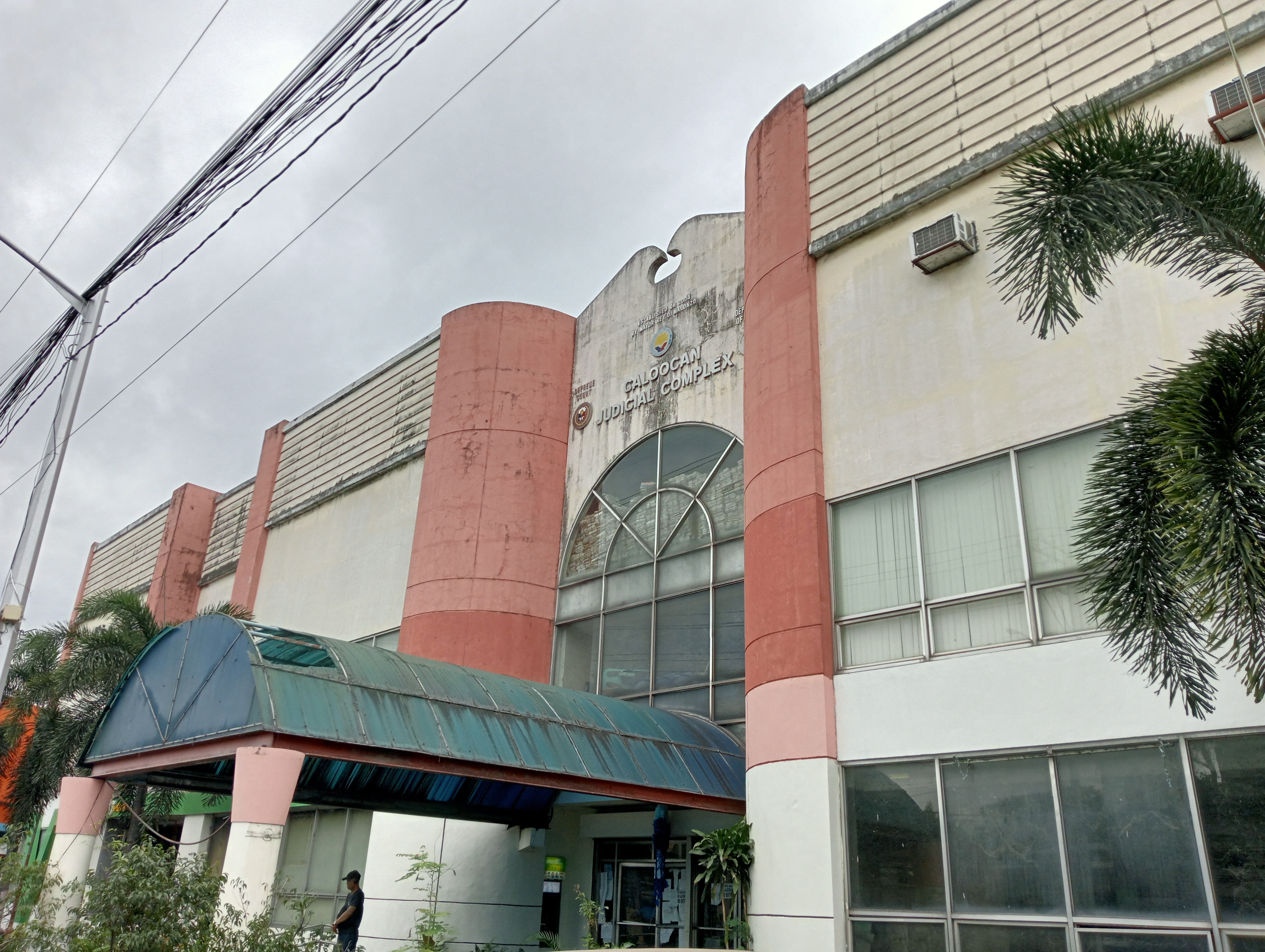
Caloocan Judicial Complex

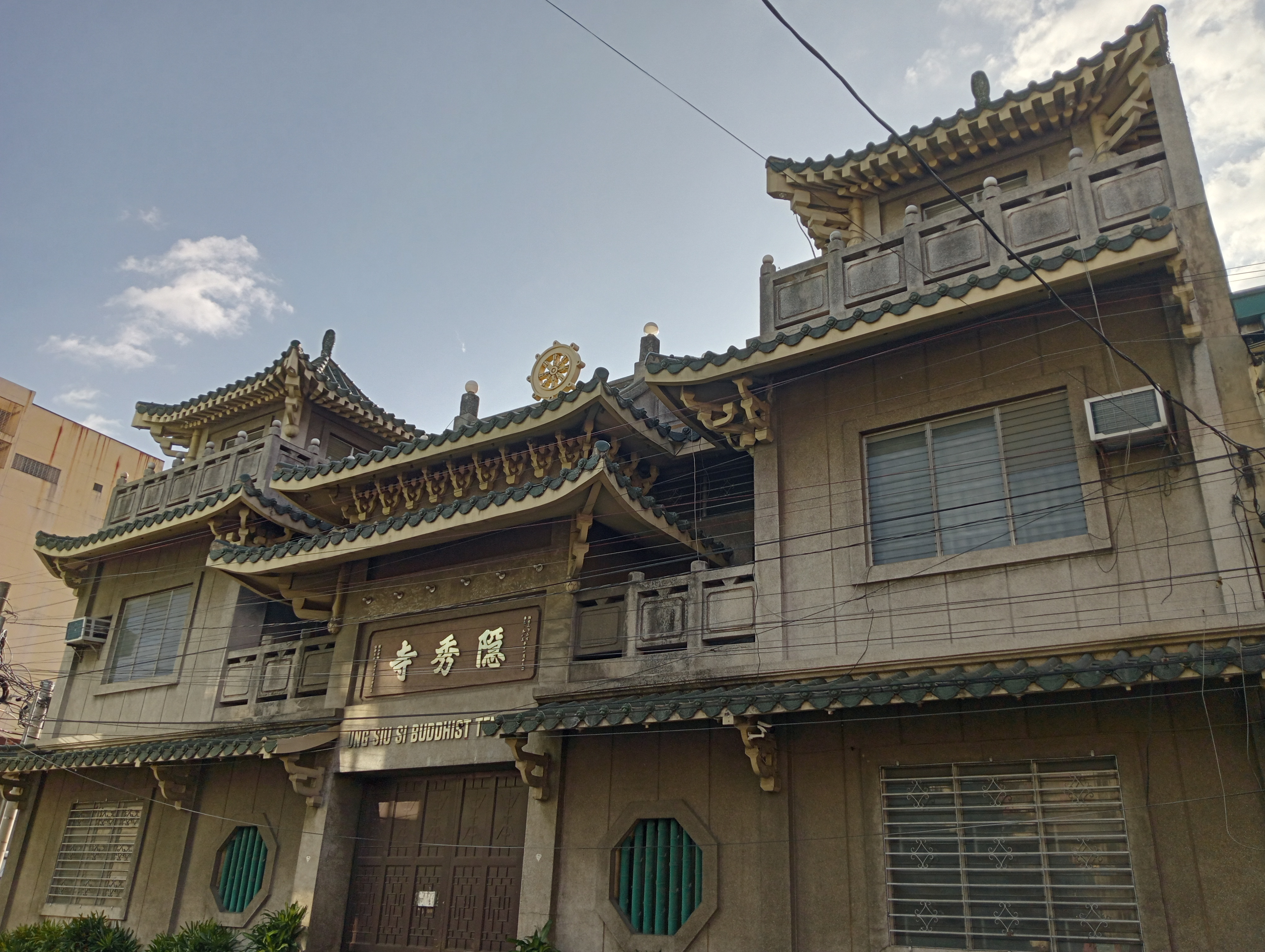
Ung Siu Si Buddhist Temple

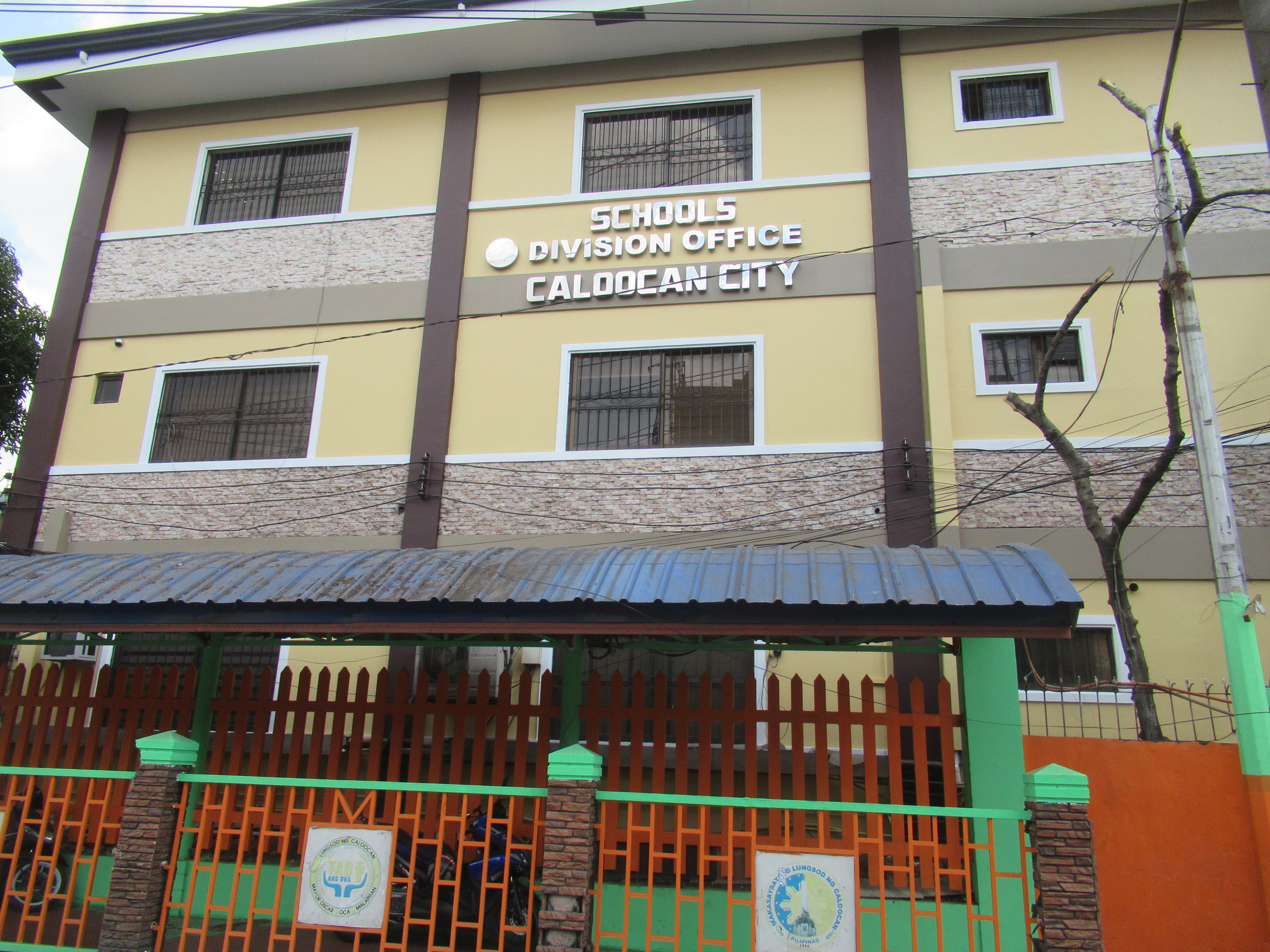
Schools Division Office of Caloocan

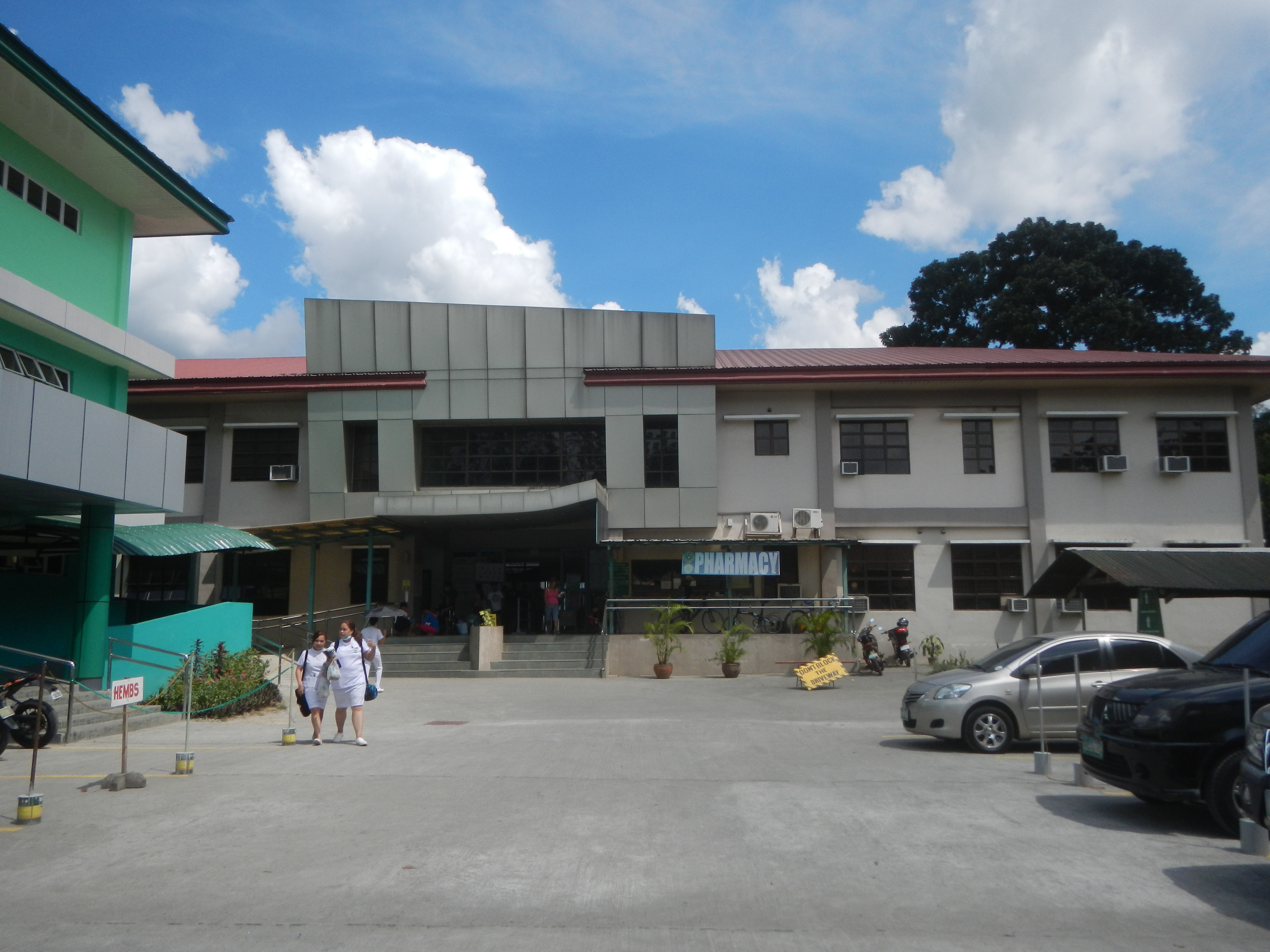
Dr. Jose N. Rodriguez Memorial Hospital in Tala

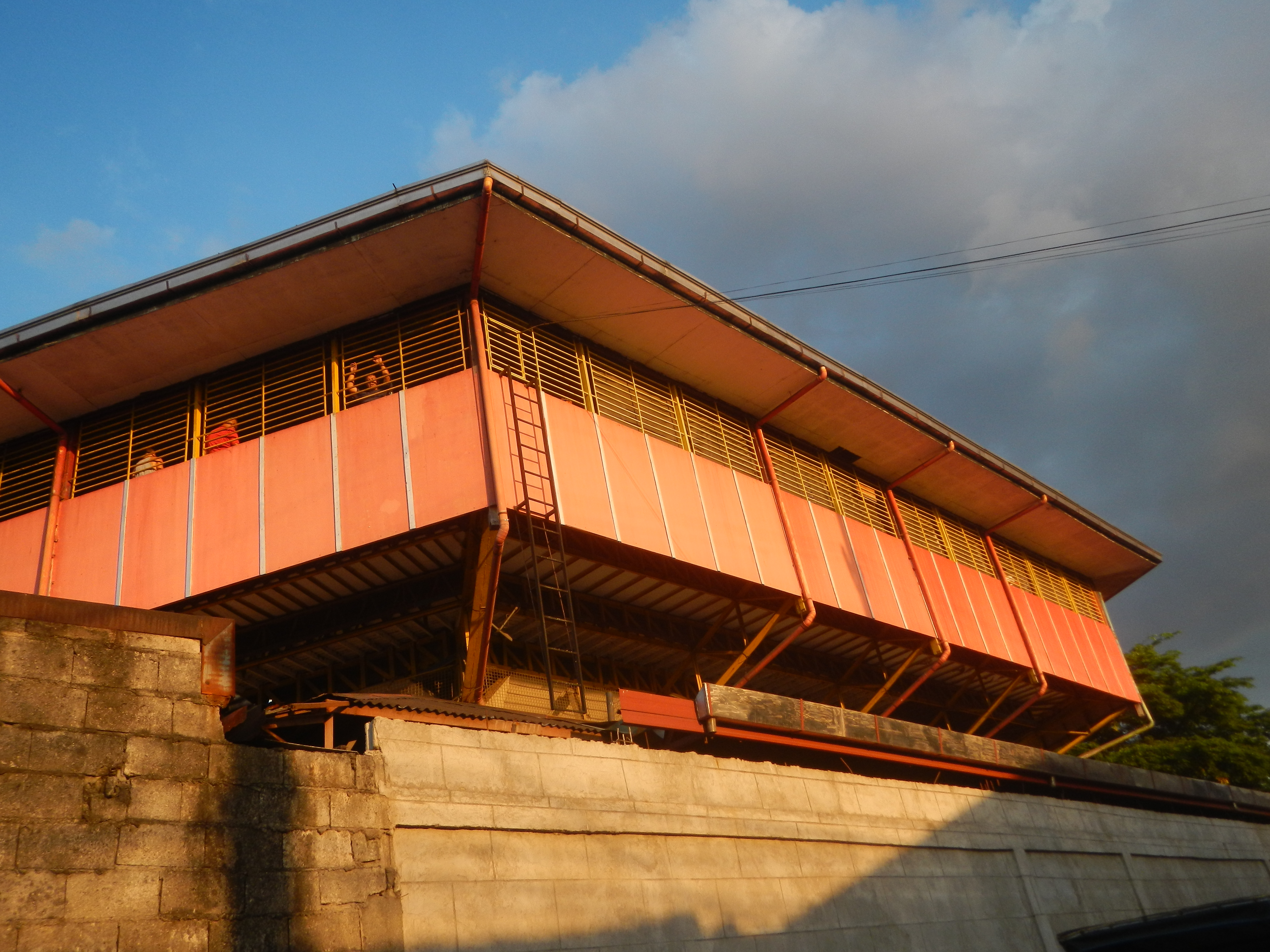
Kalookan Cockpit Arena in Kaybiga

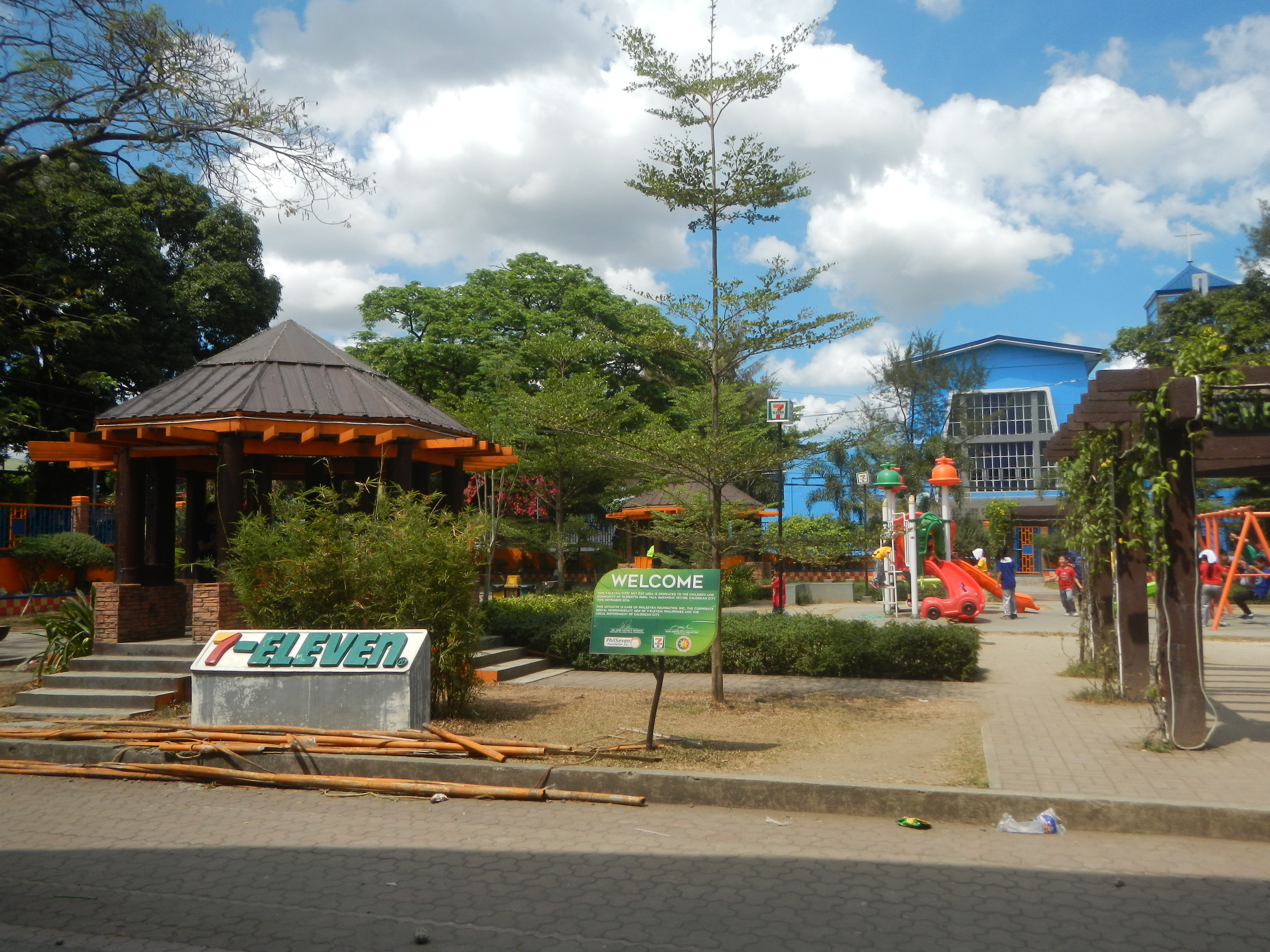
Glorieta Park

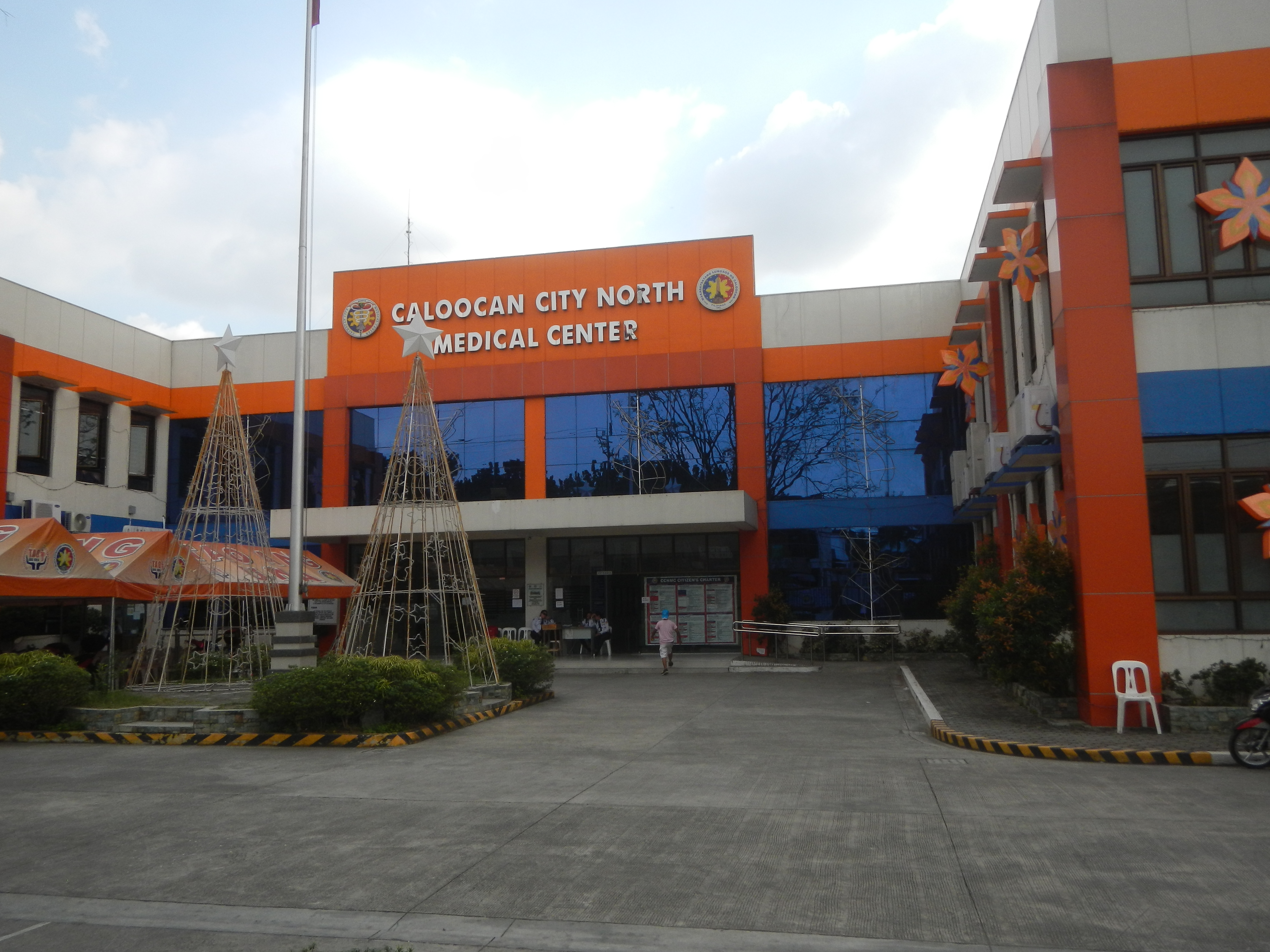
Caloocan City North Medical Center in Camarin

== Notable people ==
- Joe Dizon, Roman Catholic priest and activist
- Bo Sanchez, Roman Catholic preacher
- Benjie Paras, actor and former basketball player
- Lani Cayetano, politician
- Antonio Trillanes, former Philippine naval officer and politician
- Gregoria de Jesús, acted as secretary of the women's section and custodian of the documents and seal of the Katipunan; she married Andrés Bonifacio
- Thomas Torres, basketball player
- Melchora Aquino, revolutionary known as Tandang Sora
- Jess Lapid Jr., actor
- Maricris Garcia, singer; Pinoy Pop Superstar 3 Grand Champion
