= List of Cultural Properties of the Philippines in Malabon =

The list of Cultural Properties of the Philippines in Malabon gives relevant cultural properties in Malabon containing the site name, description, location, and images. The oldest cultural property is the San Bartolome Church built in 1614 and the latest in the list is Borja Ancestral House built in 1923.

Cultural Property wmph identifier (Note: wmph is an internal identifier used by Wikimedia Philippines to identify the monument. This is not an official identifier, and only shown temporarily in the templates until the government creates an updated complete list.)	Site name	Description	Province	City or municipality	Address	Coordinates	Image
	San Bartolome Church	church built in 1614	NCR	Malabon	Rizal Ave. Ext. San Agustin	14°39′32″N 120°57′05″E	Upload file
	St. James Academy	built in early 1900s	NCR	Malabon	Rizal Ave. Ext. San Agustin	14°39′32″N 120°57′07″E	Upload file
	Immaculate Concepcion Parish	church built in 1886	NCR	Malabon	272 Gen. Luna St.	14°37′03″N 120°58′32″E	Upload file
	La Purisima Concepcion De Malabon Church (a.k.a. Aglipayan Church/ Iglesia Filipina Independiente)	church established on November 7, 1902	NCR	Malabon	C. Arellano St.	14°40′02″N 120°56′51″E	Upload file
	San Antonio de Padua Parish Church		NCR	Malabon	Sanciangco St.	14°39′48″N 120°57′25″E	Upload file
	Sto. Rosario Church	church built in 1860	NCR	Malabon	Don Basilio Bautista Blvd. cor. M. Sioson	14°41′02″N 120°56′33″E	Upload Photo
	Tropicana Studio		NCR	Malabon	252 Gen. Luna St.	14°40′04″N 120°56′52″E	Upload Photo
	Rufina Patis Factory	built in 1900	NCR	Malabon	290 C. Arellano St.	14°40′20″N 120°56′35″E	Upload Photo
	Rivera Ancestral House	built in 1918	NCR	Malabon	M. Naval St.		Upload file
	Raymundo Ancestral House	built in 1861	NCR	Malabon	144 C. Arellano St.		Upload file
	Nepomuceno Ancestral House		NCR	Malabon	Gen. Luna St.		Upload Photo
	Gonzales Ancestral House	built in 1877	NCR	Malabon	Paez St. Ext.		Upload Photo
	Magno House		NCR	Malabon	Gen. Luna St. cor. A. Luna St.		Upload Photo
	Villongco House	built in the mid 1800s	NCR	Malabon	227 Gen. Luna St.		Upload file
	Borja Ancestral House	built in 1923	NCR	Malabon	Gen. Luna St.		Upload file
	Lazaro House		NCR	Malabon	Borja St.		Upload Photo
	Teodoro "Jose Luna" Ancestral House		NCR	Malabon	200 C. Arellano St.		Upload file
	Mario Luna Ancestral House	built in 1890	NCR	Malabon	C. Arellano St. cor Paez St.		Upload file
	Our Lady of the Most Holy Rosary Parish Church		NCR	Malabon			Upload Photo
