= Alamid =

Alamid may refer to:

- Alamid (band), a Filipino rock band
- Asian palm civet, called alamid in Tagalog
