= Deogracias Iñiguez =

Filipino Catholic prelate (born 1940)

The Most Reverend Deogracias Iñiguez, Jr. D.D.
- Bishop Emeritus of Kalookan
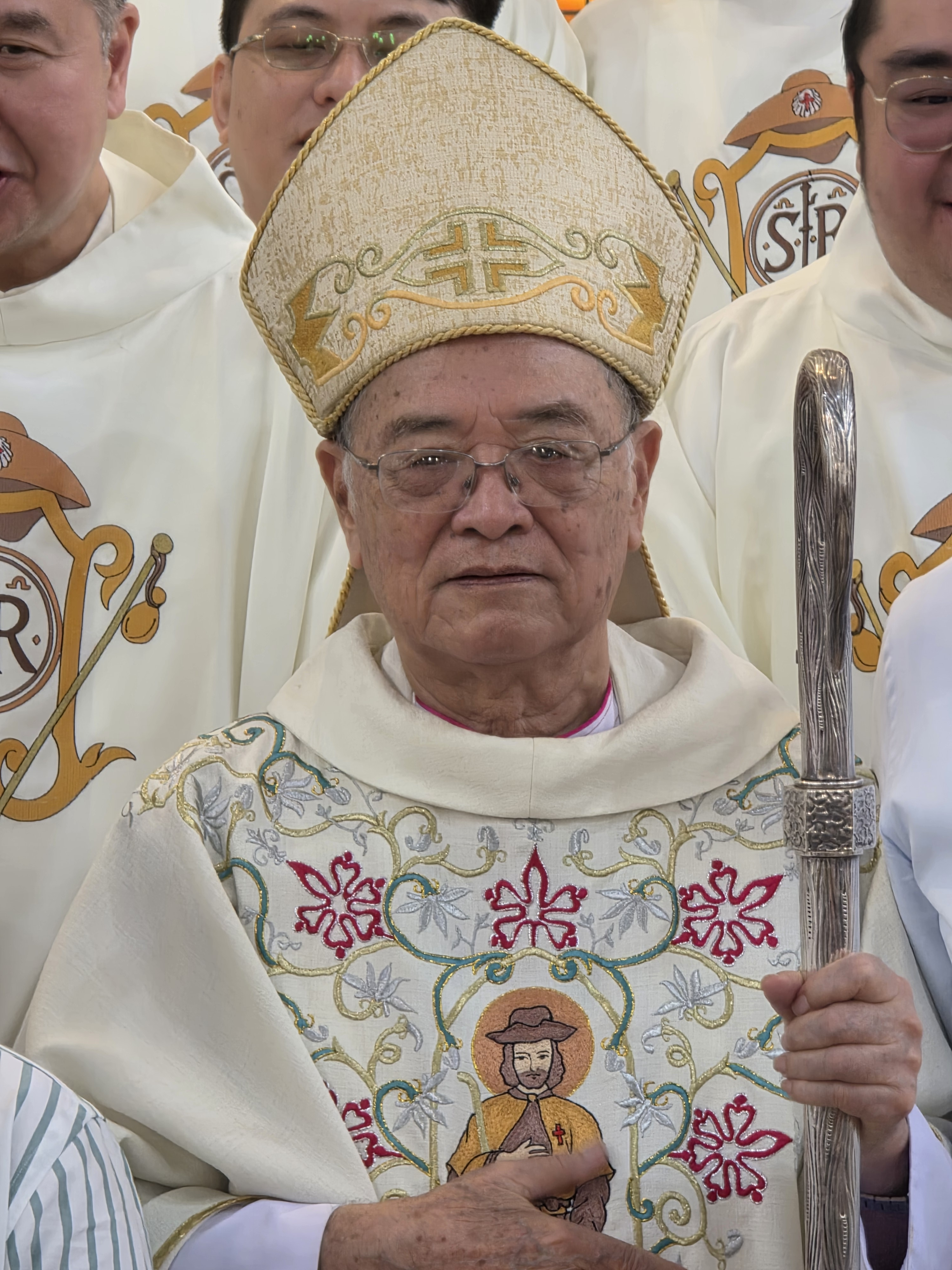
- Iñiguez in 2025
- Church: Catholic Church
- Province: Manila
- See: Kalookan (emeritus)
- Appointed: June 28, 2003
- Installed: August 22, 2003
- Term ended: January 25, 2013
- Predecessor: Diocese erected
- Successor: Pablo Virgilio David
- Previous posts: Auxiliary Bishop of Malolos and Titular Bishop of Claternae (1985–1989); Bishop of Iba (1989–2003)

Orders
- Ordination: December 23, 1963
- Consecration: August 22, 1985 by Bruno Torpigliani

Personal details
- Born: Deogracias Soriano Iñiguez, Jr. December 10, 1940 (age 85) Cotabato, Cotabato, Commonwealth of the Philippines
- Education: San Carlos Seminary; University of Santo Tomas
- Motto: Totius servus Christi (Latin for 'Servant of all Christ')
- Coat of arms

Styles of Deogracias Iñiguez, Jr.
- Reference style: His Excellency; The Most Reverend
- Spoken style: Your Excellency
- Religious style: Bishop

Deogracias Soriano Iñiguez Jr. (born December 10, 1940) is a Filipino Catholic prelate who served as the first Bishop of Kalookan from 2003 until 2013.

== Early life and education ==
Deogracias Soriano Iñiguez Jr. was born on December 10, 1940, in Cotabato City. He studied theology at San Carlos Seminary and graduated from the University of Santo Tomas with a Bachelor of Education degree.

== Ministry ==
=== Priesthood ===
He was ordained a priest for the Diocese of Malolos on December 23, 1963. Following his ordination, he served as a professor at the Immaculate Conception Seminary, a role he held until his episcopal appointment in 1985. In 1970, he became the diocese's chancellor. From 1971 to 1972, he was the parish priest of Saint Mark the Evangelist in Calumpit. In 1984, he served at the National Shrine of Our Lady of Fatima as its parish priest.

=== Episcopate ===
Pope John Paul II appointed him Auxiliary Bishop of Malolos on July 3, 1985, assigning him the titular see of Claternae. He was consecrated by Bruno Torpigliani, the Apostolic Nuncio to the Philippines, on August 22.

On December 27, 1989, he was appointed Bishop of Iba. He took possession of the see on March 3, 1990.

On June 28, 2003, John Paul II promulgated the apostolic constitution Quoniam Quælibet, establishing the Diocese of Kalookan. Iñiguez was then appointed to lead the new diocese. He was installed at San Roque Cathedral on August 22, 2003, in the presence of Cardinal Jaime Sin, Apostolic Nuncio Antonio Franco, and Cardinal Ricardo Vidal.

In July 2011, Iñiguez, as the chairman of the public affairs committee of the Catholic Bishops' Conference of the Philippines (CBCP), called for a boycott on an exhibit containing an installation art piece by artist Mideo Cruz, which, according to Iñiguez, was sacrilegious.

Pope Benedict XVI accepted his resignation on January 25, 2013, at the age of 72 — three years below the mandatory retirement age of 75. Subsequently, Francisco Mendoza de Leon, Auxiliary Bishop of Antipolo, was appointed as the apostolic administrator of the diocese. After a two-year vacancy, on October 14, 2015, Pope Francis appointed Pablo Virgilio David, Auxiliary Bishop of San Fernando, to succeed Iñiguez.

== Political views and involvement ==
On June 28, 2006, Iñiguez and opposition groups filed an impeachment complaint against President Gloria Macapagal Arroyo. In response, the Arroyo administration criticized the CBCP and called on the episcopal conference to sanction him, claiming that the complaint violated the separation of church and state. Iñiguez—an outspoken critic of Arroyo—clarified that he signed the complaint "on his own conviction"; he represented his group, Kilusang Makabansang Ekonomiya (KME; Filipino for 'National Economic Movement'), and received support from his fellow prelates.

Iñiguez supported calls for partial automation for the 2007 Philippine general election after the government initially shelved it due to time constraints. The first nationwide automated elections would only take place in 2010.

In 2017, he criticized the drug war of President Rodrigo Duterte, saying that he was "most responsible because of command responsibility".

After the amnesty of Senator Antonio Trillanes was revoked by Duterte in 2018, Iñiguez called for protests against the "state-sponsored confusion" and the arrest of opposition figures. He further said that the Duterte administration "blanketed the country in a moral crisis". In 2024, the Supreme Court of the Philippines affirmed the validity of Trillanes's amnesty and voided its revocation.

Catholic Church titles
| New diocese | Bishop of Kalookan; August 22, 2003 – January 25, 2013 | Succeeded by Pablo Virgilio David |
| Preceded by Paciano Aniceto | Bishop of Iba; March 3, 1990 – June 28, 2003 | Succeeded by Florentino Lavarias |
| Preceded by Ricardo Vidal | — TITULAR — Bishop of Claternae; August 22, 1985 – December 27, 1989 | Succeeded by Antonio Racelis Rañola |
