= St. James Academy (Malabon) =

Catholic school in Malabon, Philippines

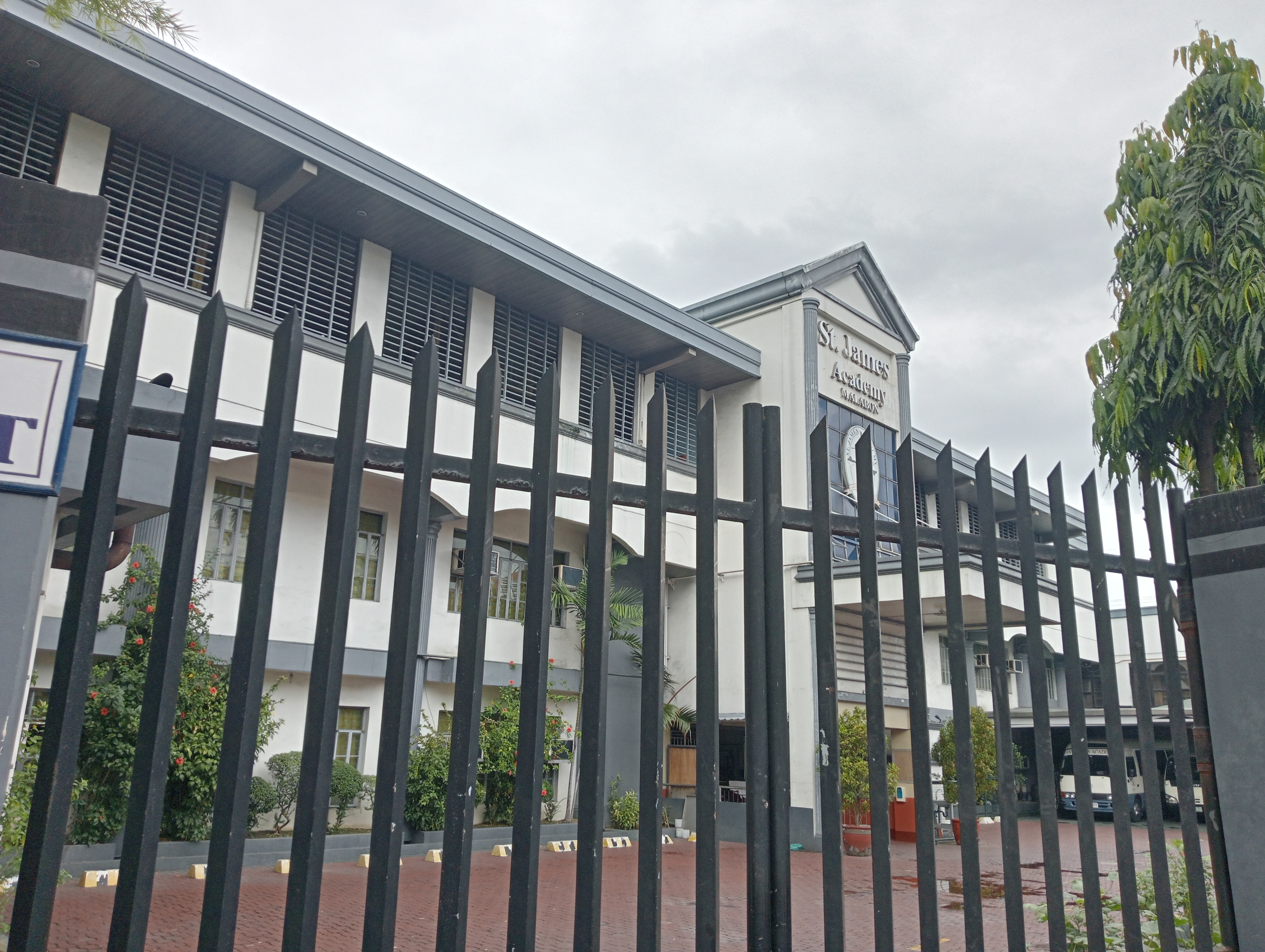
- School facade, November 2023

Location
- Rizal Avenue Extension, Barangay San Agustin, Malabon, Metro Manila; Philippines
- 14.658811°N 120.952016°E

Information
- Former name: Malabon Normal School (1926–1936)
- Type: Private
- Motto: Veritas, Pax, Justitia (Latin) (Truth, Peace, and Justice)
- Religious affiliation: Roman Catholic (Dominican)
- Patron saint: James the Greater
- Established: 1926
- Founder: Maryknoll Sisters
- Authority: Department of Education, Roman Catholic Diocese of Kalookan
- Oversight: Dominican Sisters of the Trinity
- Chairperson: Most. Rev. Pablo Virgilio David, D.D., Bishop of Kalookan (Note: The Kalookan Bishop sits as an ex-officio Chairperson of the Board of Trustees of St. James Academy and other schools owned by the Diocese of Kalookan.)
- Director: Sr. Nanita Handugan, O.P.
- Principal: Ma. Cristina Conche (basic education); Alfredo Rosete (night high school)
- Grades: K-12 (day), 7-10 (night)
- Colors: Blue and Gold
- Accreditation: PAASCU, (Note: The Basic Education Program (Kindergarten through Grade 10) has Level II accreditation, valid until 2030. The Senior High School (Grades 11 and 12) has a Level I accreditation, valid until 2028.) FAPE
- Newspaper: The Youngsters' Gazette (elementary), VOX (secondary)
- Yearbook: Echoes (elementary), Chimes (secondary)
- Affiliations: KADSA, MAPSA
- Website: stjamesacademy.edu.ph

St. James Academy (SJA) is a private Catholic school located in Malabon, Metro Manila, Philippines. It is owned by the Roman Catholic Diocese of Kalookan and currently managed by the Dominican Sisters of the Trinity.

Founded in 1926 by the Maryknoll Sisters, the school is known historically as the first Maryknoll school in the Philippines and the birthplace of Miriam College. The school offers kindergarten through senior high school programs and is a member of the Kalookan Diocese Schools Association (KADSA), Manila Ecclesiastical Province Schools Systems Association (MAPSA), and the Catholic Educational Association of the Philippines (CEAP).

== History ==
=== Early years and Maryknoll Administration (1926–1980) ===
In 1926, Archbishop of Manila Michael J. O'Doherty invited the Maryknoll Sisters of St. Dominic to the Philippines to establish a Catholic teacher-training program. The sisters utilized an Augustinian convent beside the San Bartolome Parish in Malabon to house the Malabon Normal School.

This site served as the first mission of the Maryknoll Sisters in the country. In 1936, the collegiate department was transferred to Isaac Peral Street in Manila, and later to Quezon City, eventually becoming Maryknoll College.

The Malabon campus continued to operate with elementary and high school departments. In 1936, it was renamed St. James Academy after Bishop James Anthony Walsh, co-founder of the Maryknoll Fathers.

During the World War II, the school was shut down by the Japanese forces and the nuns were interned at the Los Baños internment camp in Laguna and at the Santo Tomas Internment Camp in Manila. The lay teachers, on the other hand, continued conducting classes at the nearby Punzalan Residence.

The Maryknoll Sisters reopened the school in 1946 and continued to manage the administration of the school until 1980.

=== Dominican Sisters' management (1980–present) ===
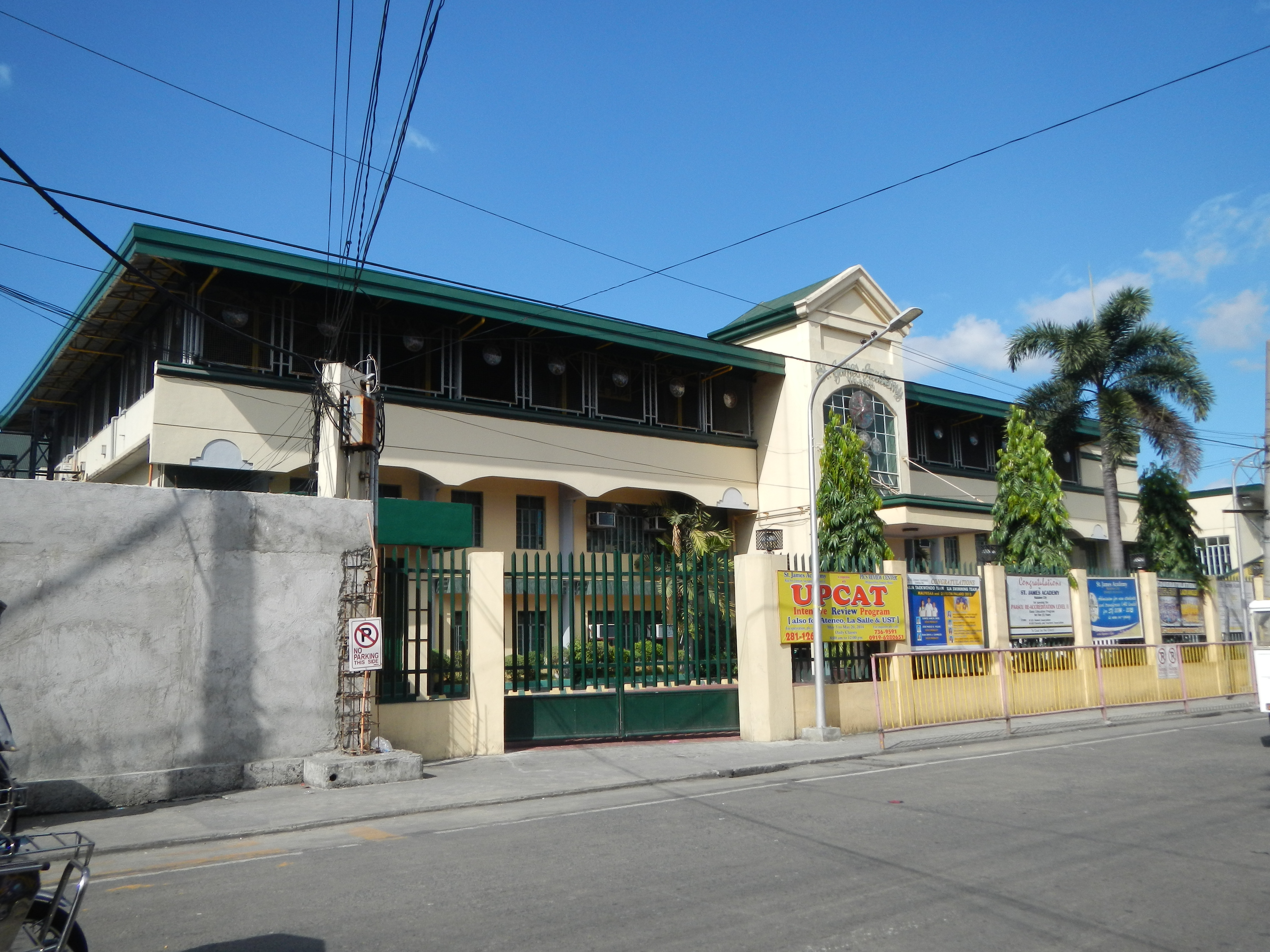
School facade, December 2013

In 1980, the Maryknoll sisters transferred the ownership of the school to the Archdiocese of Manila and handed over its management to the Dominican Sisters of St. Catherine of Siena.

In 2002, the Siena sisters established a night high school program designed to serve students from low-income families in the vicinity. From its inception until 2022, this program utilized a five-year junior high school curriculum. The program remains active today but has since transitioned to the standard four-year junior high school curriculum.

Following the creation of the Diocese of Kalookan in 2003, the ownership and jurisdiction over the school was transferred to the new diocese.

In 2010, the administration of the school was transferred to the Dominican Sisters of the Trinity, who continue to manage the daily operations and religious formation of the students under the superintendency of the Diocese of Kalookan.

== Campus ==
The school is situated in Rizal Avenue Extension, Barangay San Agustin, Malabon, adjacent to the San Bartolome Church and near the city hall, Ospital ng Malabon, and Malabon Central Market.

The campus accommodate the preschool, elementary, junior high, and senior high school levels. Facilities include two gymnasiums, a convent, a chapel, and an auditorium.

== Academics ==
St. James Academy follows the K-12 curriculum mandated by the Department of Education.

The academic program is organized into four main divisions: Preschool (Kindergarten), Elementary School (Grades 1 to 6), Junior High School (Grades 7 to 10), and Senior High School (Grades 11 to 12).

The Junior High School division offers two distinct programs: the Regular School Program and the Night High School Program. The Night High School, originally established in 2002 to assist students from low-income families, previously followed a five-year curriculum but has since transitioned to the standard four-year Junior High School curriculum.

The Senior High School program offers the Academic Track, which includes strands in Science, Technology, Engineering, and Mathematics (STEM); Accountancy, Business, and Management (ABM); Humanities and Social Sciences (HUMSS); and General Academic Strand (GAS).

As a Catholic institution, the school integrates religious formation into its curriculum, making Christian Living Education a compulsory subject for all students.

The school's basic education program possess Level II accreditation (for K-10) and Level I accreditation (for Grades 11 and 12) from the Philippine Accrediting Association of Schools, Colleges and Universities (PAASCU).

== Alumni ==
The following individuals attended or graduated from St. James Academy include:

=== Politics and government ===
- Juan Ponce Enrile, politician and lawyer; former Minister of Defense and Senate President of the Philippines
- Lean Alejandro, student leader and activist during the Marcos dictatorship and early days of Corazon Aquino administration
- Canuto Oreta, mayor of Malabon (2004-2012)

=== Academe ===
- Alex Magno, political scientist
- Soledad Reyes, Philippine literature scholar
- Paz Adriano, educator; first lay president of Maryknoll College
- Rosario Oreta Lapus, educator; fifth president of Miriam College

=== Business and industry ===
- Antonino Aquino, corporate executive at Ayala Group

=== Religion ===
- Benjamin de Jesus, Catholic prelate; former apostolic vicar of Jolo
- Rolando Santos, Catholic bishop; bishop emeritus of Alotau-Sideia

=== Media, arts, and entertainment ===
- Armida Siguion-Reyna, actress and singer; former MTRCB Chairperson
- Evelyn Camus, beauty queen; Binibining Pilipinas-International 1971
- Eunice Lagusad, actress
- Sara Jane Paez, beauty queen; Binibining Pilipinas-Universe 1989
- Gary Ignacio, singer and main vocalist of the rock band Alamid
- Dexter Falcelo, guitarist of the rock band Alamid
- Ninong Ry, vlogger and chef
- Mav Gonzales, reporter
- Doris Dumlao, journalist
- Vergel Santos, journalist; trustee of Center for Media Freedom and Responsibility

=== Sports ===
- Amanda Villanueva, volleyball athlete
- Ella de Jesus, volleyball athlete

== See also ==
- Miriam College, a higher education institution in Quezon City that originated as the college department of the Malabon Normal School, now St. James Academy.
- San Pedro College, the first Dominican Sisters of the Trinity-run school in the Philippines
- De La Salle Araneta University
- St. Gabriel Academy
- Diocese of Kalookan
