= Caloocan City Science High School =

Public high school in Caloocan, Philippines

- Mataas na Paaralang Pang-Agham ng Lungsod ng Caloocan (Filipino)
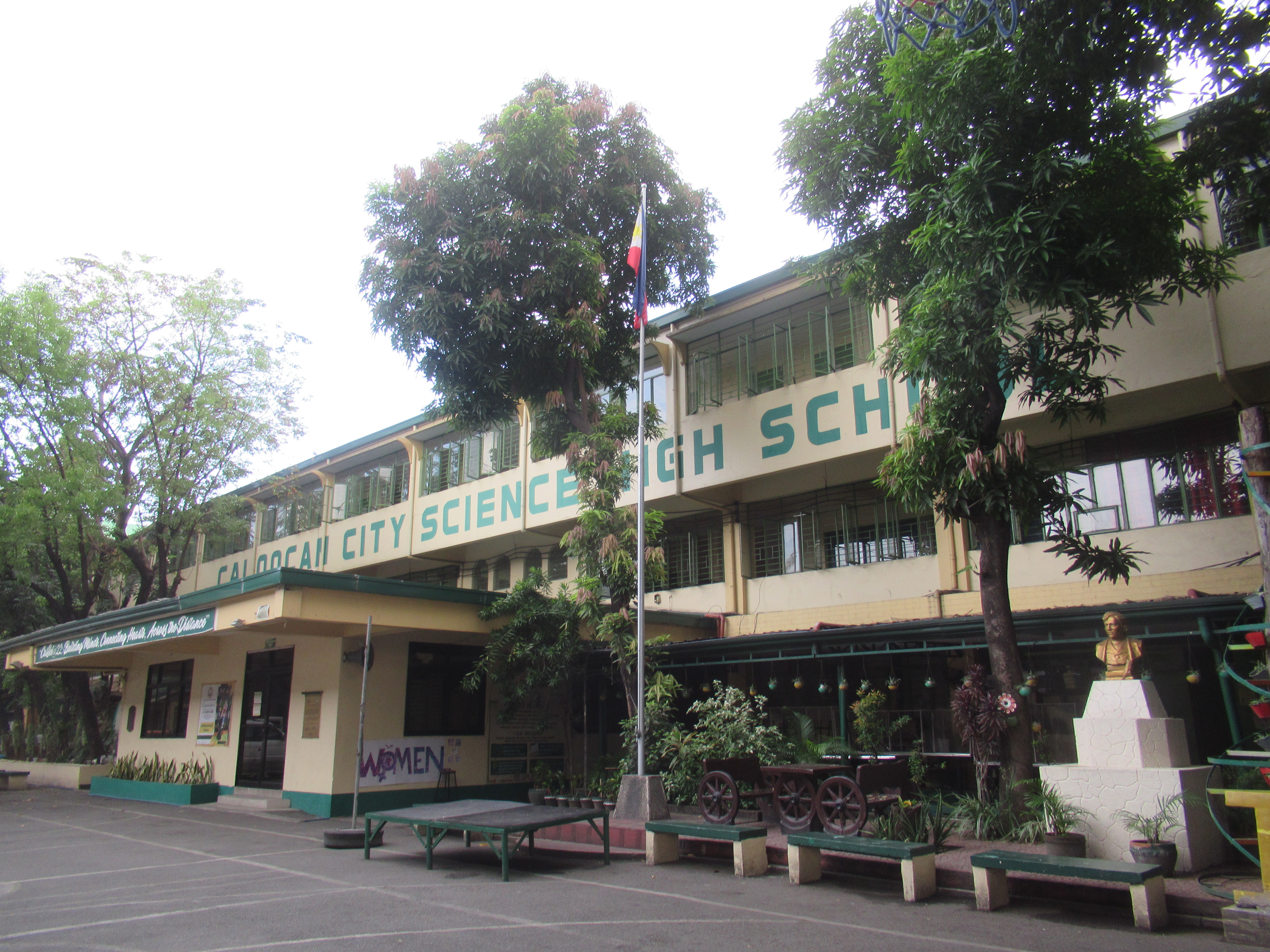

Location
- 10th Avenue; Caloocan, Metro Manila; Philippines; 14°39′05″N 120°58′50″E

Information
- Type: Public, Science High School
- Motto: "Excellence is our Lifestyle" "Dangal, Talino, Tatak Kalsayeñyo"
- Established: 1998
- Principal: Dr. Regilito D. Laurel
- Grades: 7-12
- Language: English, Filipino, Mandarin Chinese, French, Nihongo
- Campus: Urban
- Colors: Green , Yellow , Blue
- Publication: The Cell (English), Ang Sihay (Filipino)

Caloocan City Science High School (CCSHS, CalSci, or Kalsay), is a public secondary science school in Caloocan, Metro Manila, Philippines.

== History ==
Caloocan City Science High School stands behind the Division Office along 10th Avenue corner P. Sevilla Street in Grace Park. The school came into existence through Dr. Victoria Q. Fuentes, the Schools Division Superintendent, and Mayor Rey Malonzo who saw the need for a science high school for talented students of the city.

In July 1998, 360 students of the Department of Science and Technology Special Science Classes from the Caloocan High School were housed on a newly renovated Sangguniang Panglungsod, a three-story building at the back of the Division Office. The building has eight academic rooms, a library, stockroom two computer rooms, a small guidance office, an audiovisual room where programs are held, the Office of the Principal, and a Faculty room. Erice is the sponsor of the Ordinance 0257 Series of 1998 (Proposed Ordinance 0790) "An Ordinance Establishing the Caloocan City Science High School to be funded by the Local School Board and the General Fund of the City Government.

On October 23, 1998, the Caloocan City Science High School was inaugurated with Malonzo and Fuentes as principal sponsors.

In September of the same year, upon the promotion to Assistant Schools Division Superintendent of Lourdes Faustino, the newly appointed Principal Esmilita P. Ulangca and Maria Paz Marcelo, the designated Assistant to the Principal, promulgated the guidelines for the admission of freshmen to CCSHS. Thereafter, a selection test was administered to incoming first-year students. To qualify for admission, the applicants should pass the examination, which consists of proficiency tests in English, Science and Mathematics, and Logical Reasoning for the first round, and an interview for the second round. A 60%–40% aggregate score of the examinee decides their admission to the school.

Through the local school board funding, the school was able to acquire science equipment and 50 computers with printers.

In 2000 the school ranked first in the Division of Caloocan, 6th in the National Capital Region, and 14th in the National Level in the 2000 National Secondary Aptitude test.

In July 2000 the school established its autonomous Student Government with Mary Jane Toledana as the first president and Ferdinand A. de Leon in his capacity as the Coordinator of the Student government.

In 2008, the school became an independent high school, thus the school is no longer under the arms of its mother school, Caloocan High School. The announcement was made during the 9th Commencement Exercises, March 27, 2009.

In January 2009, Caloocan City Science High School was officially recognized as an independent science high school by the National Capital Region office of the Department of Education (DepEd).

The school provides Mandarin, Nihongo, and French language classes under DepEd's Special Program in Foreign Language.

== Clubs ==
Academic Clubs

- Araling Panlipunan Club (Tribo Kalsayeñyo)
- The Inclinators Club (formerly Hypotenusean Club)
- Science Club (The Catalyst)
- Filipino Club (Samahang Filipino)
- English Club (Language Club)
- STEM Club
- MAPEH Club (formerly divided into 3 clubs: Music, Sports, and Dance)
- ICT Club

Interest Clubs

- Teatro Kalsayeño
- Koro Kalsayeño (under MAPEH Club)
- Dance Club (inactive)
- YLIAD (inactive)
- Lusog-Isip Ng Kabataan (LINK) Club
- Youth for Environment in Schools Organization (YES-O) Club
- Campus Integrity Crusaders (CIC) Club
- Integrators Club (under CIC Club)
- BERT (Batang Empowered and Resilience Team) Club
- CACHET Club
- BSP (Boy Scouts of the Philippines)
- GSP (Girl Scouts of the Philippines)
- Kalsay RCY (Red Cross Youth)
