= St. Gabriel Academy =

Roman Catholic basic education school in Caloocan, Philippines

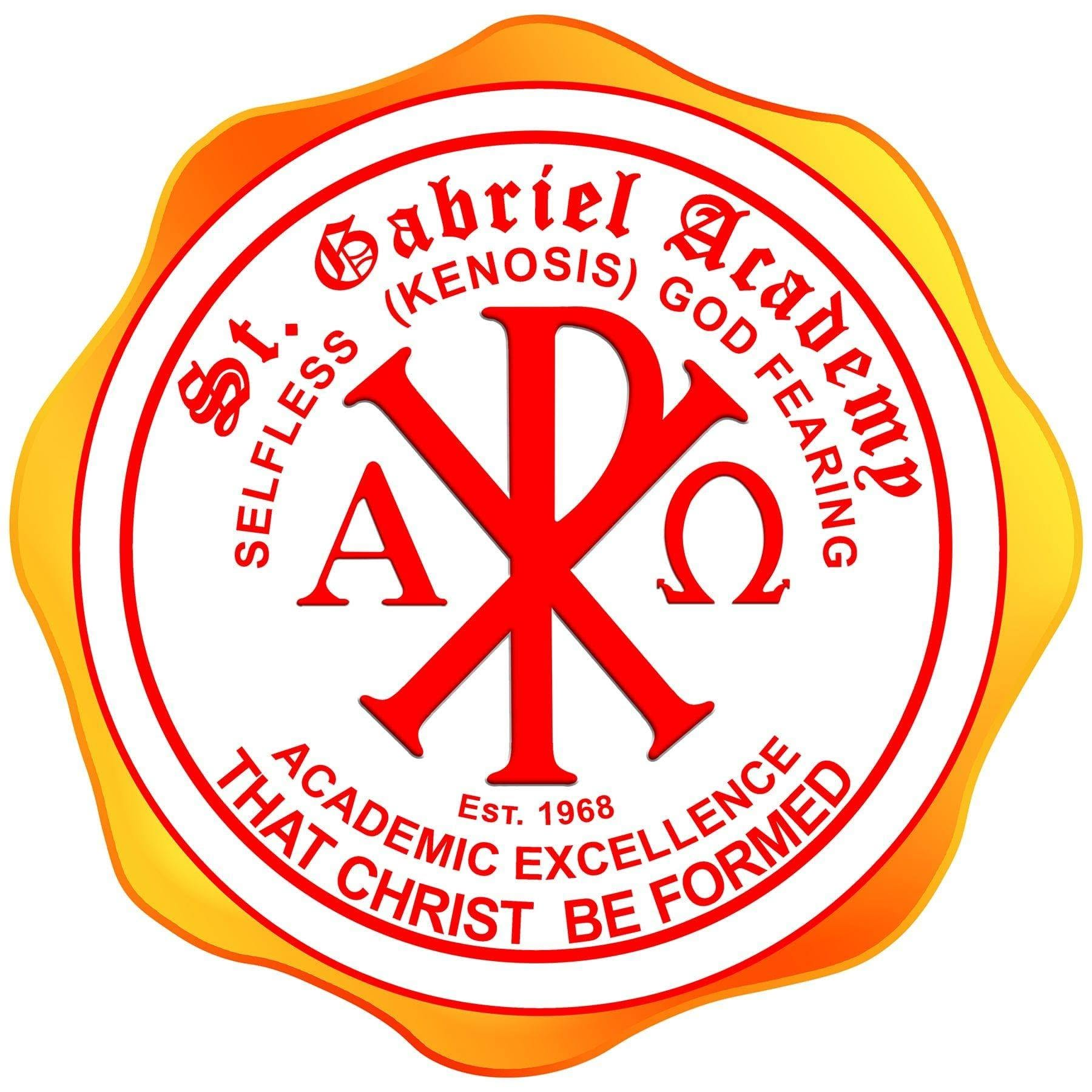

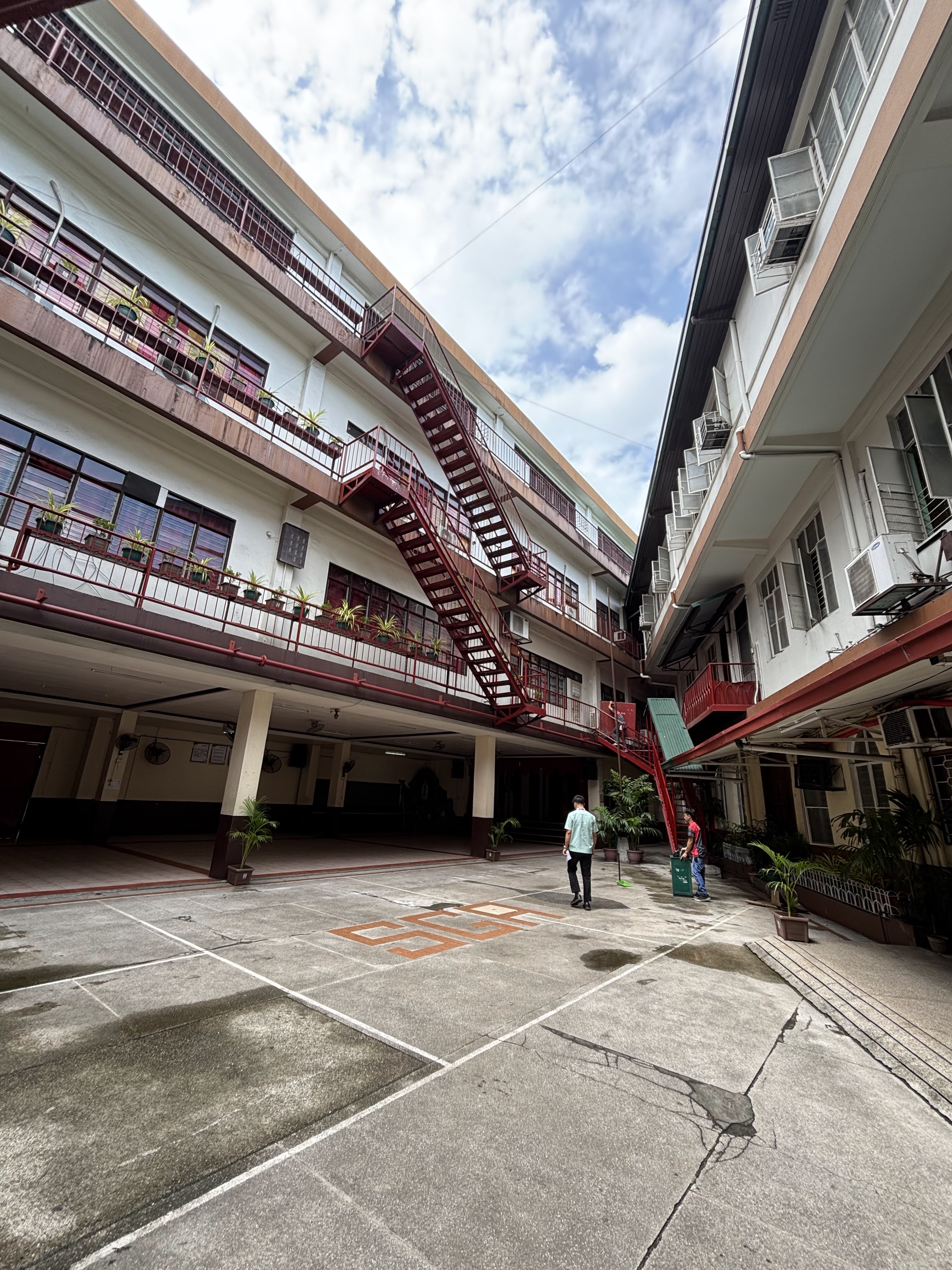

Location
- Araneta Avenue corner Caimito Road, Barangay 79; Caloocan, Metro Manila; Philippines
- 14°39′32″N 120°58′51″E

Information
- Type: Private Roman Catholic basic education school
- Religious affiliation: Catholic Church
- Established: 1968
- Principal: Rev. Fr. Kennedy A. Neral
- Chaplain: Rev. Fr. Phillippe Angelo G. Garcia
- Grades: Preschool to Grade 12
- Campus: Urban
- Affiliations: KADSA; MAPSA
- Website: Official website

St. Gabriel Academy (SGA) is a private Roman Catholic basic education school in Araneta Avenue, Barangay 79, Caloocan, Metro Manila, Philippines. It operates under the Roman Catholic Diocese of Kalookan and offers early childhood, elementary, junior high school, and senior high school programs.

== History ==
St. Gabriel Academy was established in 1968 by Msgr. Pacifico Mendoza. It began as a parish-based school and later expanded its academic programs to include elementary and secondary education.

In School Year 1968-1969, the school began its operation under the headship of Marie Lorraine, then the principal of St. James Academy, Malabon. It was agreed upon that all graduates of the St. Gabriel Academy would continue their secondary education at the St. James Academy.

The Sisters of Saint Paul of Chartres later became involved in the administration of the school. A 2011 study of the congregation's educational ministry in the Philippines lists St. Gabriel Academy in Caloocan among its schools in 1981 until 2016 when the Sisters of the St. Paul of Chartres handed on St. Gabriel Academy to the Diocese of Kalookan. Its full administration is under the tutelage of Pablo Virgilio S. David, the second Bishop of Diocese of Kalookan.

Currently, the school is administered as a diocesan institution under the Diocese of Kalookan.

== Administration ==
As of 2026, Rev. Fr. Kennedy A. Neral, PhD serves as the school's director and principal. Rev. Fr. Phillippe Angelo G. Garcia serves as school chaplain.

== Affiliations and government programs ==
St. Gabriel Academy is a member of the Kalookan Diocese Schools Association (KADSA) and the Manila Ecclesiastical Province School Systems Association (MAPSA).

The school is listed by the Department of Education as an Education Service Contracting participating school under ESC ID 1401910 and DepEd school ID 406699. It is also included in the Department of Education's Senior High School Voucher Program directory.
