= San Roque Cathedral Ministry of Altar Servers =

Catholic brotherhood

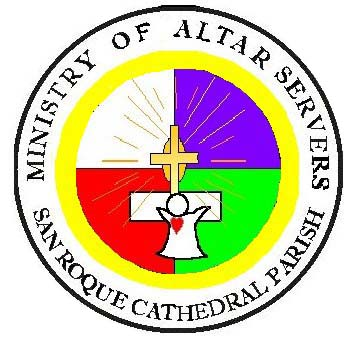
The insignia of the Ministry of Altar Servers

The Ministry of Altar Servers of San Roque Cathedral, formerly known as Knights of the Altar, is a Catholic brotherhood of males over the age of nine who stand as Altar servers at San Roque Parish Cathedral. It was instituted by a small group of young men affiliated with the San Roque Parish Cathedral when the church started as a small chapel. However, it had no formal organization until the 1950s when it finally adopted the name Knights of the Altar, becoming the official altar servers of then San Roque Parish Cathedral.

== The Insignia ==
The organization had no previous formal logo. The organizational logo is stylized as a characterization of the service that the altar servers are doing which is composed of the following symbolization:

- The Four colors (white, violet, red and green) - represent the four liturgical colors appropriate moods to a season of the liturgical year or may highlight a special occasion where (Red – blood/fire, Green – life, growth, hope, Violet- penance, atonement, expiation, and White - Purity, Holiness, Joy, Innocence and Triumph)
- The figure wearing long clothing with a heart and semi-emphasized head signify the Altar servers themselves that offer their services holistically and with love and wisdom to the youth, the people and mainly to God. The clothing represents the vestment used by them including the cassock (sutana) and a worn-over surplice.
- The cross with light rays represent God who died in the cross for the redemption from our sins and the light that gives us life and guidance. The Rectangular Shaped figure represents the altar where the Altar Servers function.
- The Gold Color (which is also one of the liturgical colors that functions as a default) represents the possession of the altar servers with relaxation and enjoyment of life, good health, promotion of courage, confidence and willpower in all of their meaningful activities within the liturgical year of the Catholic faith.
- Surrounding the enclosed colored cold line are the words “Ministry of Altar Servers” which is the name of the organization itself and below is “San Roque Parish Cathedral” which means that it is the base of the institution.
- The Circle symbolizes the continuation of the service, life and the generation of the organization.

== Revisions ==
The insignia of the San Roque Cathedral Ministry of Altar Servers has undergone series' of revisions. However, the former Public Relations Officer, Mark Journel Quero has completed its modification and later approved for use dated January 2007. It was formally introduced in a Lenten Pilgrimage, April 2007, as it was printed on the shirts and worn by the altar server pilgrims.
