= Caloocan Cathedral =

Roman Catholic church in Caloocan, Philippines

- San Roque Cathedral Parish
- Catedral-Parroquia de San Roque (Spanish); Ecclesiae Cathedralis a Sancti Rochi in loco v.d. Caloocan (Latin); Parokya ng Katedral ni San Roque (Filipino)
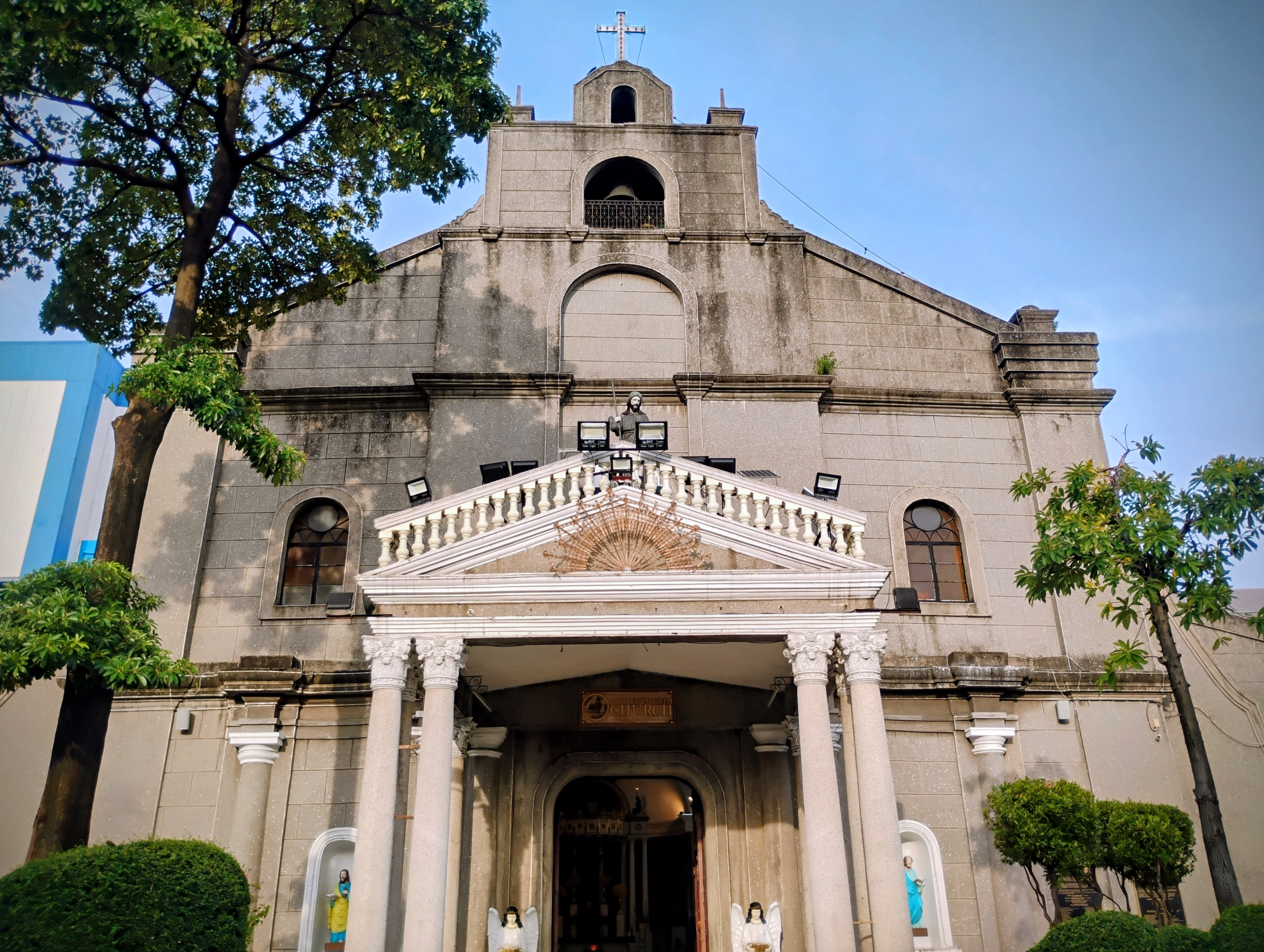
- Caloocan Cathedral in 2025

- Location in Metro Manila Location in Luzon Location in the Philippines
- 14°39′1″N 120°58′22″E
- Location: Caloocan
- Country: Philippines
- Denomination: Roman Catholic

History
- Former name: San Roque Parish
- Status: Cathedral
- Founded: April 8, 1815; 211 years ago
- Founder(s): Juan Antonio Zulaibar y Aldape, Archbishop of Manila
- Dedication: Saint Roch; Nuestra Señora de la Soterraña de Nieva (secondary patroness)
- Dedicated: December 12, 2015

Architecture
- Functional status: Active
- Architect: Marcos De Guzman
- Style: Baroque

Administration
- Archdiocese: Manila
- Diocese: Kalookan
- Parish: San Roque

Clergy
- Bishop: Pablo Virgilio S. David
- Rector: Rufino “Gigi” Yabut
- Priest: Pablo Virgilio S. David (parish priest)

San Roque Cathedral Parish, commonly known as Caloocan Cathedral (Filipino: Katedral ng Kalookan/Caloocan), is the cathedral or seat of the Roman Catholic Diocese of Kalookan, located near the intersection of 10th Avenue and A. Mabini Street in Poblacion, Caloocan, Metro Manila, Philippines. The church is located some meters away from the poblacion or central vicinity of the city. Its present parish priest is Cardinal Pablo Virgilio David, the Bishop of Kalookan, and its rector is Rufino “Gigi” Yabut.

The cathedral is dedicated to Saint Roch, known as San Roque in the Philippines.

== History ==
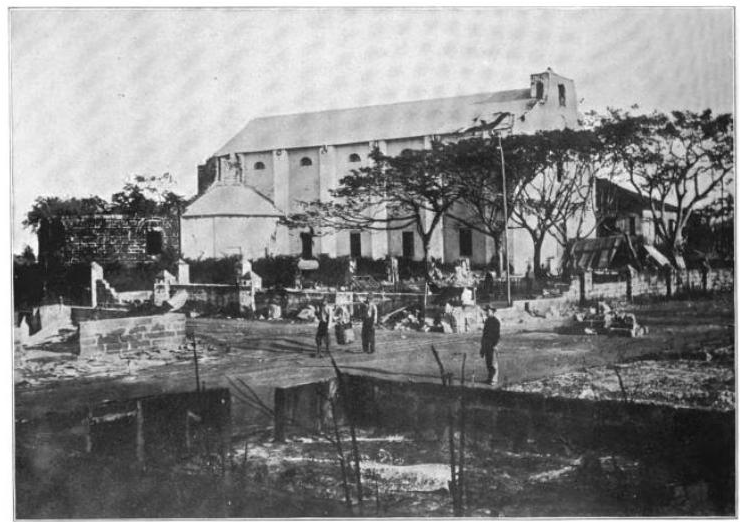
Caloocan Church shortly after the attack by American forces on February 10, 1899

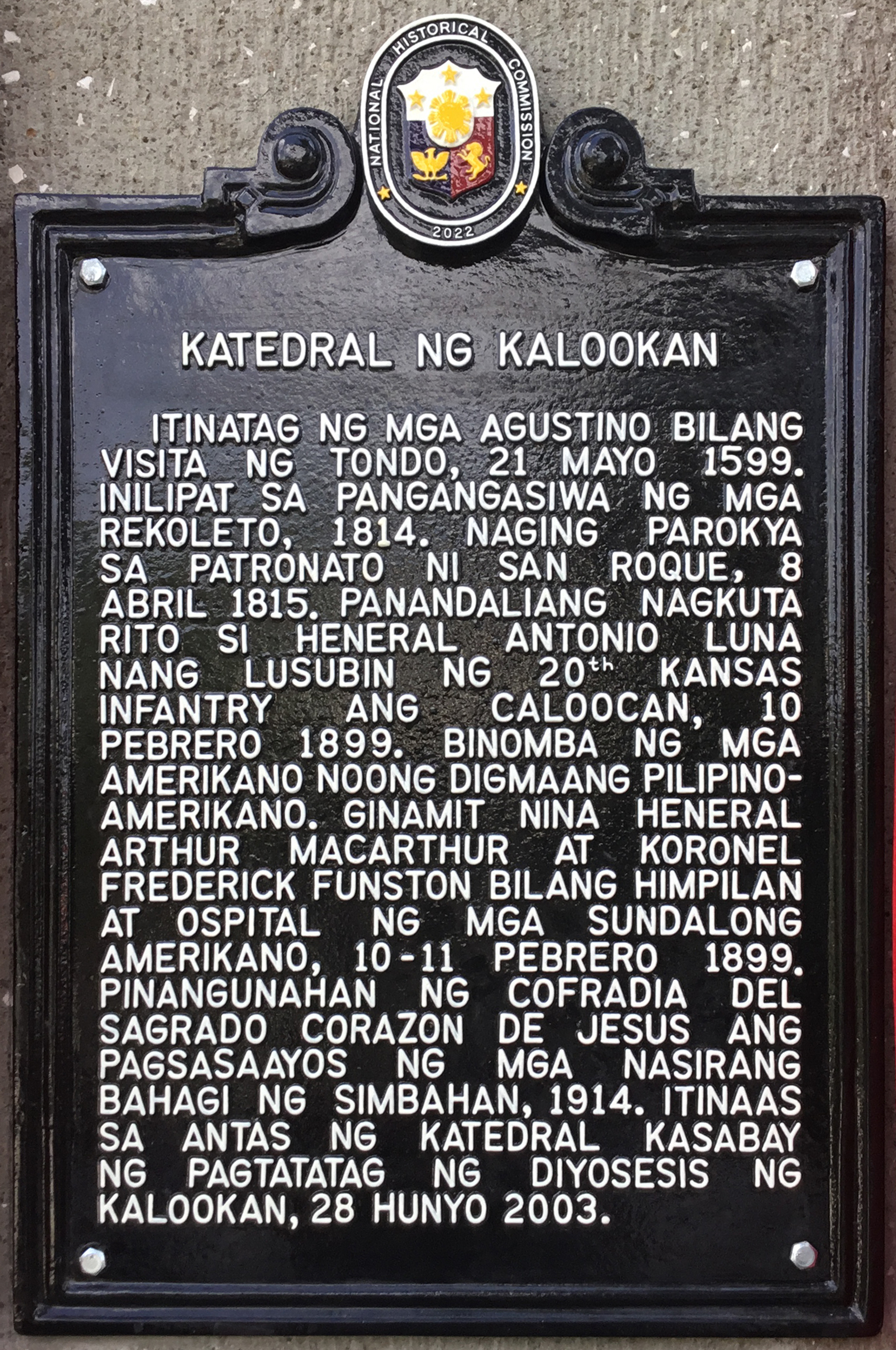
Church NHC historical marker installed in 2022

The parish started as a small visita (chapel-of-ease) initiated by Manuel Vaquero, assistant priest of Tondo, Manila, who with the cooperation of the people also built a place of worship in one of the districts of Caloocan called Libis Aromahan (Sitio de Espinas) in 1765. The priest gave this community two statues: San Roque and the Nuestra Señora de la Soterraña de Nieva (Virgin of Nieva in Segovia, Spain). The church was erected a parish on April 8, 1815, by the Archbishop of Manila Juan Antonio de Zulaibar with Manuel de San Miguel as the first parish priest. Its formal erection as an independent parish also marked the transfer of the church to its present site. This site was called Paltok, an elevated district in the town of Caloocan. Construction began on a bigger church in 1819 under Vicente de San Francisco Xavier and was finished in 1847 under Cipriano Garcia.

In 1889, San Roque ceased as a parish as it did not meet requirements posted by the archbishop. The church could not raise the proper tributos y numero de las almas (tributes and alms) prescribed by the archbishop. Jose Aranguren revived San Roque into a parish upon his appointment as archbishop in 1892.

During the Philippine revolution against the Spaniards and later, against the Americans, San Roque Church served as the meeting place of the Katipuneros coming from the west coast of Manila going to Balintawak. On February 10, 1899, the church was partly destroyed by US forces during the Philippine–American War when Philippine revolutionary general Antonio Luna sought refuge at the church. After its capture, the Americans used the whole area as a field hospital. In 1900, American general Arthur MacArthur, Jr. invaded Caloocan and the church of San Roque was made caballeriza by the regiment of Col. Frederick Funston.

After the war, the church was re-constructed in 1914 by the Confradia de Sagrado Corazon de Jesus under the administration of parish priest Victor Raymundo.

Eusebio Carreon (1934) put black and white tiles along the aisles. Pedro Abad (1947) renovated the façade and Pedro Vicedo (1962) built additional wings on both sides of the church.

The church deteriorated over the years. In 1977, Augurio Juta planned a new church but this plan did not materialize due to his abrupt transfer to Santa Ana, Taguig, in December 1979. He was succeeded by Boanerges "Ben" A. Lechuga, who renovated the church. It was blessed on November 30, 1981, by Manila Cardinal Jaime Sin.

In the Jubilee Year 2000, San Roque Church was declared one of the Jubilee Churches in the Roman Catholic Archdiocese of Manila.

Pope John Paul II, in his apostolic letter "Quoniam Quaelibet" of June 28, 2003, created the new Diocese of Kalookan, consisting of south Caloocan, Malabon and Navotas (CAMANA Area), and elevated the church to a cathedral. The Pope appointed Deogracias S. Iñiguez, Bishop of Iba, Zambales, as the first bishop of the diocese. He took possession of the diocese on August 22, 2003. Boanerges "Ben" Lechuga, then parish priest during that time, was the first cathedral rector and the first vicar-general of the diocese. In 2008, Bishop Iñiguez took over as parish priest soon after Lechuga's early retirement, and served until 2013, coterminal to his term as bishop. After, Elpidio Erlano Jr. became the acting parish priest and rector of the cathedral for six months, until the diocese's apostolic administrator, Bishop Francisco M. de Leon, named Gaudioso Sustento as parish priest and rector. In February 2017, Jerome Cruz, Vicar-General of the Diocese, was installed as the new rector of the cathedral.

On December 12, 2015, the faithful of Caloocan witnessed the Solemn Rite of the Dedication of the San Roque Cathedral as the newly renovated altar-sanctuary has been finally completed. The Eucharistic Celebration for the dedication and opening of the Holy Door for the celebration of the Extraordinary Jubilee of Mercy was officiated by Francisco Mendoza de Leon, Apostolic Administrator of Kalookan.

On December 11, 2015, a relic from the bone of San Roque was brought out for public veneration in a vigil in preparation for the dedication of the cathedral. The relic was a gift from Pope Francis for the 200th anniversary of the parish, which was deposited to the altar table during the dedication rite.

Last August 13, 2017, another bone relic of San Roque was given to the cathedral from the Chapel of the Holy Relics in Cebu.

== Parish priests ==
Name	Tenure
Pedro Abad	1947–1957
Pedro Vicedo	1957–1977
Augurio Juta	1977–1979
Boanerges Lechuga	December 1979 – October 2008
Deogracias Iñiguez	October 2008 – January 2013
Elpidio Erlano Jr.	January 2013 – July 2013
Rafael Gaudioso A. Sustento	July 2013 – January 2, 2016
Pablo Virgilio S. David	January 5, 2017 – present

== Gallery ==
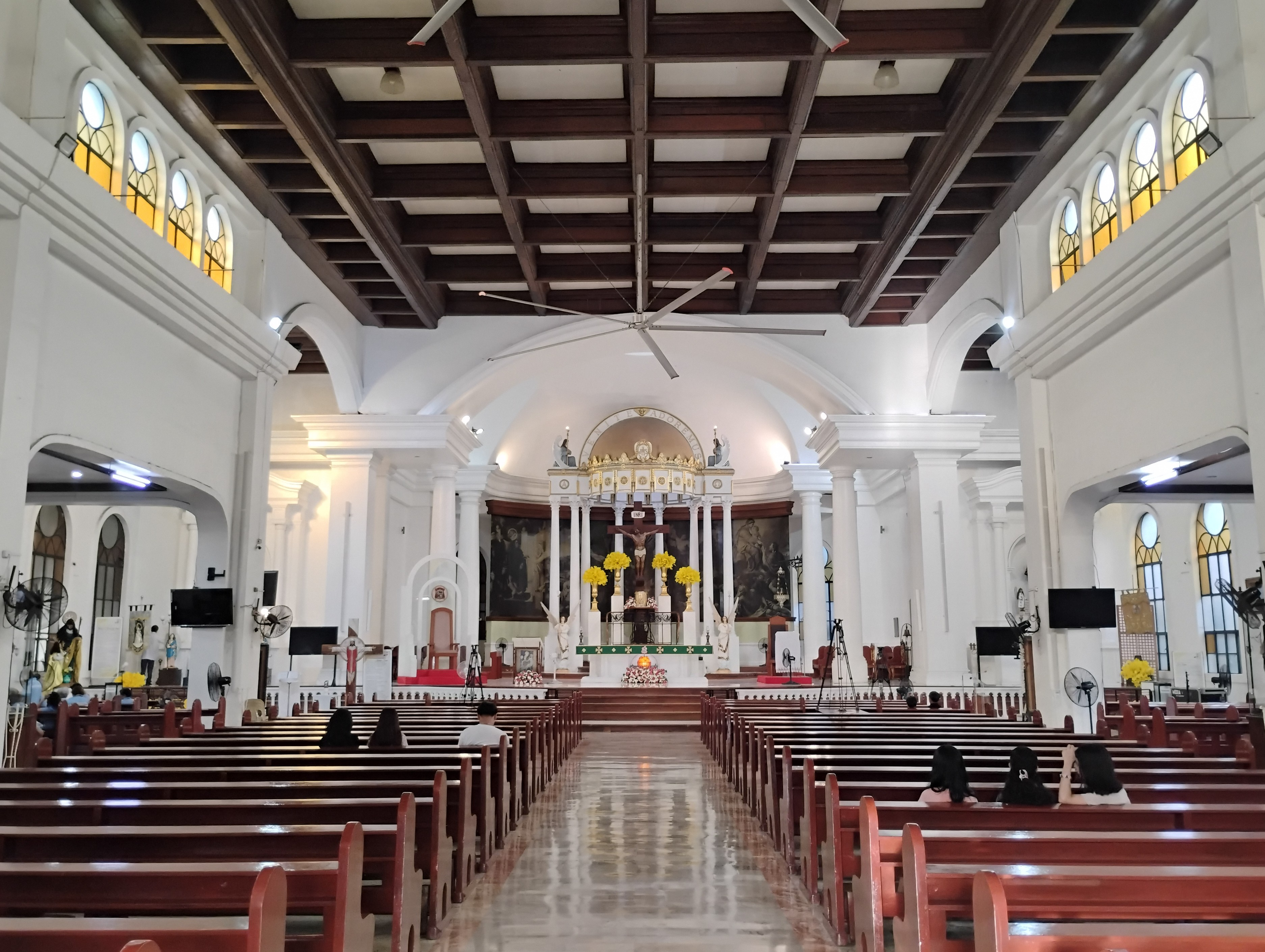
Cathedral interior in 2025

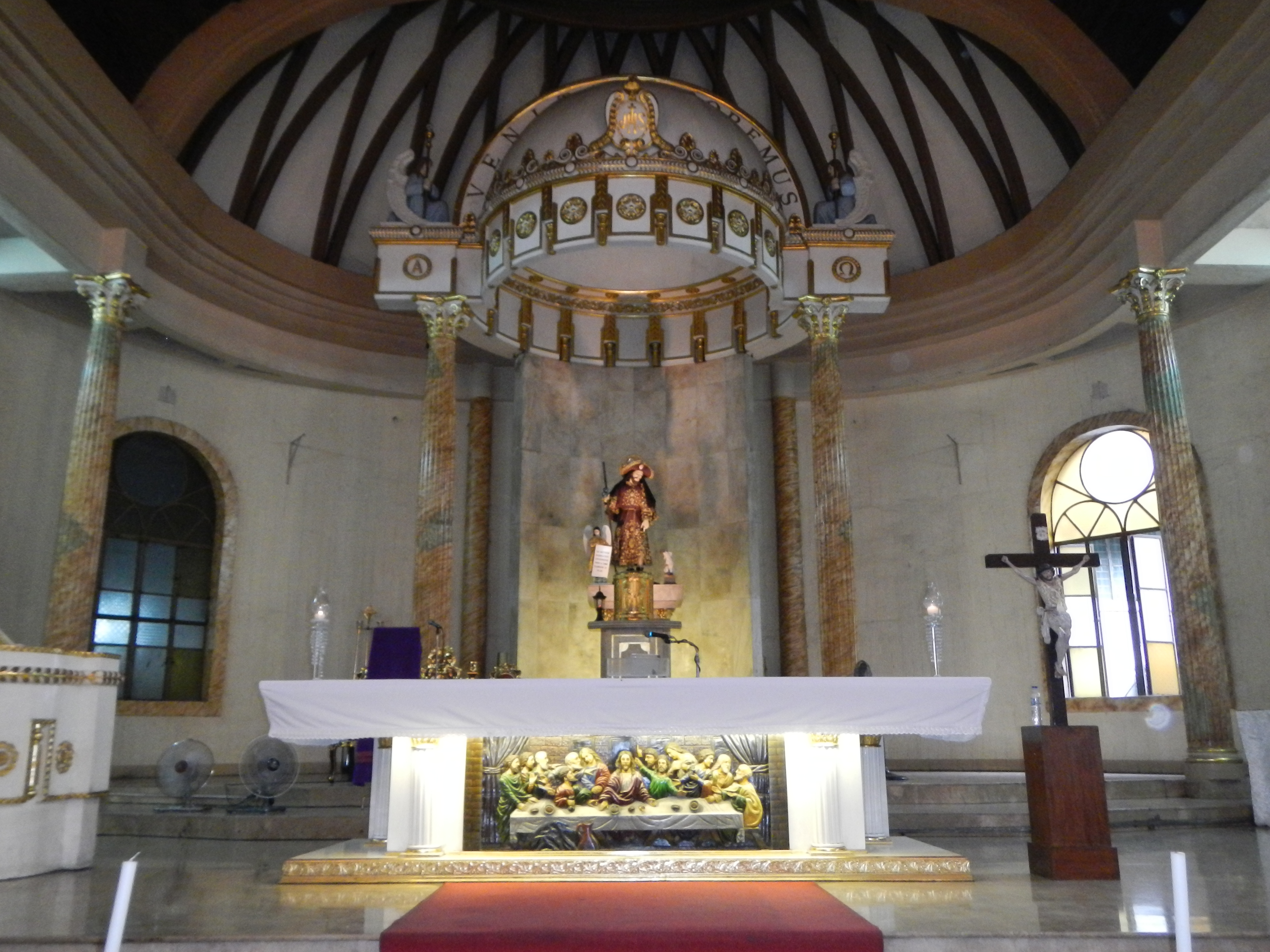
Cathedral main altar

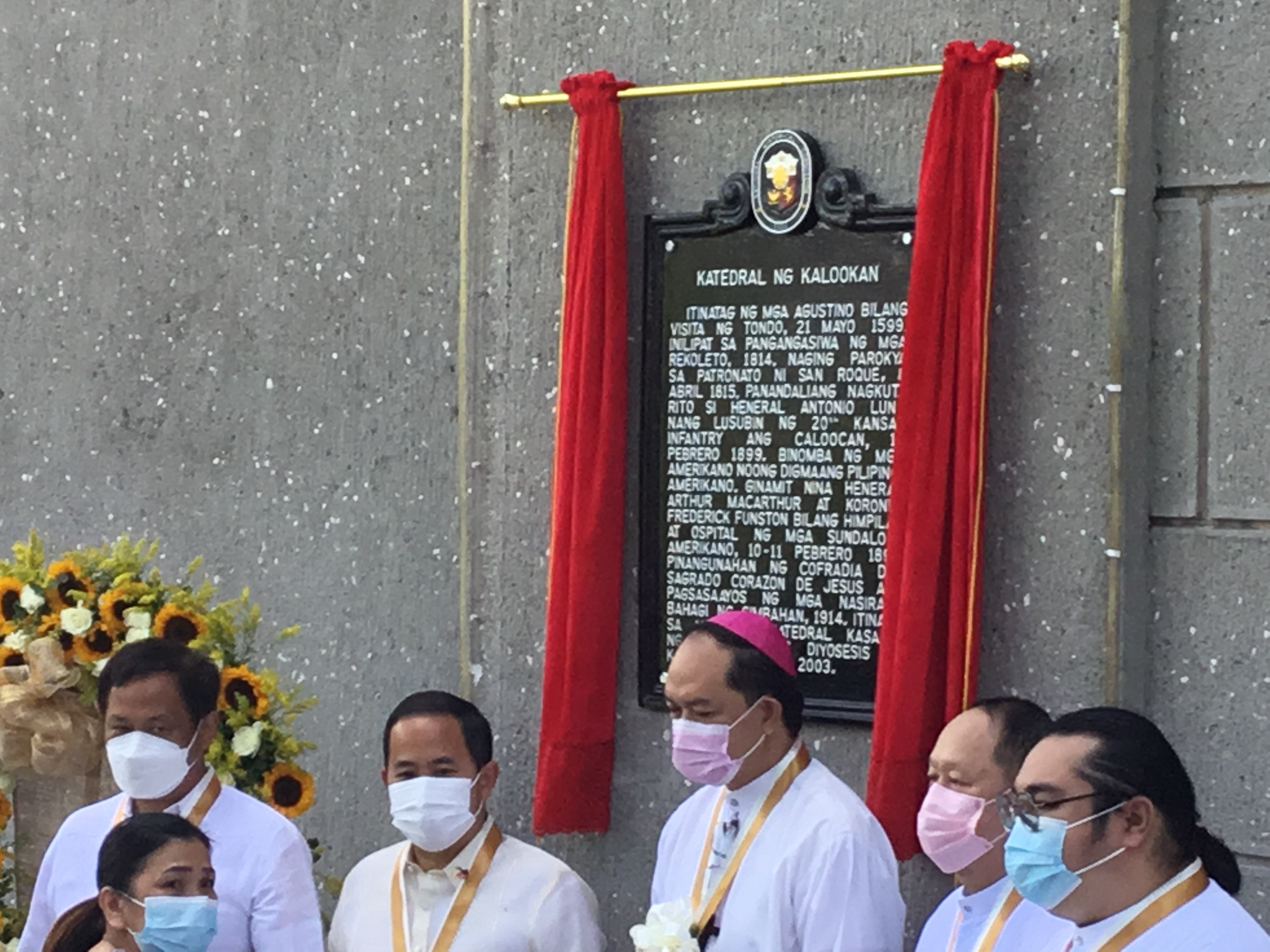
Unveiling of NHCP historical marker led by Bishop David, March 31, 2022

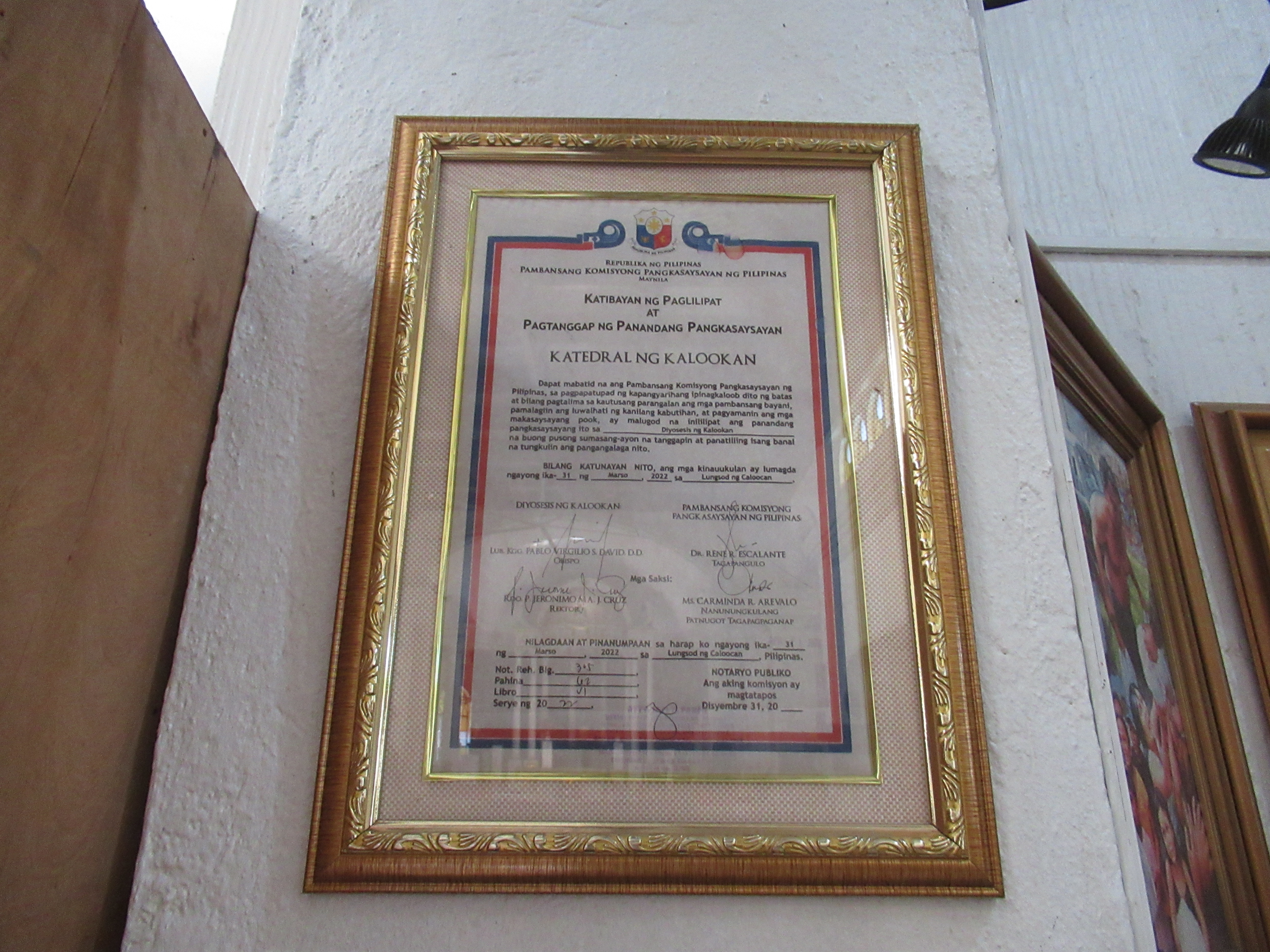
Historical marker, transfer

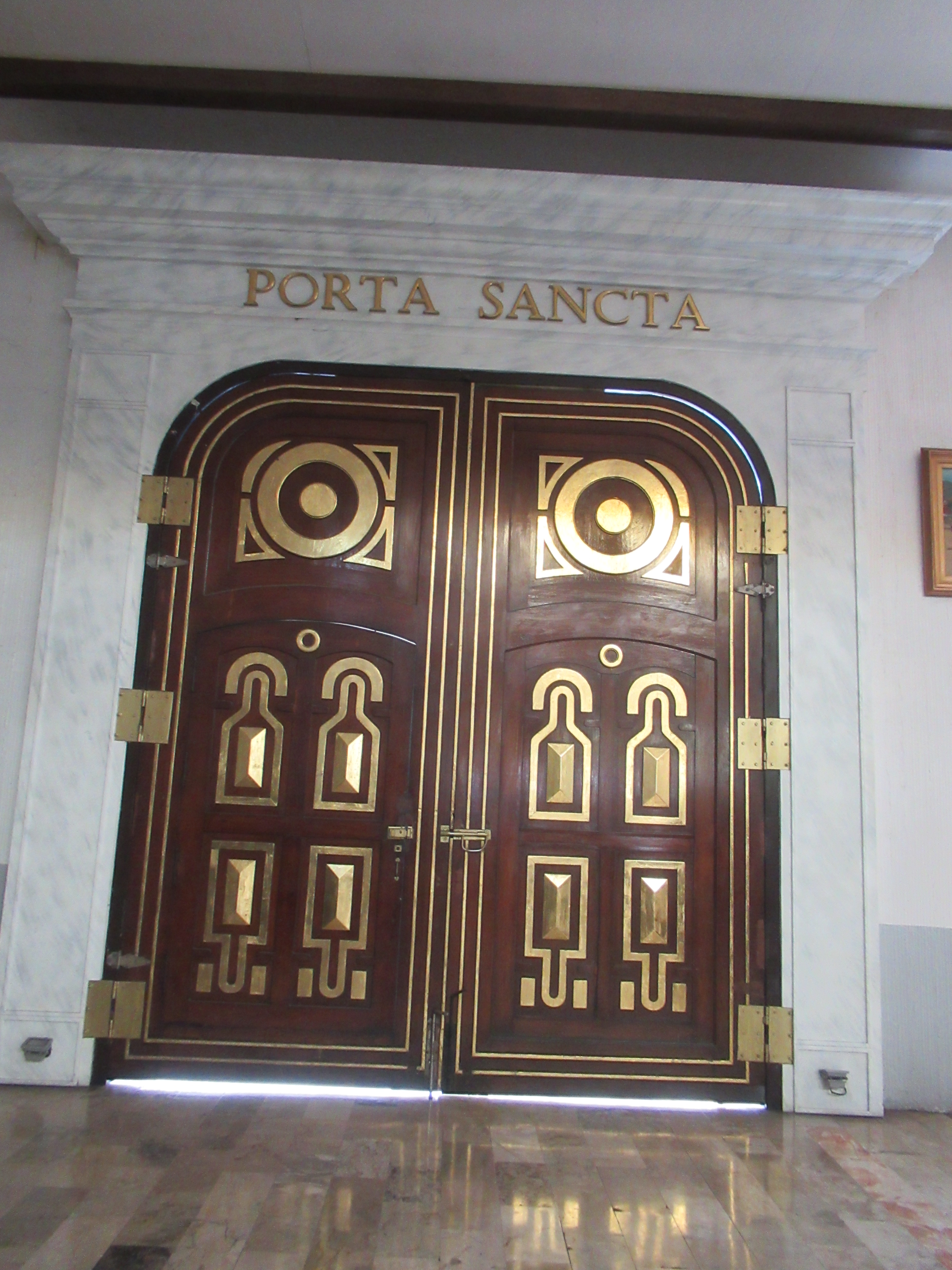
Porta sancta

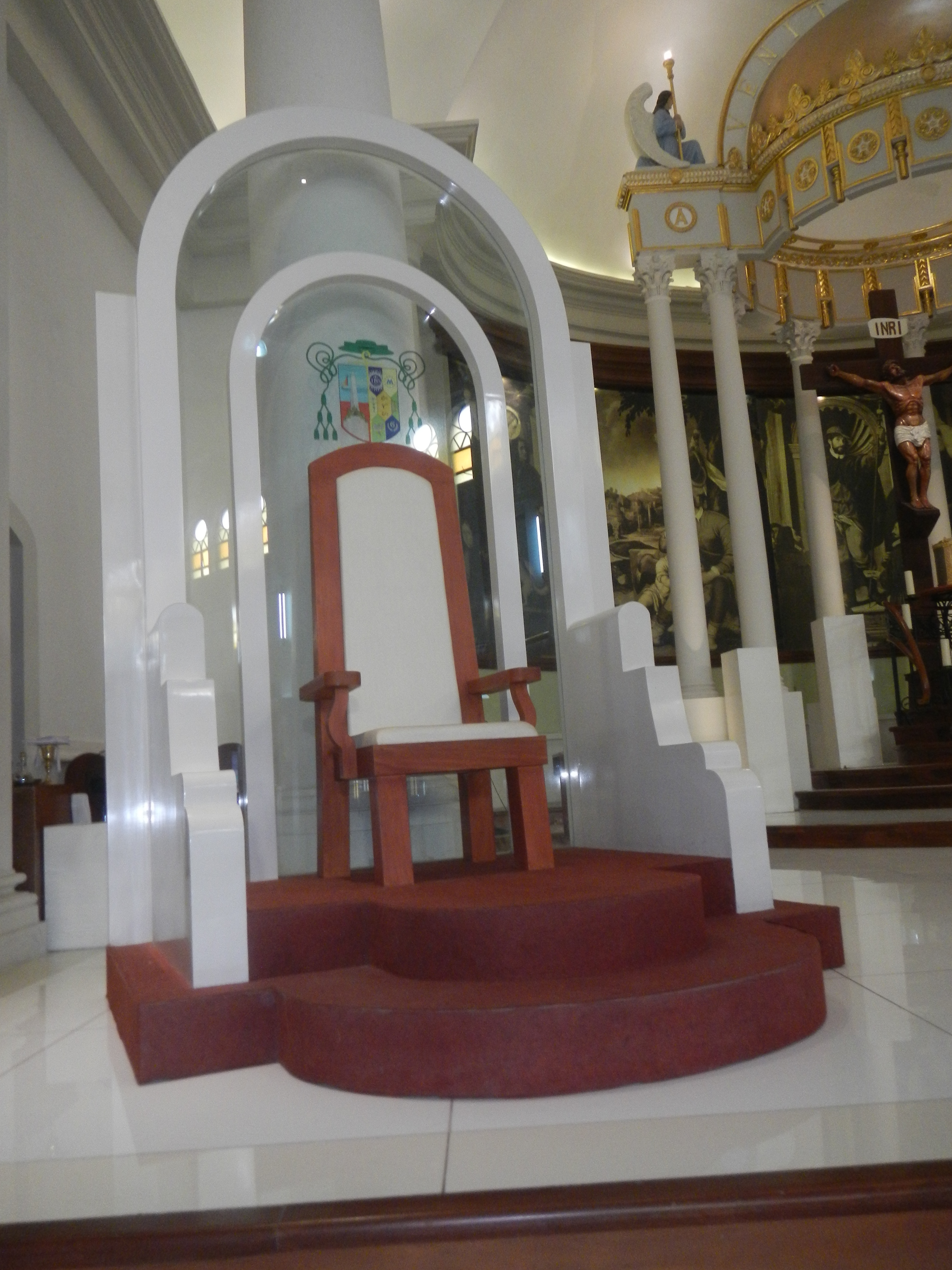
Cathedra

== See also ==
- San Roque Cathedral Ministry of Altar Servers
