= 10th Avenue (Caloocan) =

Street in Caloocan, Metro Manila, Philippines

Coordinates: 14°39′3″N 120°59′21″E

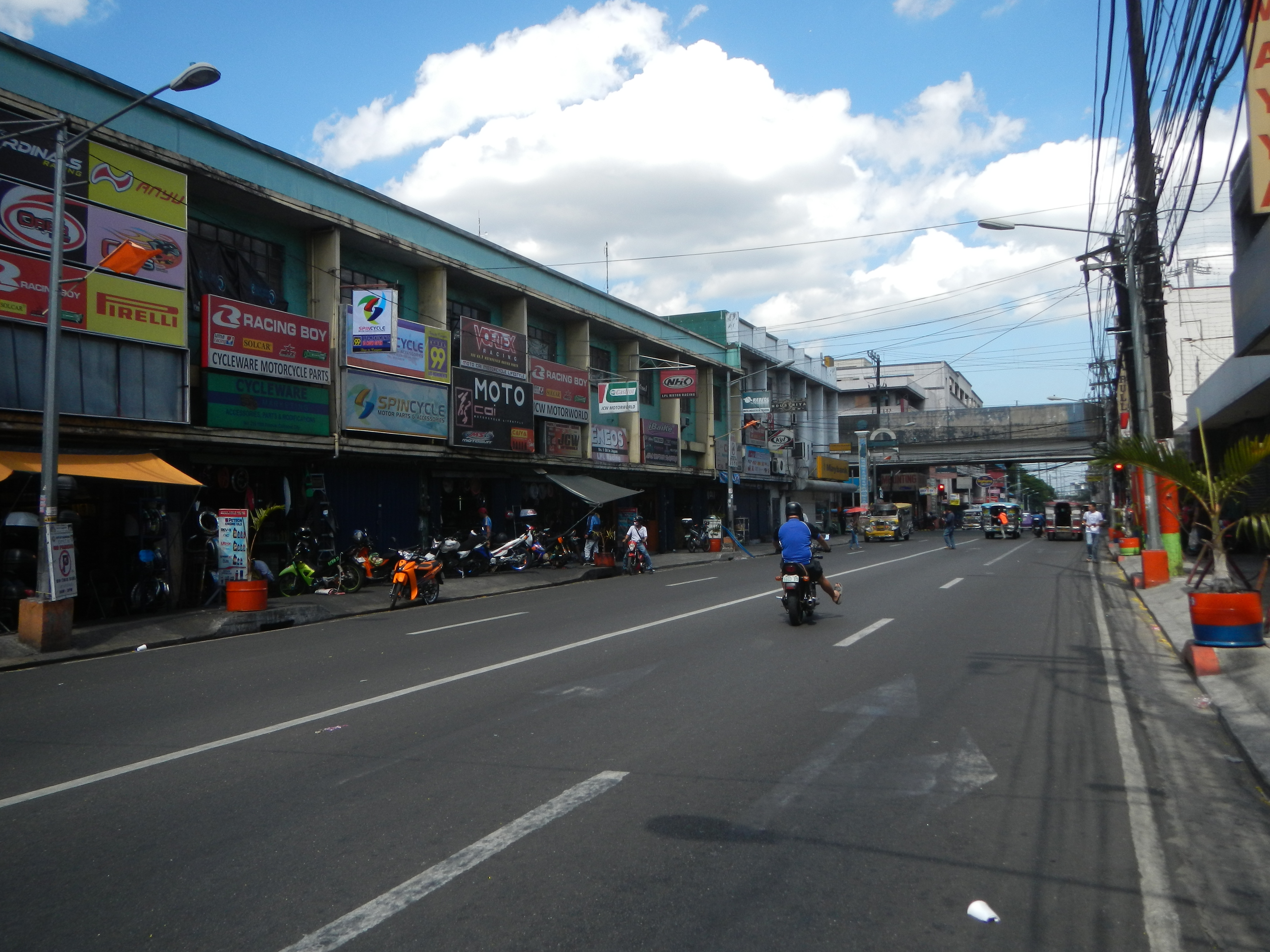
- 10th Avenue near Rizal Avenue with the elevated LRT-1 visible in the background
- Interactive map of 10th Avenue
- Former name(s): Macario Asistio Sr. Avenue; Asistio Avenue
- Maintained by: Department of Public Works and Highways – Metro Manila 3rd District Engineering Office
- Length: 2.418 km (1.502 mi)
- Location: Caloocan
- West end: A. Mabini Street in Poblacion
- Major junctions: N150 (Rizal Avenue)
- East end: Kamantigue Street in Grace Park East

10th Avenue, formerly known as Macario Asistio Sr. Avenue or simply Asistio Avenue, is an undivided four-lane street in Caloocan, Metro Manila, Philippines that stretches east–west, bisecting south Caloocan. Like most avenues in the Grace Park area, it crosses a grid system of numbered streets that run from north to south, with other numbered avenues running from east to west. 10th Avenue was formally renamed "Asistio Avenue" before the reversion of its current name, owing to it being the tenth avenue running east–west from the city's border with Manila in the south. The former renaming was done in 1984 to honor the former mayor of Caloocan, who served from 1962 to 1971, and the father of another Caloocan mayor, Boy Asistio, but has since been disregarded and reverted.

10th Avenue and the present-day Grace Park district, through which it travels, was a pre–World War II civilian airfield known as the Manila North Airfield or Grace Park. This airfield, which opened in 1935 near the then-newly built Bonifacio Monument, was Manila's first commercial airport that served as a hub for Philippine Airlines for its first domestic routes. The airport was decommissioned after the war and was transformed by the government into a residential and industrial area. Manila Airport was transferred to the present site Nichols Field in Paranaque and Pasay in 1948 (now known as Ninoy Aquino International Airport and Villamor Air Base) due to the flatter terrain, expanse of greenfield land, and the existing USAF base runway (Runway 13/31), which could be used for the airport (and later in 1954, the longer international runway (Runway 06/24) and associated taxiways were added and inaugurated in 1961).

== Route description ==
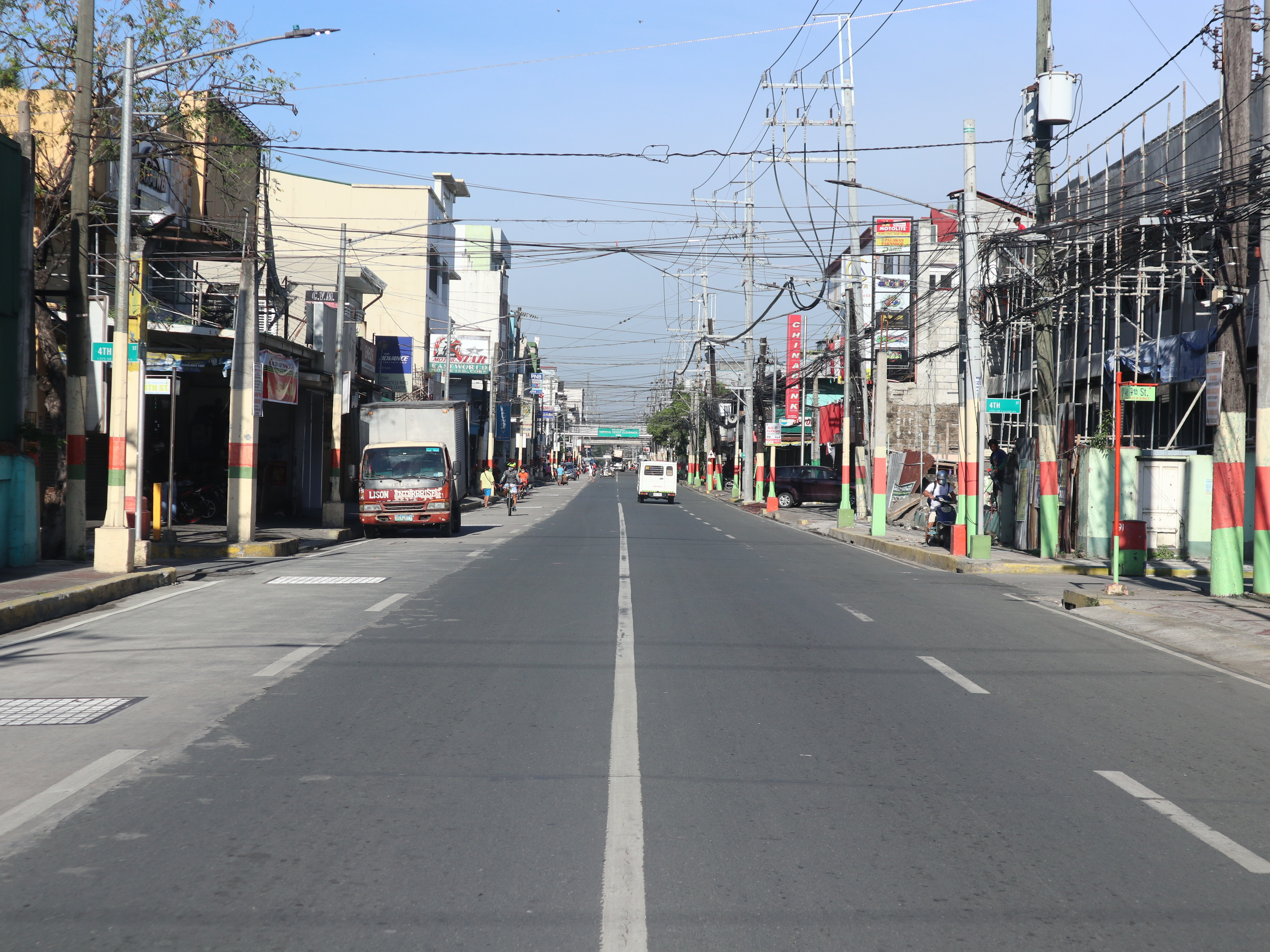
10th Avenue in Grace Park East

10th Avenue is a national road classified by the Department of Public Works and Highways as a tertiary road. The road runs for 2.418 kilometers (1.502 mi) from its western terminus at the intersection of A. Mabini Street in Poblacion to its eastern terminus at Kamantigue Street in Barrio Galino, close to A. Bonifacio Avenue at the city's border with Barangays Balingasa and Pag-Ibig sa Nayon in Quezon City.

The avenue is divided into two segments by Rizal Avenue, which also serves as the dividing line between Grace Park West and Grace Park East. At its western segment, 10th Avenue begins at the intersection of A. Mabini Street in Poblacion, the old city center of Caloocan. It crosses the Philippine National Railways tracks, the 10th Avenue railway station, and the elevated NLEX Harbor Link in Barangay 64. It curves slightly to the north before the intersection with Vibora Street and straightens out as it crosses several streets towards Rizal Avenue. Landmarks along this segment include COMELEC Caloocan, the Caloocan Public Library, Caloocan High School and Caloocan City Science High School. East of Rizal Avenue, it runs in an almost perfectly straight line to its other terminus in Grace Park East. Located along this segment is the Caloocan campus of Systems Plus College Foundation. The New Caloocan City Hall is accessible via 8th (A. de Jesus) and 9th Streets, a full block south of 10th Avenue.

At its west end, the avenue continues as Padre Burgos Street through Caloocan's poblacion and Dagat-Dagatan districts, providing access to the Caloocan Judicial Complex, Caloocan Poblacion Market, Caloocan Central Elementary School, and the Caloocan Cathedral.
