= Claternae =

Roman town on the Via Emilia

Coordinates: 44.4344°N 11.5045°E

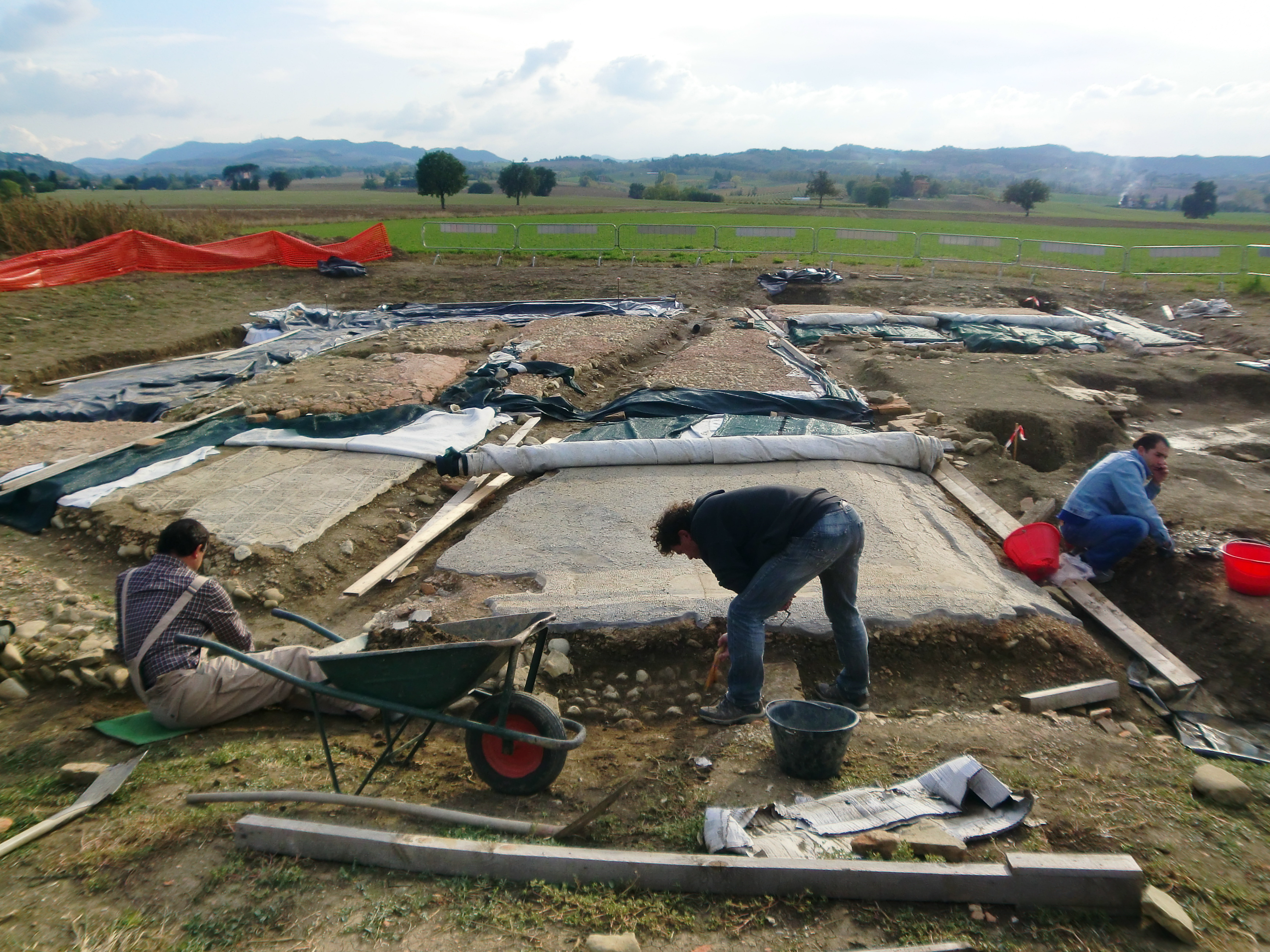
Excavating a Roman villa with mosaic flooring at Claternae

Claternae, also called Claterna, was a Roman town on the Via Emilia situated between the coloniae of Bononia and Forum Cornelii. Like many other evenly spaced settlements on the Via Emilia, each at a day's march for the legionaries, it probably arose as a stopping place for travellers between the major towns.

== History ==
The beginning of Roman colonization of Gallia Cisalpina and the building of the Via Emilia perhaps along a pre-existing trail, Claternae was founded at the junction between the Via Emilia and another road, perhaps the Via Flaminia Minor, which crossed the Apennines to provide a link with Arezzo.

Accordingly, the town, of medium size for that period, arose in the early 2nd century BC, officially in 187 BC. It disappeared not long after the 4th-century AD fall of the Western Roman Empire.

== Bishopric ==
Lanzoni argues that, like other towns in the region which were of no greater importance, Claternae was the seat of a diocese, to which he attributes a bishop named Constantius, whom Saint Ambrose, as metropolitan archbishop, directed to make frequent visits to the nearby diocese of Forum Cornelii, which was then without a bishop. No longer a residential bishopric, Claternae is today listed by the Catholic Church as a titular see.

== Present situation ==
The remains of Claternae lie within the comune of Ozzano dell'Emilia at the hamlet of Maggio and close to the Quaderna stream, which gave the name to the town. An excavated domus with mosaic pavements on the south side of the Via Emilia, and a reconstructed workman's dwelling on the other side are on display. The other remains have been covered up again awaiting funds for their definitive arrangement.

== See also ==
- Catholic Church in Italy
