= Alamid (band) =

Filipino rock band

- Also known as: The Philippines' Friendliest Rock Band
- Origin: Malabon, Philippines
- Genres: Pinoy rock
- Years active: 1989–present
- Labels: Twisted Red Cross (1989–1990); Warner Music Philippines (1993–2001); Independent (2001–present)
- Members: Dexter Facelo; Jas Arandela; Thalie Facelo; Zach Alcasid
- Past members: Gary Ignacio; Efryl de Dios; JD Sto. Tomas; Perry Jocson; Jet Broas; Jex Herradura; Gene Mitra; Gail Ignacio; Jun Pineda; Carl McFly

Alamid is a Filipino rock band from Manila.

== History ==
The two main members Gary Ignacio and Dexter Facelo met while attending the St. James Academy in Malabon. In 1993, they signed to Warner Music Philippines and released three albums.

On November 4, 1994, the band along with Razorback opened for the American rock supergroup Mr. Big at their concert at the Folk Arts Theater.

Their hit single "Your Love" was named Song of the Year at the NU107 Rock Awards in 1994. In 2006, it was covered by Erik Santos generating renewed interest in the band, although Ignacio and Facelo constituted the band at that time. They were managed by Dodong Viray until his demise. They had further success with the songs "Just Wasn't Brave Enough" and "Still Believe in Love" while the intro to "China Eyes" was used for the ABS-CBN sitcom Palibhasa Lalake.

In 1995, the song "Batibot" was used as a theme song for the children's show of the same name. They collaborated with rapper Francis Magalona on the song "1896".

The band continue to play live both in the Philippines and abroad.

On April 17, 2015, former frontman Gary Ignacio died due to multiple organ failure.

== Band members ==
=== Current members ===
- Dexter Facelo - guitar, vocals
- Jas Arandela - keyboards, vocals
- Thalie Facelo - bass, vocals
- Zach Alcasid - drums, vocals

=== Former members ===
- Gary Ignacio (deceased)
- Efryl De Dios
- Jay Dominic Sto. Tomas
- Perry Jocson
- Jet Broas
- Gail Ignacio
- Jun Pineda
- Jex Herradura
- Gene Mitra
- Carl McFly

== Discography ==
=== Albums ===
- Alamid (Warner Philippines, 1994)
- Panaginip (Warner, 1995)
- Radio Friendly (Warner, 1997)
- Anting-anting (independently released, 2005)

=== Compilation albums ===
- 1896 (Ang Pagsilang) (Sony Music Philippines, 1996)
- The Best of Alamid (Warner, 2001)
- Servant of All 2: In His Time (Viva Records, 2002)
- Superbands (Universal Records Philippines, 2006)
- Rock Grooves in Delirious Ways (Sony Music Philippines, 2007)

== Awards ==
| Year | Award giving body | Category | Nominated work | Results |
|---|---|---|---|---|
| 1994 | NU Rock Awards | Song of the Year | "Your Love" | Won |

Awards
| Preceded by New award | NU Rock Awards; Song of the Year "Your Love"; 1994 | Succeeded by "Laklak"; Teeth |
