= Caloocan High School =

- Mataas na Paaralan ng Caloocan
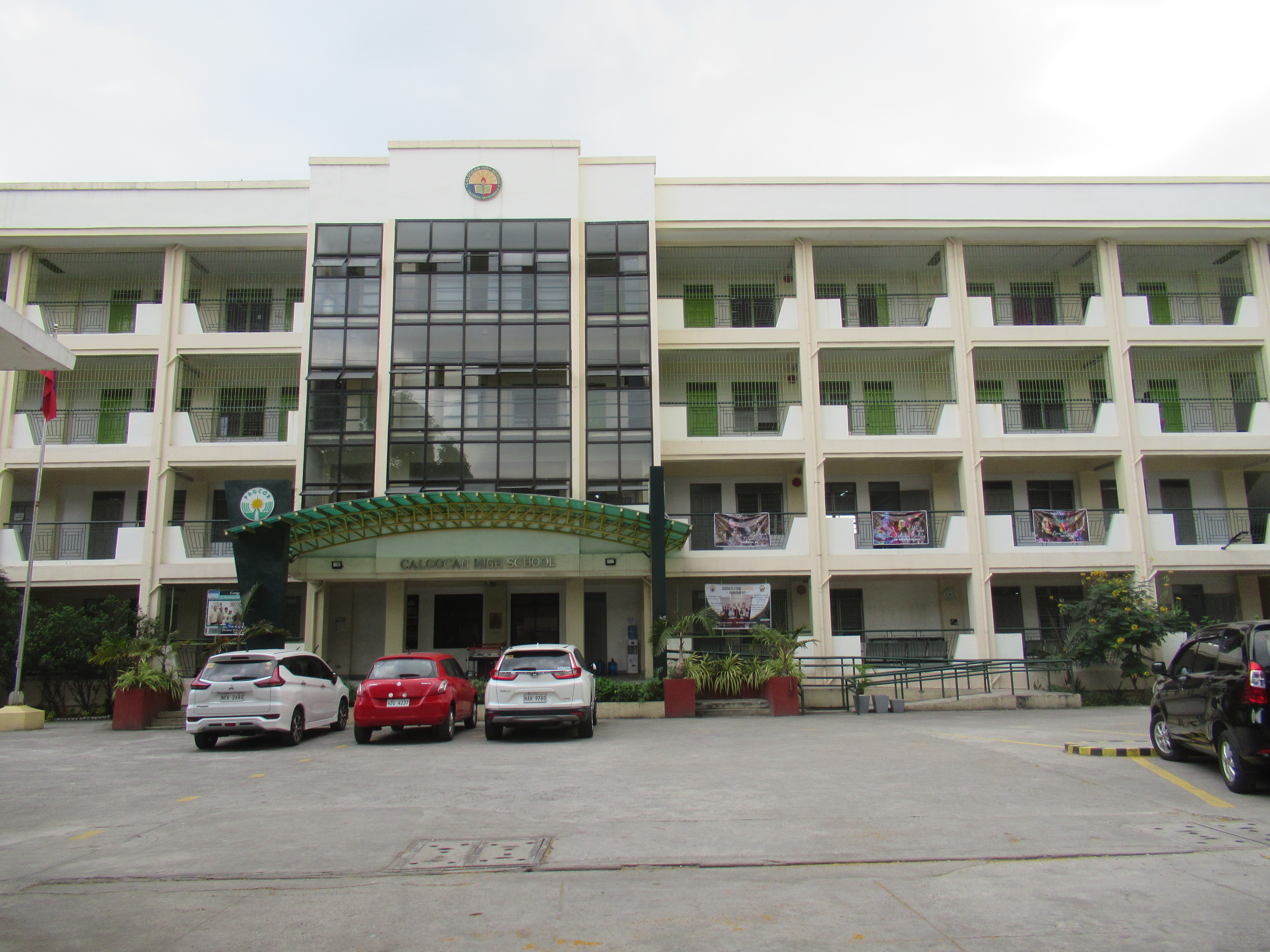
- Main building of CHS in 2023

Location
- 10th Avenue; Caloocan, Metro Manila; Philippines
- Coordinates: 14°39′05.6″N 120°58′55.4″E

Information
- Type: Public High School
- Established: March 22, 1941
- School code: 305388
- Principal: Ferazim R. Dannug
- Grades: 7 to 12
- Language: English, Filipino
- Campus: Urban
- Colors: Green Yellow Red and Blue
- Nickname: Calhighians
- Publication: The Voice (English), Ang Tinig (Filipino)
- Website: caloocanhighschool.wordpress.com

Caloocan High School (Filipino: Mataas na Paaralan ng Caloocan) abbreviated to CHS also known as CalHigh or Kalhay, is a secondary school in Caloocan, Philippines. It was the largest secondary school in Caloocan, and was established on March 22, 1941. It is bordered by 10th Avenue at the north, Del Mundo Street on the east, 9th Avenue on the south, and P. Sevilla Street on the west.

== History ==
In the Grace Park district of Caloocan, a 2.7-acre (1.1 ha) school site was established on rice fields in 1940. The Gabaldon-style building, which had 6 regular classrooms and 2 smaller rooms for offices, was finished on December 6, 1944, and was prepared for occupancy the following Monday, December 8. The Japanese bombing of Pearl Harbor prevented this.

By June 1947, the Cecilio Apostol Elementary School could not accommodate the growing number of high school students. Caloocan High School needed to have its own building. In March 1951, the Vocational building was the location for the commencement ceremony. In June, Caloocan High School's superintendent, Abdon Javier, decided to move there from the buildings in ninth.

Such an improvement under the leadership of Rizal Governor Isidro Rodriguez could be seen not just in the town but also in other schools in the province of Rizal, despite taking the chance that enrollment would decline. Since Caloocan's conversion to a city in 1962, Caloocan High School has grown. In 1967–1968, the school added to two annexes, Andres Bonifacio High School and Toribio Teodoro Memorial High School.

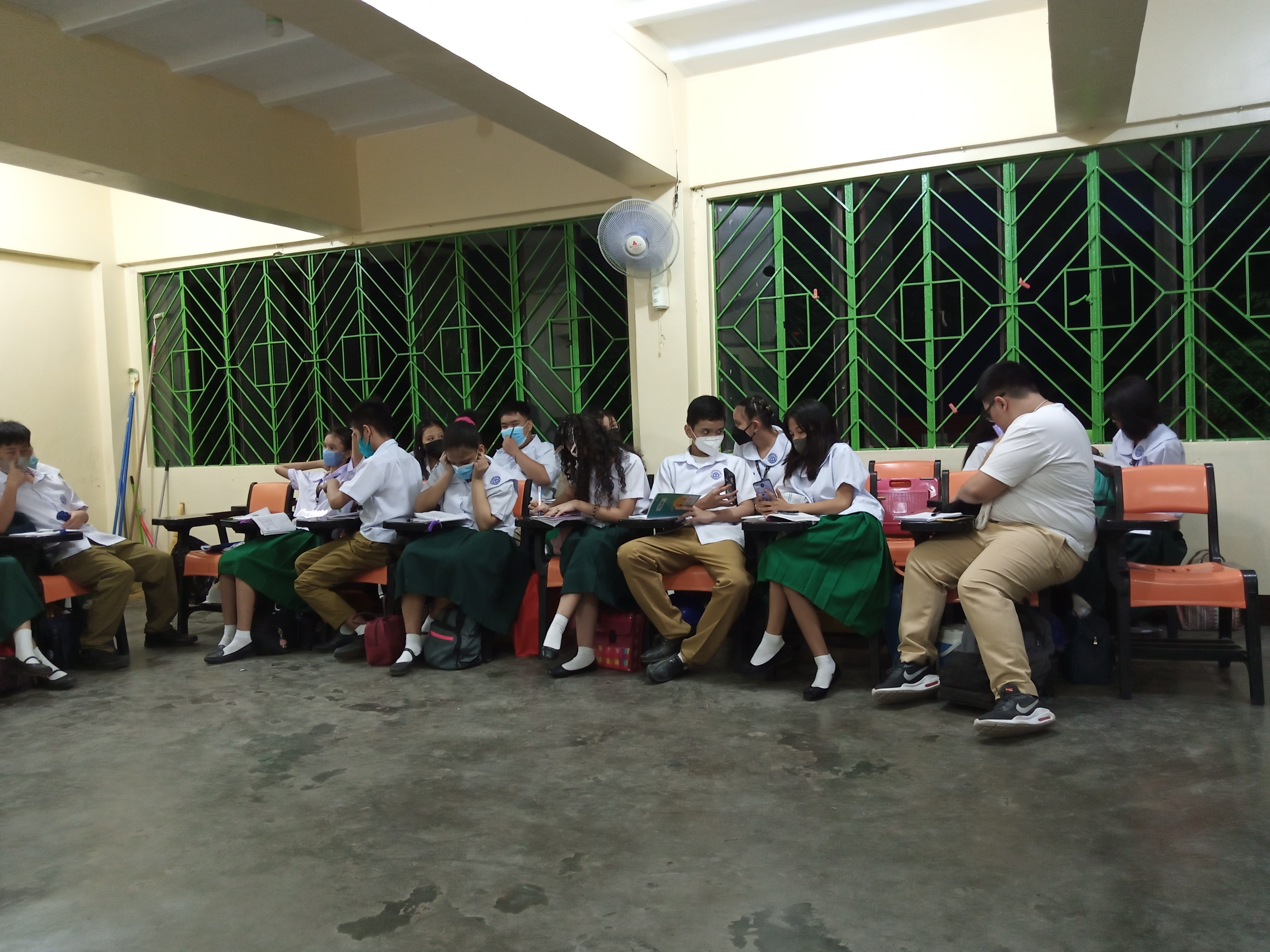
CHS students in the classroom.

In 1982, the old buildings in Caloocan High School were demolished to make way for an administration building.120 classrooms are presently housed in these structures. English, Filipino, Social Studies, Science, Mathematics, Practical Arts, Home Economics, YD-CAT, and Values Education are among the nine subject areas taught at Caloocan High School, which has a teaching staff of 401. Toribio Teodoro High School, Cecilio Apostol High School, Integrated School for first year, Maria Clara and Tandang Sora annexes were also integrated with Caloocan High School between 1982 and 1983. Each Department is led by a department head or coordinator who oversees and controls the department's operations while also teaching in the department.

The school offers Grade 7 to 12 Junior and Senior High School with Special Programs in Science, Technology and Engineering (STE), Special Education Program (SPED), Open High School Program (OHSP) and Alternative Learning System (ALS).
