= San Bartolome Church (Malabon) =

Roman Catholic church in Malabon, Philippines

Malabon Church
- San Bartolome Parish Church
- Iglesia y Basilica Minore de San Bartolome de Malabon (Spanish); Simbahan at Basilika Menor ng San Bartolome ng Malabon (Filipino)
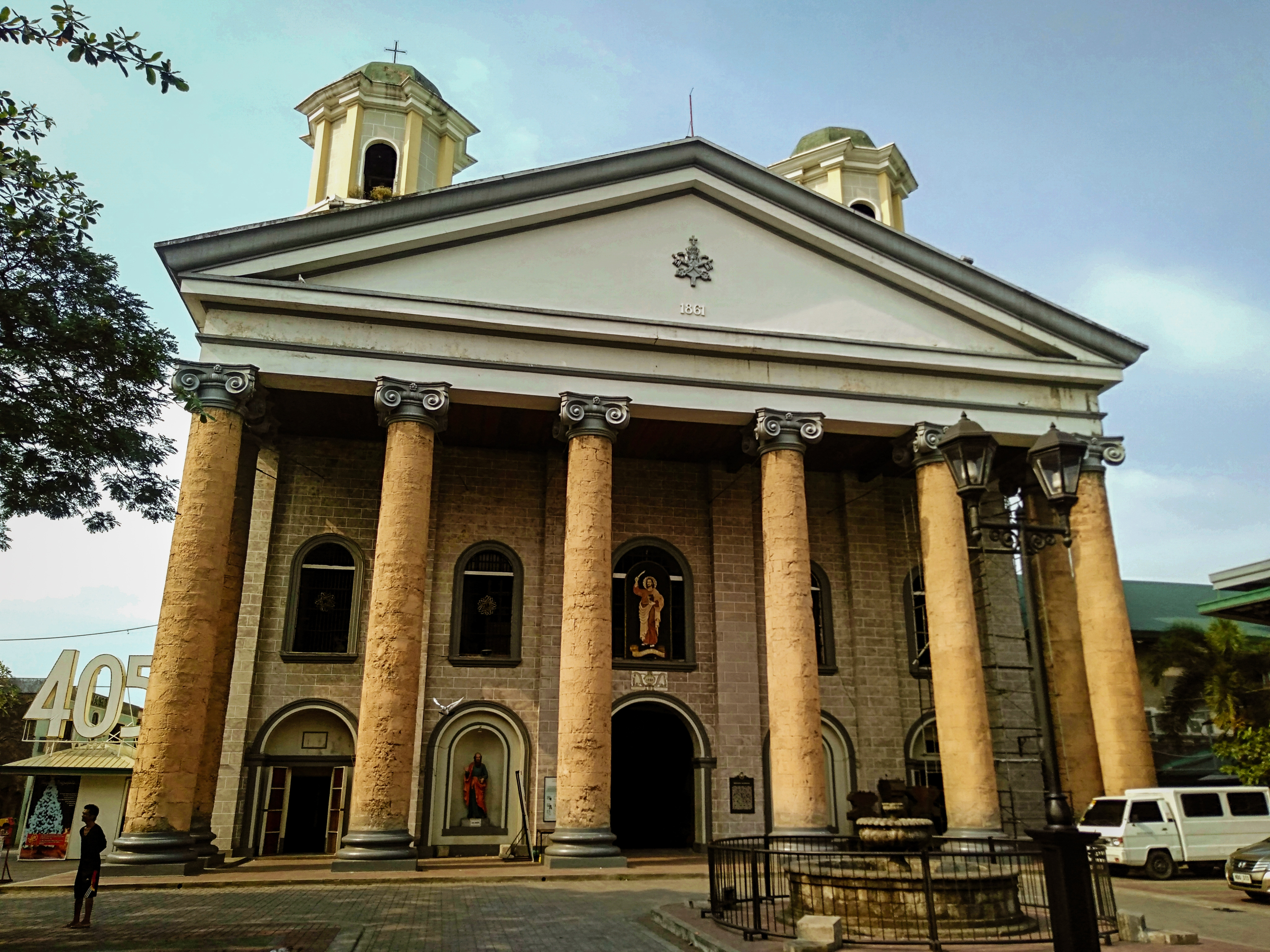
- Church facade in 2020

- Location in Metro Manila Location in Luzon Location in the Philippines
- 14°39′32″N 120°57′05″E
- Location: Malabon, Metro Manila
- Country: Philippines
- Denomination: Roman Catholic

History
- Status: Minor Basilica
- Founded: May 21, 1599; 427 years ago
- Dedication: St. Bartholomew the Apostle
- Dedicated: May 10, 2014; 12 years ago
- Earlier dedication: May 17, 1614; 412 years ago

Architecture
- Functional status: Active
- Heritage designation: Important Cultural Property
- Designated: August 11, 2022
- Architectural type: Church building
- Style: Neoclassical

Specifications
- Length: 70.14 meters (230.1 ft)
- Width: 25.05 meters (82.2 ft)

Administration
- Province: Manila
- Diocese: Kalookan

Clergy
- Rector: Jeronimo Ma. J. Cruz
- Vicar(s): Rey Larius Dimayacyac V Angelo A. Ajero

Minor Basilica and Parish of San Bartolome, also known as San Bartolome Parish Church or commonly known as Malabon Church, is a minor basilica of the Roman Catholic Church in Malabon. The church's titular is Malabon's patron saint, Saint Bartholomew the Apostle whose feast day falls on every 24th day of August. It is under the jurisdiction of the Diocese of Kalookan. The National Museum of the Philippines designated the church an Important Cultural Property on August 11, 2022. The Vatican elevated the church to the status of Minor Basilica on September 29, 2026.

== History ==
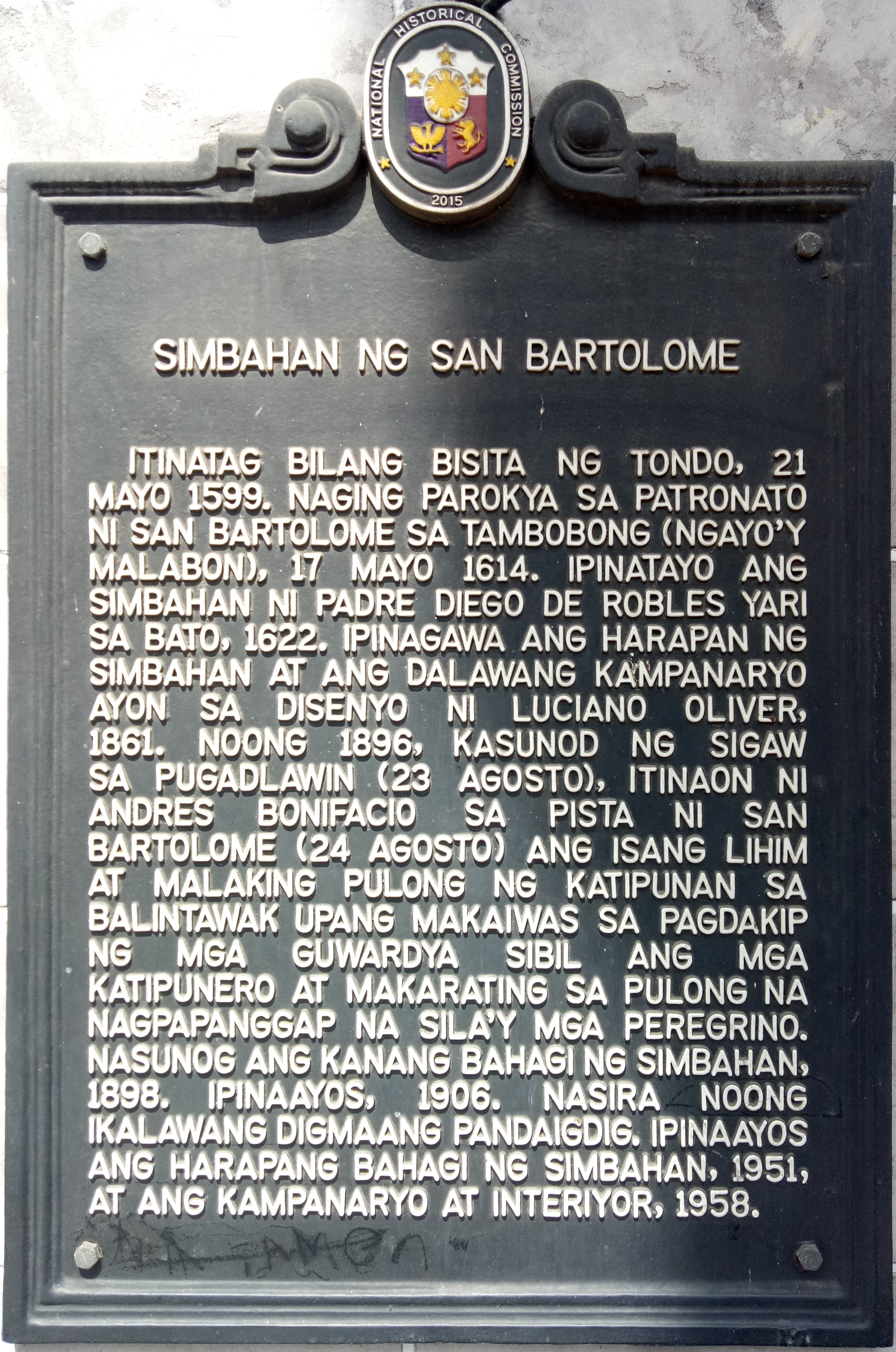
Church NHC historical marker installed in 2015

A former visita of Tondo, Malabon was founded on May 21, 1599. On May 17, 1614, it became an independent parish, with Padre Luis Gutierrez as vicar prior. When Padre Diego de Robles became prior of Malabon in 1621, he began the construction of the first stone church a year after. A more durable structure was completed in 1813.

The construction was gradual as additions were made by succeeding priests. The transept was added in 1835 under Padre Francisco Valencia. The two lateral aisles together with the media naranja dome were added when Padre Raimundo Cueto assumed the post of minister of Malabon in 1854. This was done in collaboration with architects Vina and Urquiza. In 1861, construction of the Parthenon-like facade and the twin towers began under the direction of Luciano Oliver and supervision of parish priest Padre Martin Ruiz.

Following the Cry of Pugad Lawin, Andrés Bonifacio assembled Katipunan military headquarters in the church on the feast day of its patron saint. It was established to organize the Katipunan's forces in preparation for the uprising against Spanish colonial rule. The church suffered extensive damage from a fire in which the eastern portion of the structure and many valuables were stolen or destroyed; five altars and a removable silver altar remained intact during the Philippine Revolution in 1898. It was restored in 1906.

During World War II, San Bartolome Church suffered heavy damages and restoration began only in 1951 under the secular priest Father Trinidad. In 1958, Father Reyes took on the task of repairing the dome, transept, main altar, and the belfry.

San Bartolome Church now has seven bells, two of which are dedicated to Santa Rita and one to San Bartolome. One bell has Father Guillermo Diaz's name inscribed on it. Father Diaz, OSA, was minister of Tambobong from 1881 to 1885.

In celebration of the church's 400th anniversary, the church was rededicated on May 10, 2014. The Philippine Postal Corporation issued a limited edition stamp designed by Victorino Serevo. The stamp measures 80mm by 30mm and bears the image of St. Bartholome alongside the old Malabon Church.

On August 11, 2022, the National Museum of the Philippines was declared the church as an Important Cultural Property (ICP). On October 29, 2026, the Diocese of Kalookan announced that the Vatican had been elevated the church into a minor basilica and received formal decree of approval from the Dicastery for Divine Worship and the Discipline of the Sacraments on September 29, 2026. The decree granted the diocese’s petition, which was endorsed by the Catholic Bishops' Conference of the Philippines.

== Architecture ==
San Bartolome Church's protruding triangular pediment, supported by the colonnade of the facade, bears the Augustinian symbol and the year 1861. The facade features eight imposing Ionic columns reminiscent of a Greco-Roman temple. Measuring 70.14 meters (230.1 ft) by 25.05 meters (82.2 ft), the church has a central nave and two aisles, transept, and a dome in the media naranja or barrel vault style which is cupped by a campanile.

The main entrance to the church is a Jubilee door decorated with wood carvings. Numerous paintings framed with gold leaf line the church ceiling.

An elegant retablo can be found in the sanctuary where the image of Saint Bartholomew the Apostle is surrounded by the image of the Blessed Virgin Mary above, the tabernacle below, and St. Augustine and St. Nicholas de Tolentine on both sides.

The writer I.V. Mallari, a native of Malabon, writes that the church is "one of the most beautiful examples of ecclesiastical architecture that Spain has left this country."'

== Gallery ==
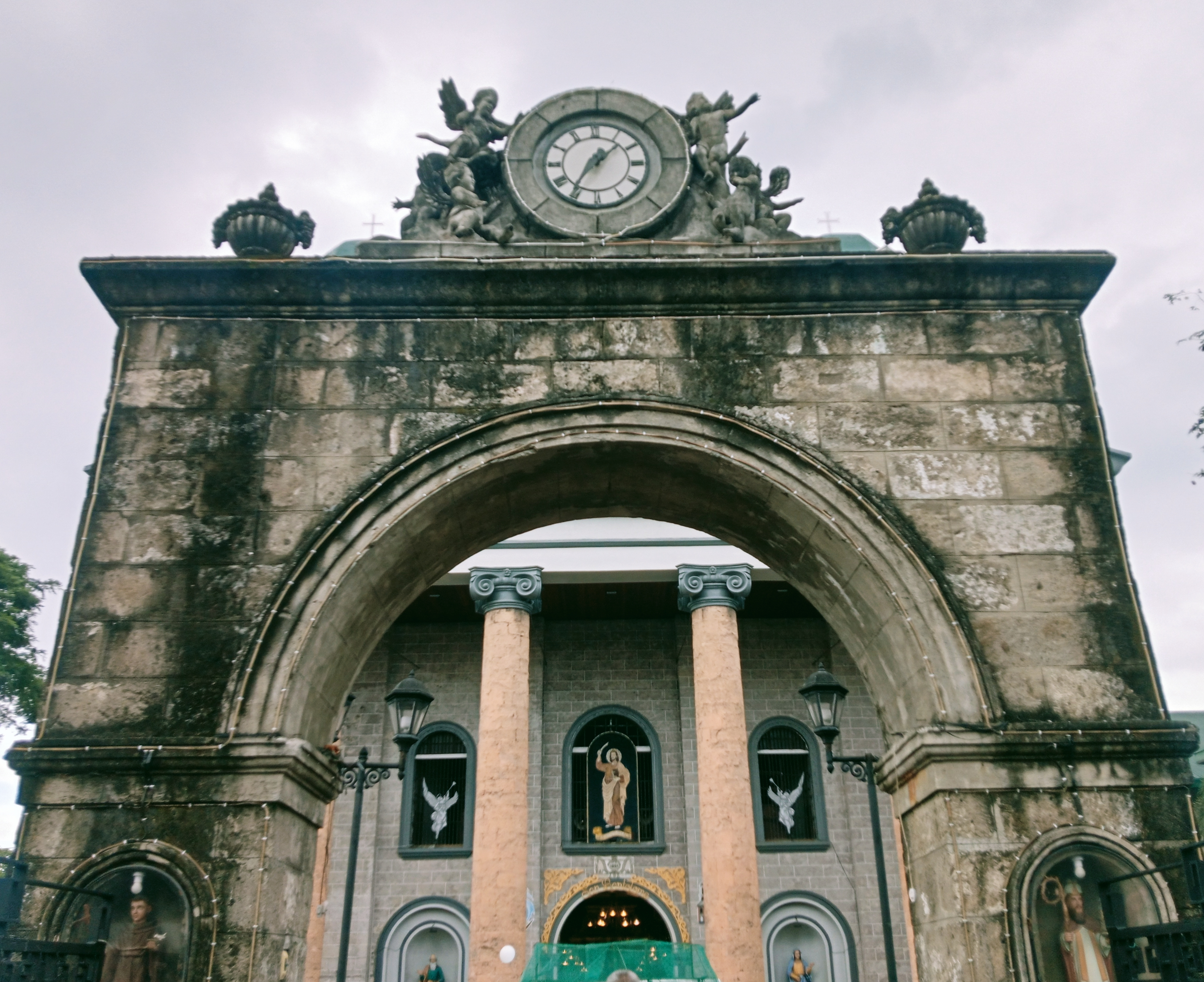
Welcome arch

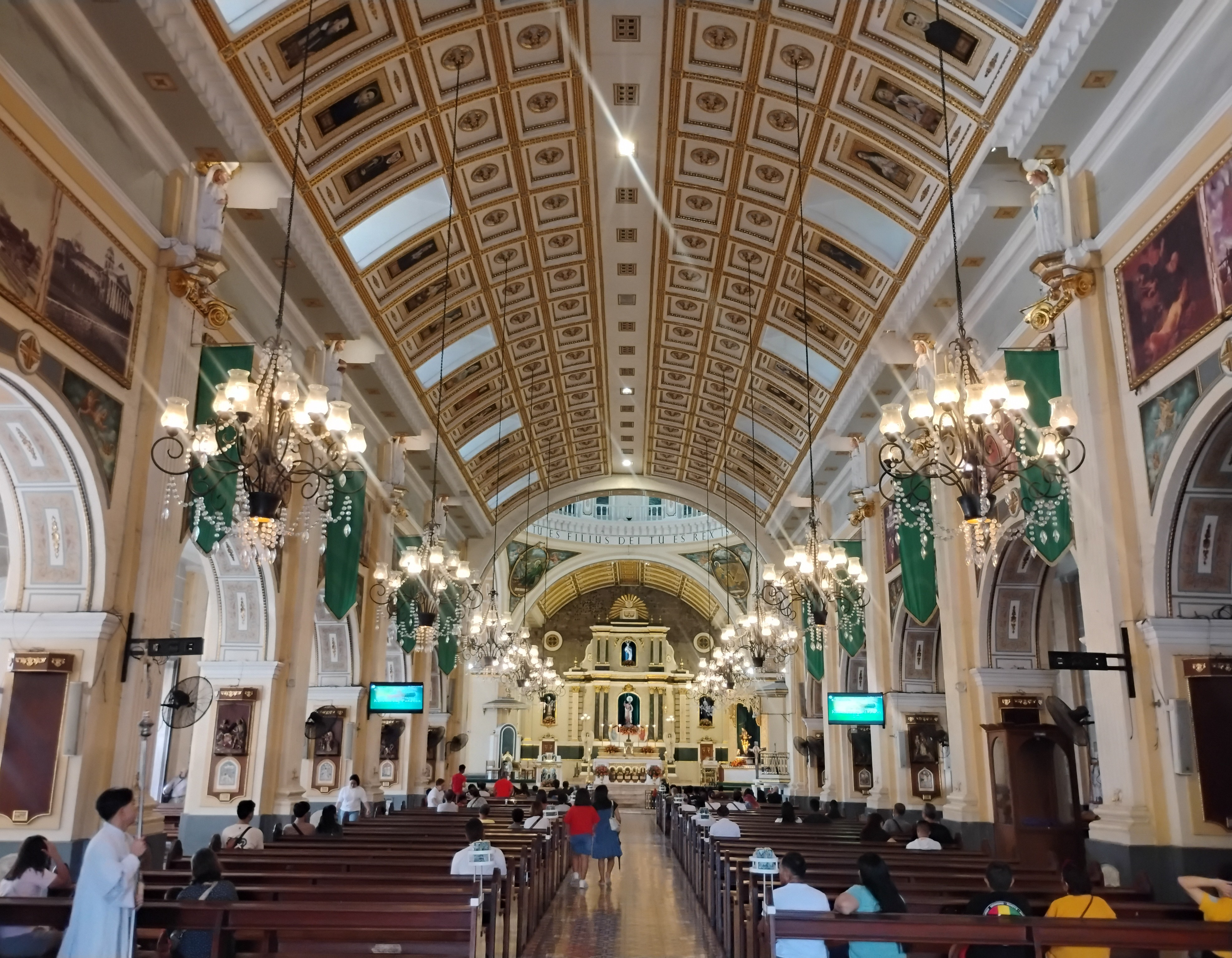
Nave facing the altar in 2025

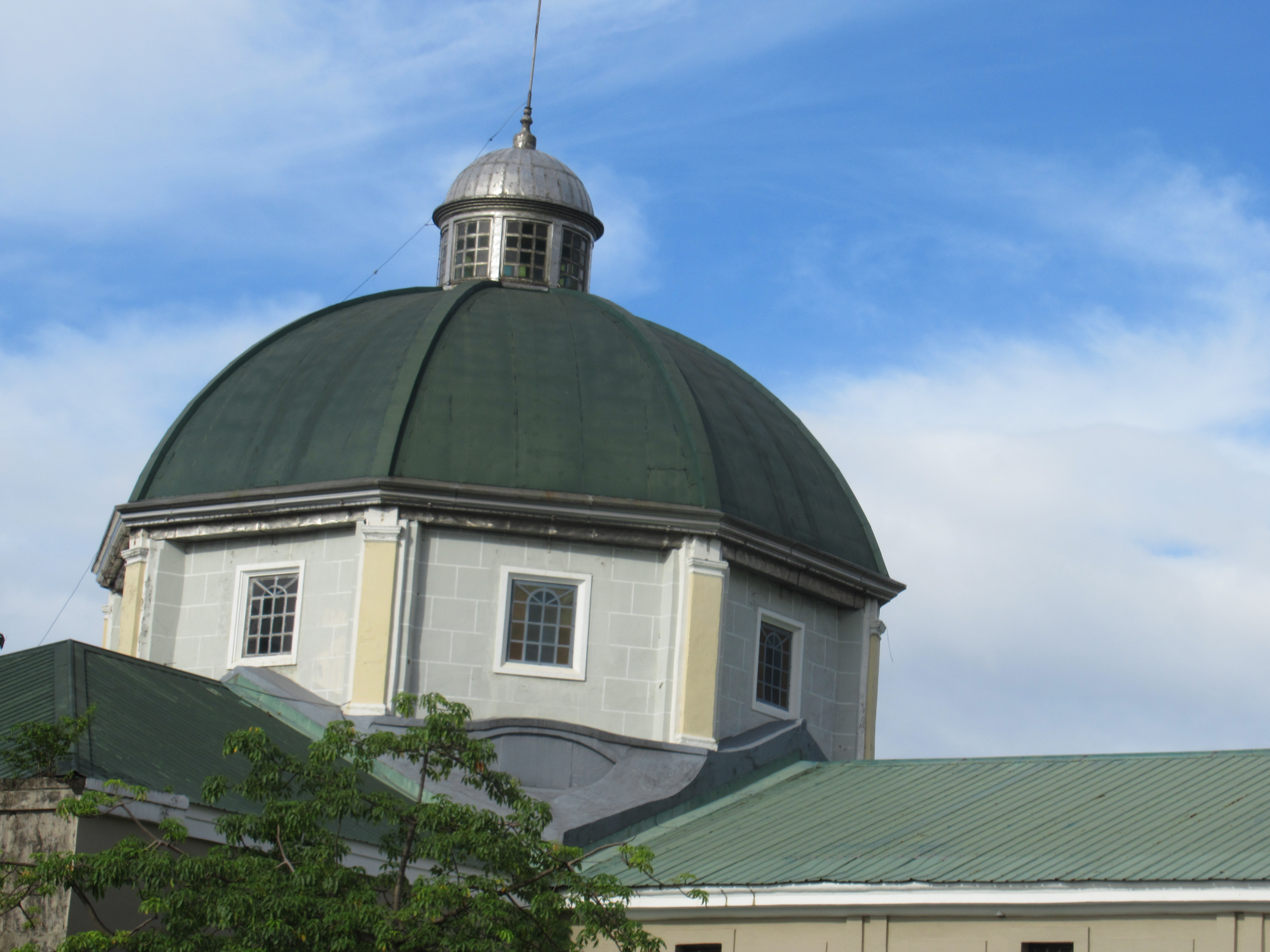
Church dome

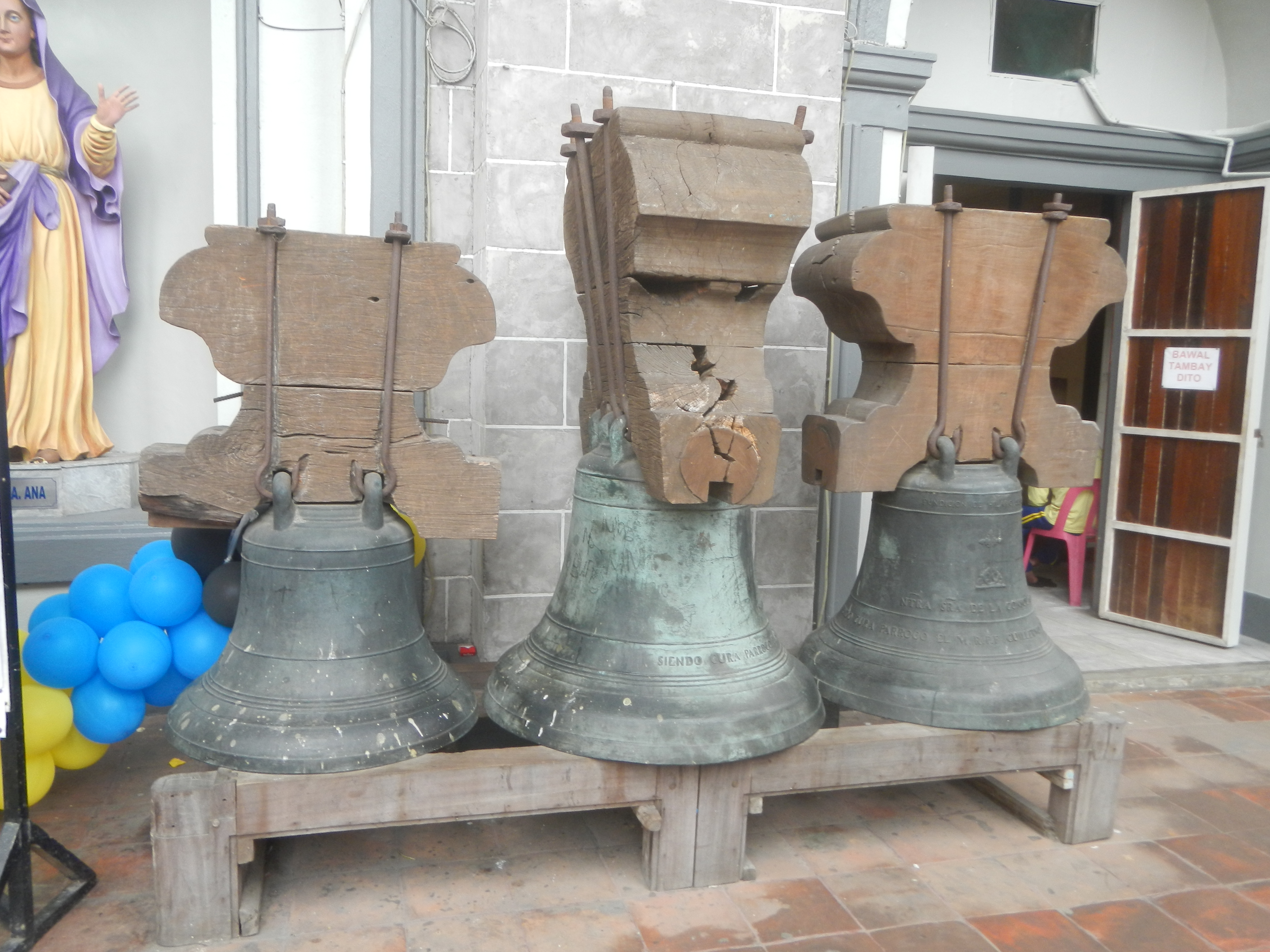
Three bells of the church
