= Diocese of Kalookan =

Latin Catholic diocese in the Philippines

Diocese of Kalookan Dioecesis Kalookana Diyosesis ng Kalookan Diócesis de Caloocan

Catholic
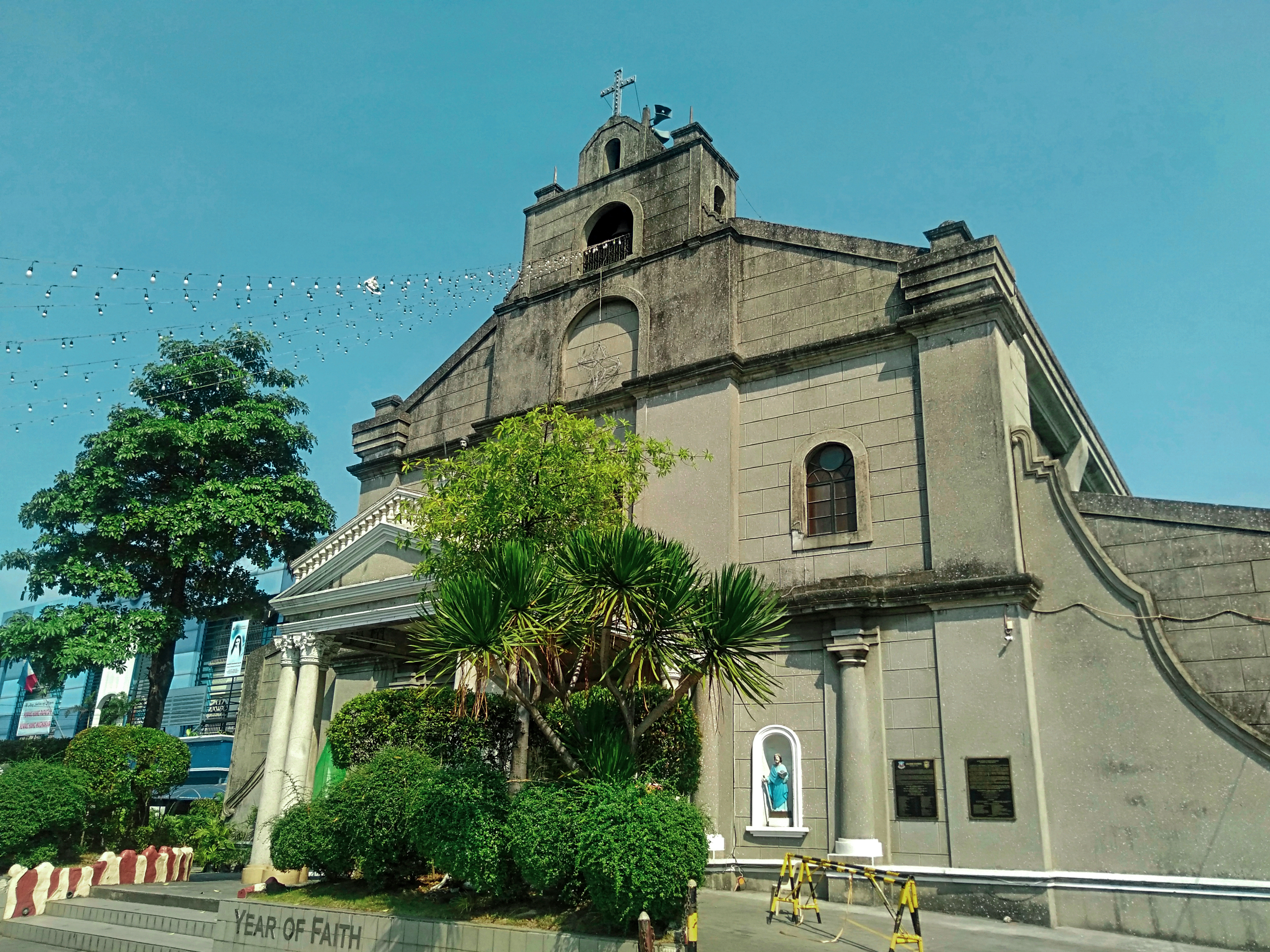
- San Roque Cathedral

- Coat of arms

Location
- Country: Philippines
- Territory: South Caloocan (except Barangay 164); Malabon; Navotas
- Ecclesiastical province: Manila
- Metropolitan: Manila
- Coordinates: 14°35′9″N 120°58′22″E

Statistics
- Area: 45 km^{2} (17 sq mi)
- Population: Total; Catholics: (as of 2021); 1,330,840; 1,184,000 (89.0%)
- Parishes: 31 (29 parishes, 2 quasi-parishes)

Information
- Denomination: Catholic Church
- Sui iuris church: Latin Church
- Rite: Roman Rite
- Established: June 28, 2003; 23 years ago
- Cathedral: San Roque Cathedral
- Patron saint: Saint Roch
- Secular priests: 71 (37 diocesan and 34 religious)

Current leadership
- Pope: Leo XIV
- Bishop: Pablo Virgilio David
- Metropolitan Archbishop: Jose Advincula
- Vicar General: Jeronimo Ma. J. Cruz
- Bishops emeritus: Deogracias S. Iñiguez Jr.

Website
- Diocese of Kalookan
- Statistics as of 2021 from Catholic-Hierarchy.org

The Diocese of Kalookan (Latin: Dioecesis Kalookana; Filipino: Diyosesis ng Kalookan) is a Latin Church diocese of the Catholic Church in Metro Manila, Philippines. It is a suffragan diocese of the Archdiocese of Manila and covers South Caloocan, Malabon, and Navotas.

== History ==
Pope John Paul II created the diocese on June 28, 2003, through the apostolic constitution Kalookana. The new diocese was formed from South Caloocan, Malabon, and Navotas, which had previously been part of the Archdiocese of Manila. The parish church of Saint Roch was designated as its cathedral, and Kalookan became a suffragan diocese of Manila.

Deogracias S. Iñiguez Jr., the diocese's first bishop, formally took canonical possession of the see at San Roque Cathedral on August 22, 2003.

Pope Benedict XVI accepted Iñiguez's resignation on January 25, 2013. During the vacancy that followed, Auxiliary Bishop Francisco Mendoza de Leon of Antipolo served as apostolic administrator.

On October 14, 2015, Pope Francis appointed Pablo Virgilio David, then an auxiliary bishop of the Archdiocese of San Fernando, as the second bishop of Kalookan. David formally took canonical possession of the diocese on January 2, 2016.

Pope Francis announced on October 6, 2024, that David would be made a cardinal. David was created a cardinal at the consistory held on December 7, 2024, and was assigned the titular church of Trasfigurazione di Nostro Signore Gesù Cristo. His elevation made him the tenth Filipino cardinal, the first from the Diocese of Kalookan, and the first Filipino non-archbishop to enter the College of Cardinals.

Later that month, on October 23, David was elected as one of the Asian members of the Ordinary Council of the General Secretariat of the Synod.

== Statistics ==
In 2021, the diocese reported a total population of 1,330,840. About 1,184,000 people, or 89 per cent of the population, were baptized Catholics. Its 31 parishes and quasi-parishes were served by 71 priests, including 37 diocesan priests and 34 members of religious institutes.

== Bishops of Kalookan ==
No.	Portrait	Bishop	Period in office	Notes	Coat of arms
1		Deogracias Soriano Iñiguez Jr.	August 22, 2003 – January 25, 2013 (9 years, 156 days)	Resigned	
2		Pablo Virgilio Siongco Cardinal David	January 2, 2016 – present (10 years, 201 days)		

=== Apostolic administrator ===
- Francisco Mendoza de Leon (2013–2015)

== Vicariates, Parishes, and Mission Stations ==
The Diocese of Kalookan has 29 parishes, 2 quasi parishes, and 15 Mission Stations.

=== Vicariate of San Roque ===
1. San Roque Cathedral Parish, Poblacion, Caloocan City
2. Mary, Help of Christians Parish, Maypajo, Caloocan City
3. Saint Joseph the Workman Parish, Caloocan City
4. Immaculate Heart of Mary Parish, Malabon City
5. Sacred Heart of Jesus, Malabon City
6. Holy Trinity and Holy Cross Quasi-Parish, Malabon City

=== Vicariate of Our Lady of Grace ===
1. Diocesan Shrine and Parish of Our Lady of Grace, Caloocan City
2. San Pancracio Parish, La Loma Cemetery, Caloocan City
3. Hearts of Jesus and Mary Parish, Caloocan City
4. Sagrada Familia Parish, Caloocan City
5. San Jose Agudo Parish, Caloocan City

=== Vicariate of the Sacred Heart of Jesus ===
1. Saints Peter and John Parish, Portero, Malabon City
2. Saint Gabriel the Archangel Parish, Caloocan City
3. Our Lady of Lujan Parish, Caloocan City
4. Birhen ng Lourdes Parish, Caloocan City
5. Saint Francis of Assisi and Santa Quiteria Parish, Caloocan City
6. Sacred Heart of Jesus Parish, Morning Breeze Subdivision, Caloocan City

=== Vicariate of San Bartolome ===
1. Immaculate Conception Parish and Diocesan Shrine, Malabon City
2. San Bartolome Parish, Malabon City
3. Santo Rosario Parish, Malabon City
4. San Antonio de Padua Parish, Malabon City
5. Exaltation of the Holy Cross Parish, Malabon City
6. Santa Cruz Parish, Malabon City

=== Vicariate of San Jose de Navotas ===
1. Diocesan Shrine and Parish of San Jose de Navotas, Navotas City
2. San Lorenzo Ruiz and Companion Martyrs Parish, Navotas City
3. San Ildefonso Parish, Navotas City
4. San Exequiel Moreno Parish, Navotas City
5. San Roque de Navotas Parish, Navotas City
6. Santo Niño de Pasion Parish, Navotas City
7. Nuestra Señora de los Remedios Quasi Parish, Navotas City

=== Mission Stations ===
1. Sacred Heart Mission Station, Caloocan City
2. Tanza Pabahay Mission Station, Navotas City
3. San Rafael Tangos Mission Station
4. Our Lady of Fatima Mission Station, Caloocan City
5. Our Lady of Peace Letre Mission Station, Malabon City
6. Sacred Heart Kaunlaran Mission Station, Caloocan City
7. Santulan Mission Station, Malabon City

== See also ==
- Catholic Church in the Philippines
