= Governor Pascual Avenue =

Road in Malabon, Philippines

Coordinates: 14°40′4″N 120°57′53″E

- Concepcion–Potrero Road
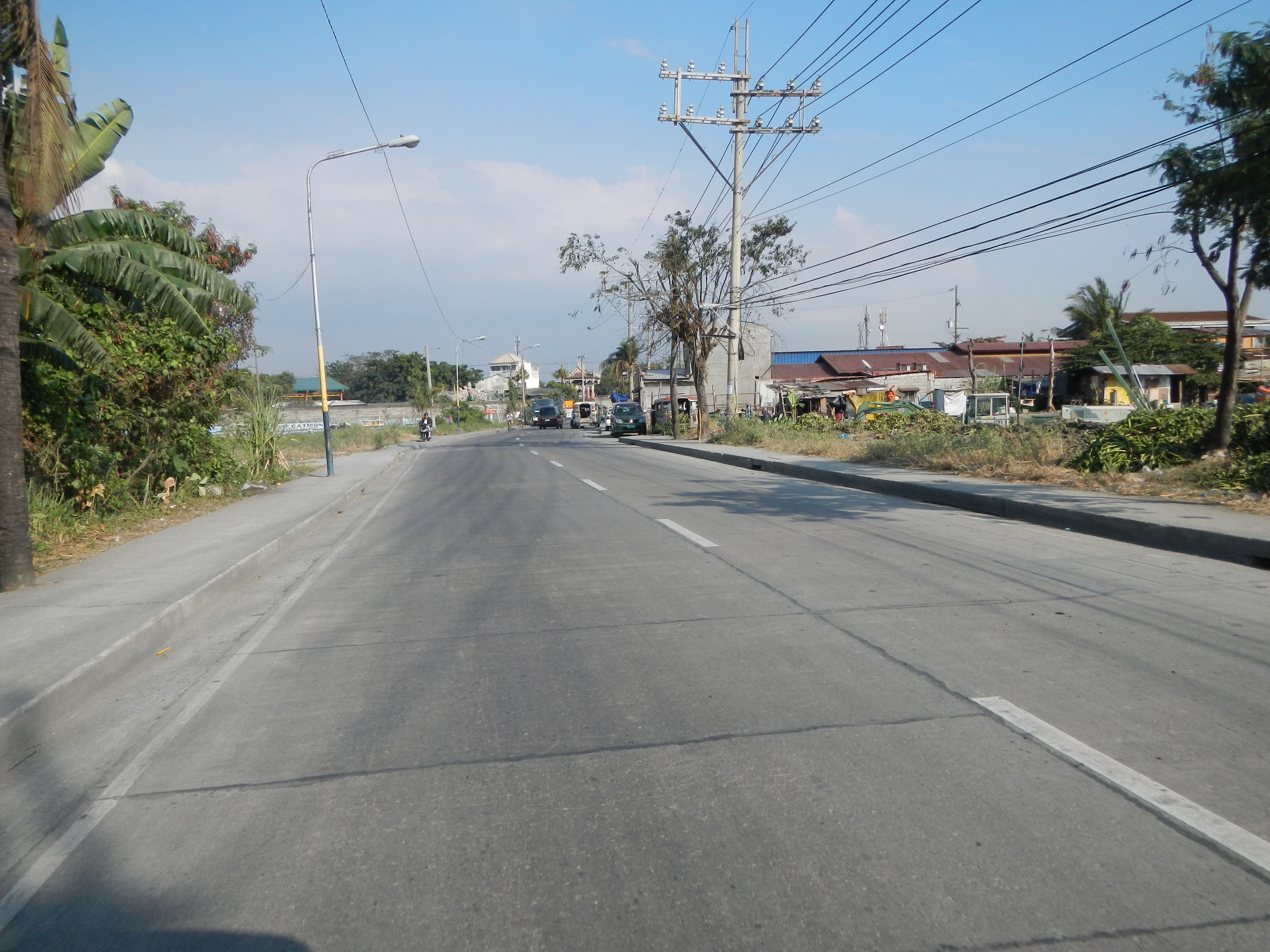
- Governor Pascual Avenue in Catmon
- Interactive map of Governor Pascual Avenue
- Namesake: Wenceslao Pascual
- Maintained by: Department of Public Works and Highways – Malabon-Navotas District Engineering Office
- Length: 4.43 km (2.75 mi)
- Location: Malabon
- West end: General Luna Street in Concepcion and Baritan
- Major junctions: Vicencio Street; Sanciangco Street; Marcelo del Pilar Street; Goldendale Avenue–Sisa Street; Industrial Avenue; Araneta Avenue–Del Monte Road
- East end: N1 (MacArthur Highway) in Potrero

Governor Wenceslao Pascual Avenue, commonly known as simply Governor Pascual Avenue, is the principal east–west artery in Malabon in Metro Manila, Philippines. It is an unsigned route in the Philippine highway network classified by the Department of Public Works and Highways as a national tertiary road. The 4.43-kilometer (2.75 mi) two-lane avenue is the longest of the city's national roads. Portions of it are prone to flooding from the Tullahan River, which flows just north of the avenue in east-central Malabon.

== History ==
The avenue was named after Wenceslao Pascual, a Malabon native who served as the governor of Rizal from 1952 to 1955 when the then-municipality was still part of the province. The ancestral house in Hulong Duhat, built in 1930 and designed by Juan Nakpil, where the former governor was born, is preserved by the government through a local ordinance.

Construction of the avenue commenced in September 1954 under the governorship of Wenceslao Pascual. It was completed in August 1970 and inaugurated in December of that year by Governor Isidro Rodriguez and members of the Rizal Provincial Board. The avenue, initially named Concepcion–Potrero Road, Isabel Avenue, and earlier called Bagong Daan by residents, was converted by the Department of Public Works and Highways from a provincial road to a national road in 1984.

== Route description ==
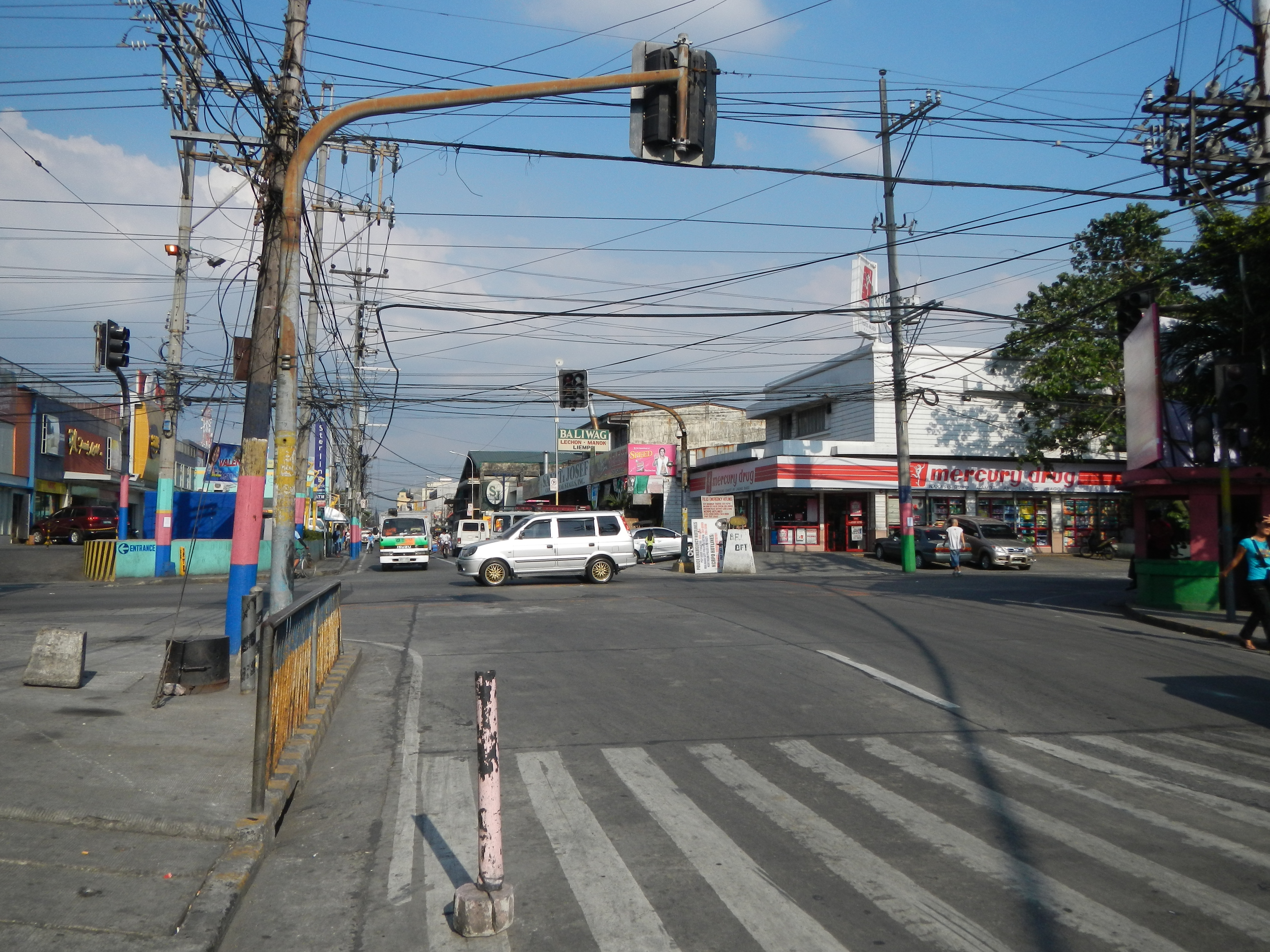
Governor Pascual Avenue at its junction with Marcelo H. Del Pilar Street in Barangay Tugatog

Governor Pascual Avenue forms a major spine of Malabon connecting barangays Potrero, Tinajeros, Acacia, Tugatog, Catmon, Baritan and Concepcion. It travels in a roughly east–west orientation, following the curves of the Tullahan River from Potrero in the east to Concepcion in the west. From its eastern terminus at MacArthur Highway as a small traffic circle called Pinagtipunan Circle in Potrero, the avenue runs to the northwest for 1.4 kilometers (0.87 mi) through mainly industrial areas across Malabon's largest village. At its east end, the Malabon Zoo and Potrero Elementary School are notable landmarks. It turns to the west-southwest by the GIC Compound Industrial Road and crosses the Philippine National Railways line below the elevated North Luzon Expressway Harbor Link, which marks the western boundary of Potrero.

Robinsons Town Mall Malabon on Governor Pascual Avenue

From this junction, where the Governor Pascual railway station is located, the avenue serves as the dividing line between Tinajeros and Acacia and also links to the northern edge of Tugatog near the intersection of Marcelo H. del Pilar Street. Along this section of Governor Pascual Avenue are many commercial establishments, including Robinsons Town Mall Malabon. The avenue winds through the heavily populated village of Catmon, where the Malabon People's Park is on a small side road just off Sanciangco Street. It then heads for an open marshland just before crossing the Lambingan Bridge to Concepcion over the Tullahan River.

West of the Lambingan Bridge, the avenue runs along the boundary between Baritan on the north and Concepcion on the south. This section of the avenue north of Malabon's poblacion is known for its gastronomic culture and is home to several restaurants serving the city's native delicacies, such as kakanin and Pancit Malabon, including Dolor's at Bernardo Street and Nanay's Pancit Malabon at Santa Ana Street. It is also the location of the José Rizal campus of Arellano University and the City of Malabon Polytechnic Institute. The avenue terminates at General Luna Street just north of the Concepcion Public Market.
