= Malabon People's Park =

Urban park Catmon, Malabon, the Philippines

Coordinates: 14°40′16″N 120°57′37″E

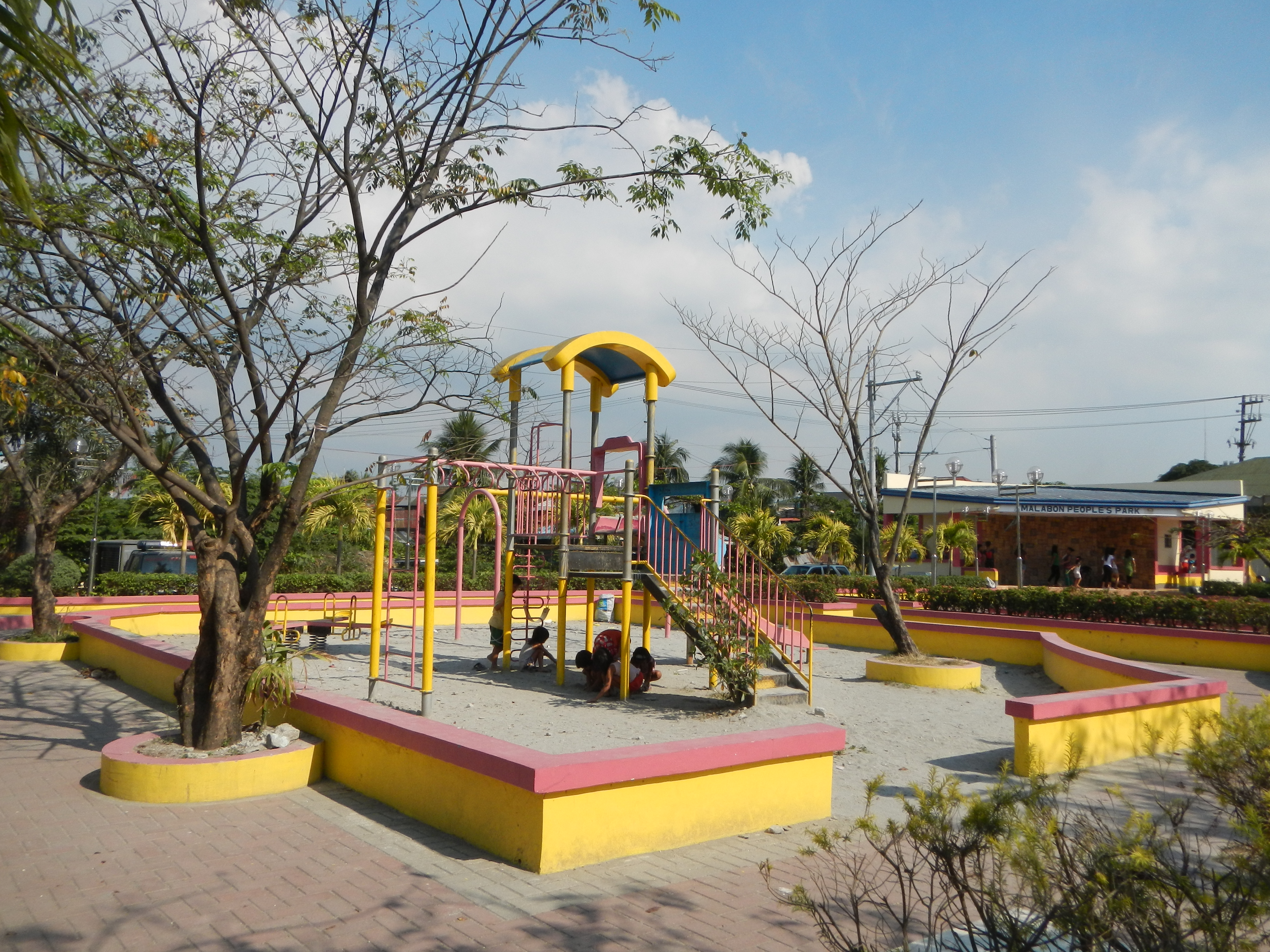
- The park at the Justice Compound in Catmon, Malabon
- Interactive map of Malabon People's Park
- Type: Urban park
- Location: Malabon, Philippines
- Area: 0.3 hectares (3,000 m^{2})
- Created: 2012
- Operator: Locat Government of Malabon
- Status: Opened

The Malabon People's Park, also known as Catmon People's Park, is an urban park situated in the densely populated village of Catmon, in the northern Metro Manila city of Malabon, the Philippines. The 0.3-hectare (0.74-acre) park occupies the central plaza of the Justice Compound, home of the Malabon Prosecutor's Office and formerly the Malabon-Navotas Regional Trial Court until 2010. It is located just off Sanciangco Street near its intersection with Governor Pascual Avenue in a flood-prone part of the city close to the south bank of the Tullahan River.

The plan for the Catmon park was announced in 2011 when the Malabon city government allotted ₱9,194.12 for the installation of playground equipment at the Justice Compound as part of its 2012 budget. It was inaugurated by Mayor Antolin Oreta on December 16, 2012, and was subsequently named the "People's Park."

Amenities in the park include a multi-purpose stage, an area for aerobics sessions, and a 1,500-square-metre (16,000 sq ft) children's playground that includes an air walker, self-weighted rower and dome climber. It also has a badminton and tennis court, comfort rooms, stone benches and accessibility features for persons with disability. The Malabon City Main Library, one of only two public libraries in the city, is situated just across the street from the park. It was built in 1995 to replace the old facility near the Malabon City Hall in San Agustin. In 2011, the New Malabon City Jail was built by the national government through its Bureau of Jail Management and Penology at the site of the former regional trial court which moved to higher ground in Goldenvale Subdivision, Tinajeros in 2010 after the destruction caused by Typhoon Ketsana (Ondoy).

In January 2014, the construction of a basketball half court at the park was announced and was given a budget of ₱935,862.32 under the Malabon General Fund CY 2014. In July of the same year, the Malabon city government under Mayor Oreta entered into a contract with a local builder for the construction of a full covered court amounting to ₱5.9 million and designed to be 1 square metre (11 sq ft) above the ground to prevent flood damage during calamities. The following month, the local government also awarded the rehabilitation of the drainage line located at the park to a local construction firm.

The Malabon local government also plans to roll out a mini-government center at the people's park, as well as a youth center for juvenile delinquents, basketball and volleyball courts, a new police headquarters and a fire station.

== Gallery ==
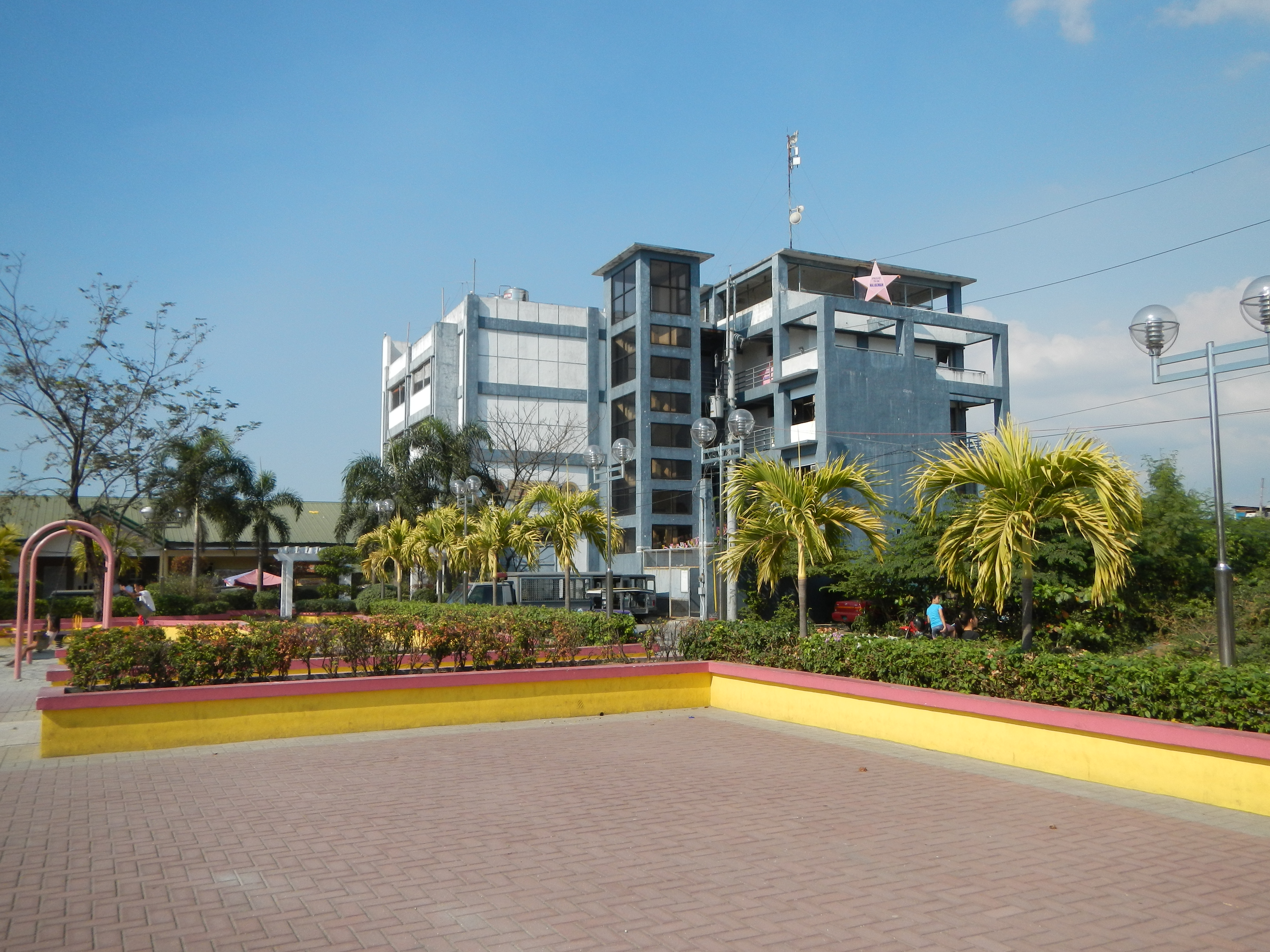
The New Malabon City Jail

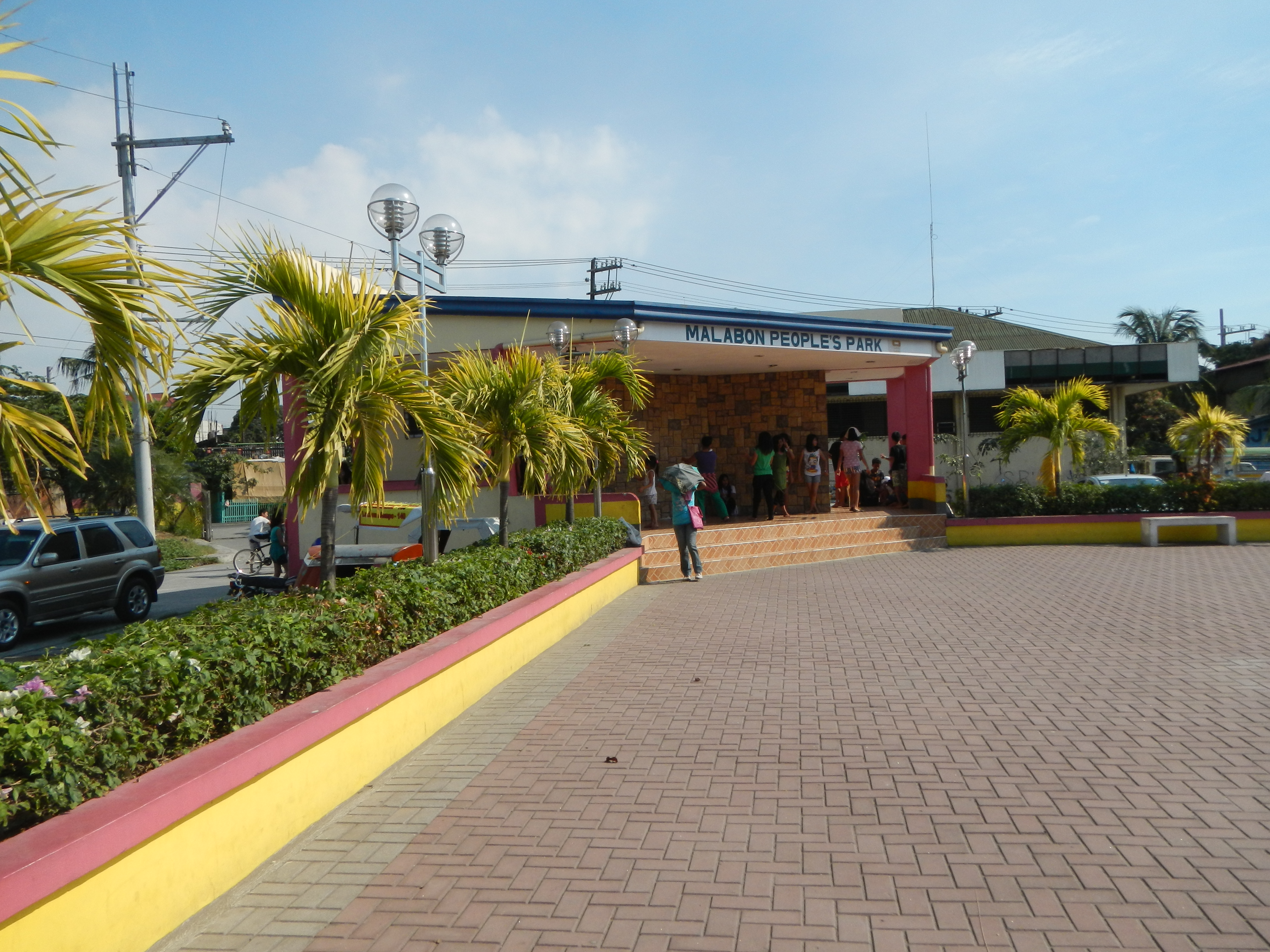
Malabon People's Park Grandstand

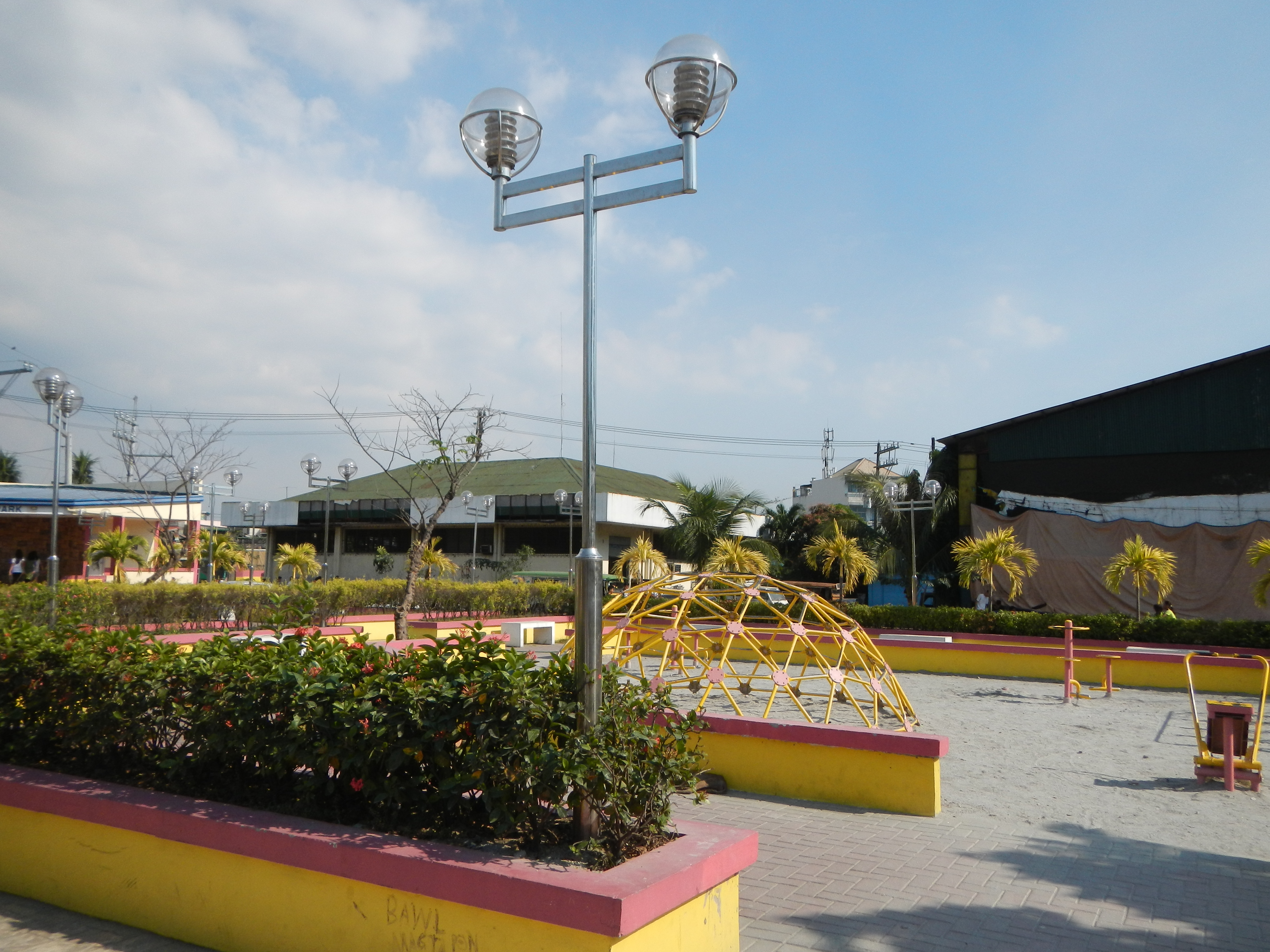
The Malabon City Library (center) and the Catmon Covered Court (right) behind the park

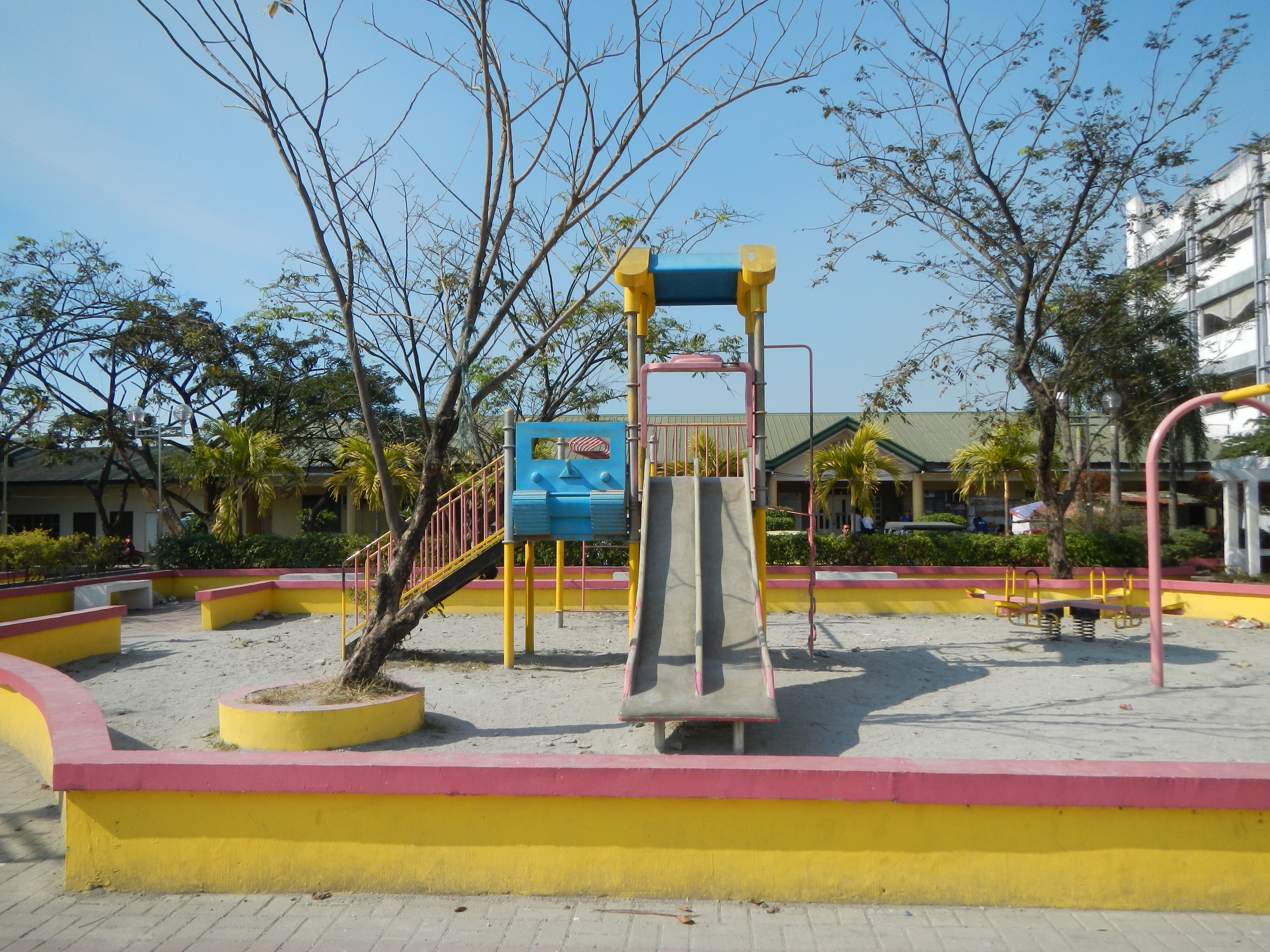
Children's playground

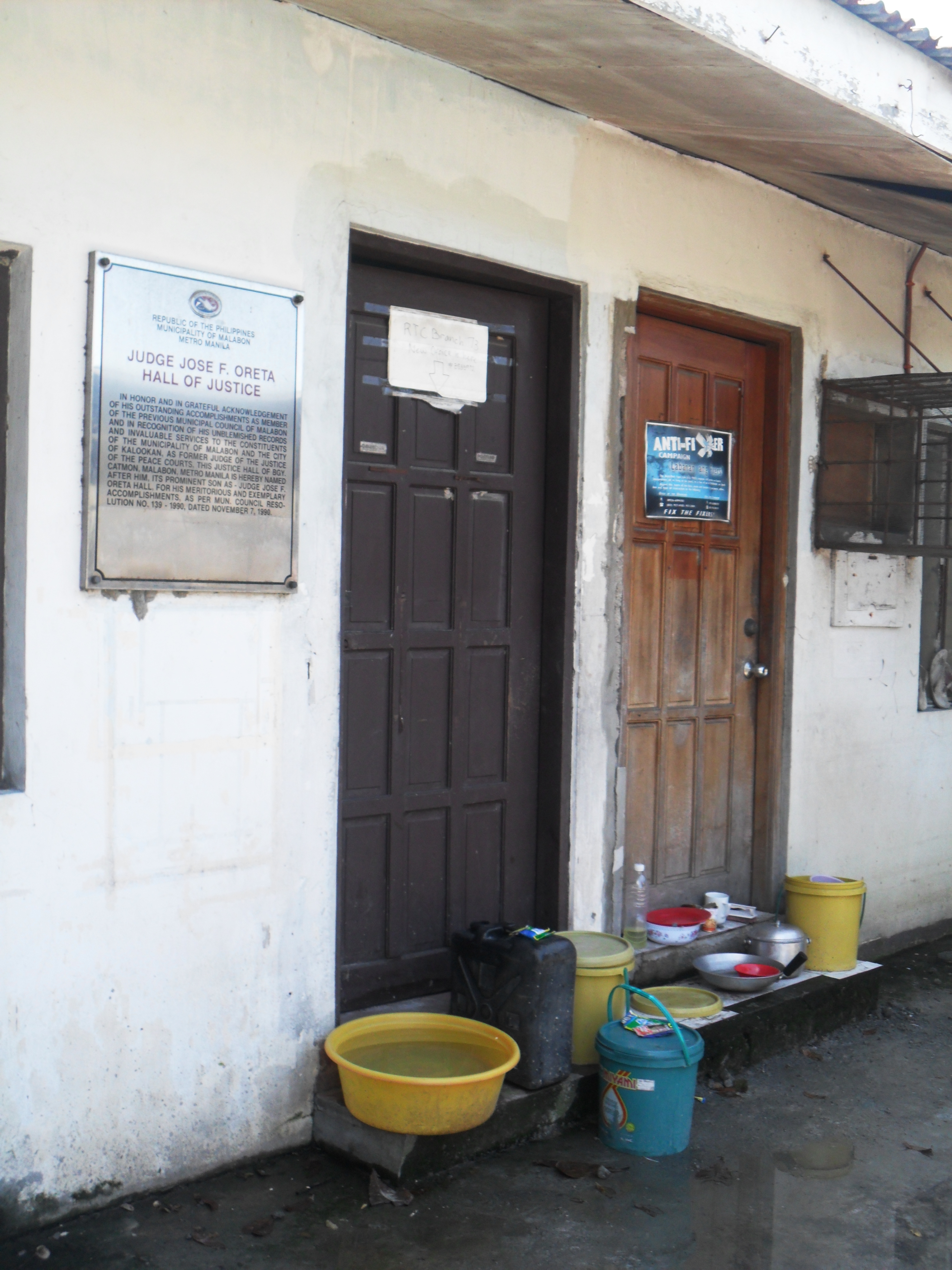
The Judge Jose F. Oreta Hall of Justice

== See also ==
- List of parks in Metro Manila
