= Malabon Zoo =

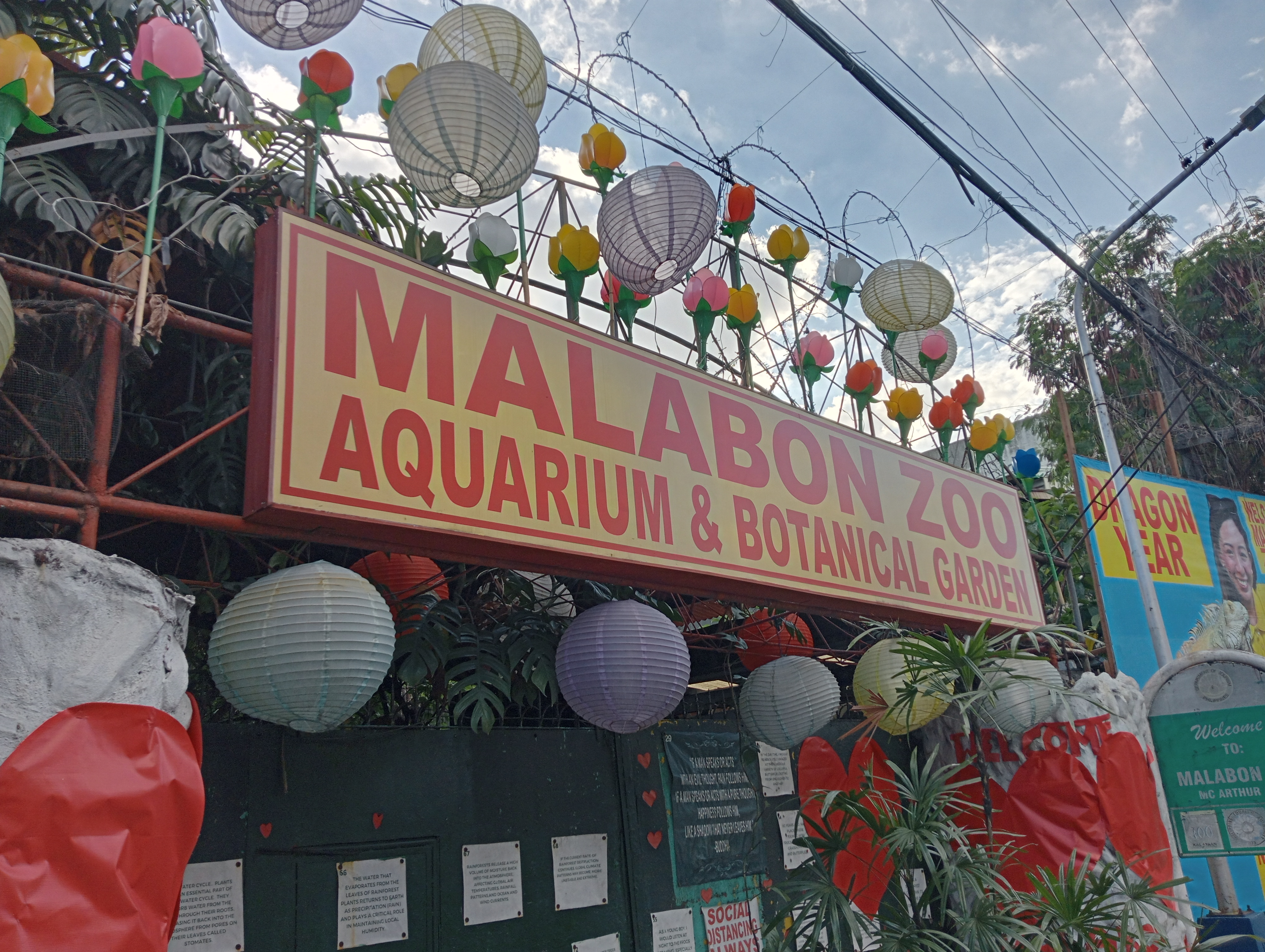
- The zoo in 2024
- Interactive map of Malabon Zoo
- 14.6635°N 120.9829°E
- Date opened: 1989
- Location: Potrero, Malabon, Metro Manila, Philippines
- Management: Malabon Zoo Foundation

The Malabon Zoo, Aquarium and Botanical Garden, commonly known as Malabon Zoo, is a zoo situated in Malabon, Metro Manila, Philippines.

== History ==
The Malabon Zoo first opened around 1989 and was founded by Manny Tangco in Barangay Potrero in Malabon, Metro Manila. In March 2020, community quarantine measures imposed as a response to the COVID-19 pandemic forced the closure of the zoo to the public and caused financial strain to the zoo's maintenance. This led Tangco launching an appeal for donations so he could still feed the zoo's animals, which was responded by various private and public personalities. The zoo has since reopened on November 7, 2021.

== Animals ==
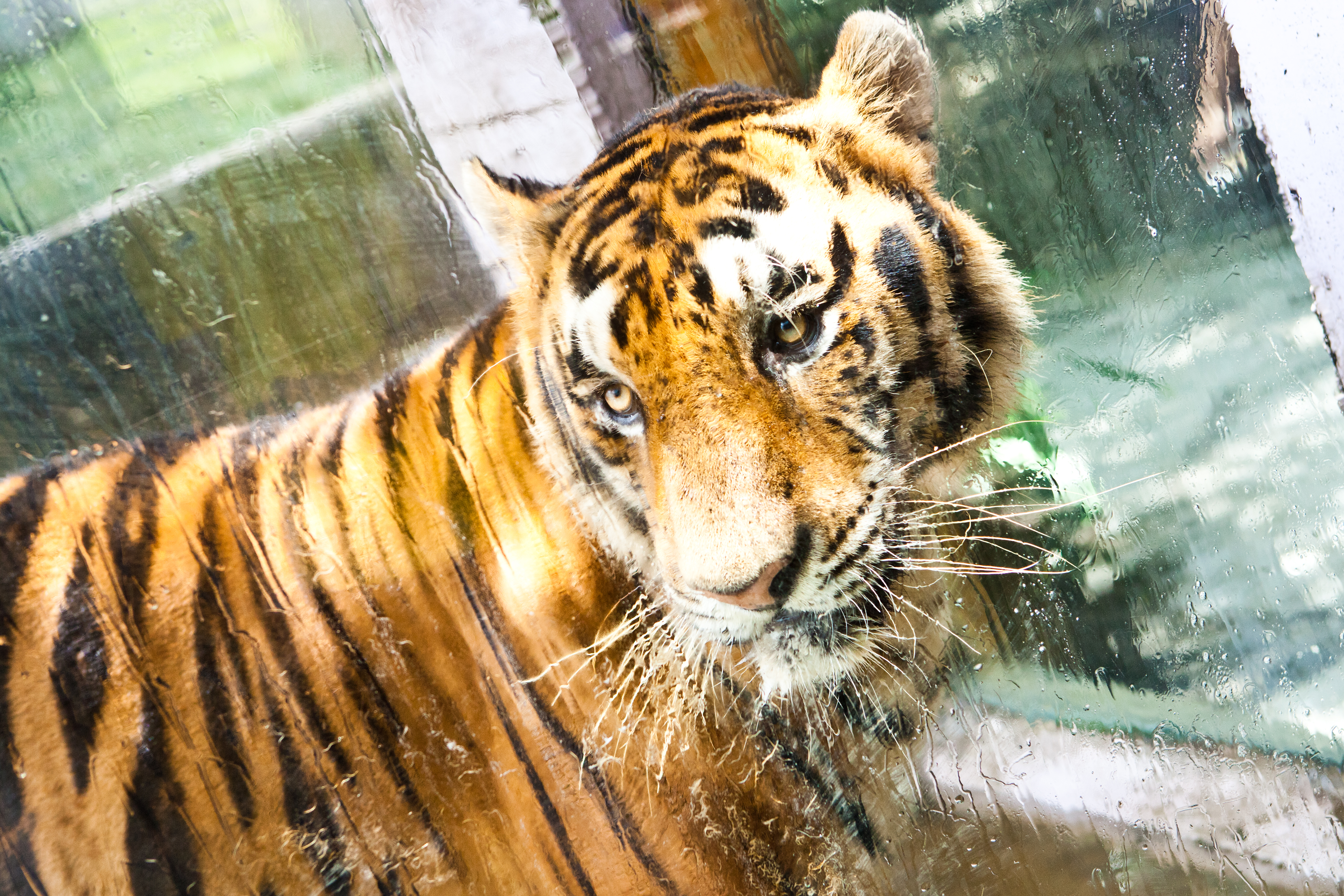
A tiger in Malabon Zoo

Malabon Zoo has animals named after public figures including former and current politicians, actors, actresses and other public figures. Its animals include Bengal tigers, lions, bears, deer, orangutans, and snakes.
