= Tom Ong =

Filipino sports shooter

Personal information
- Born: October 21, 1938 Malabon, Rizal, Philippine Islands
- Died: December 14, 2016 (aged 78)

Sport
- Country: Philippines
- Sport: Shooting
- Event: Mixed 25m rapid fire pistol

Mariano "Tom" Ong (October 1938 – December 14, 2016) was a Filipino sports shooter.

Ong, born in October 1938 in Malabon, competed for the Philippines at the 1972 and 1976 Summer Olympics. He competed in the mixed 25m rapid fire pistol.

Ong owned the Malabon Soap and Oil Industrial Co., Inc. which operated the Spring Cooking Oil business. His son later took responsibility for the business' operations.

Ong died on December 14, 2016, of cardiac arrest following two hours of dialysis for his deteriorating kidneys. A diabetic, he frequently visited a hospital beginning in June 2016. He was survived by six children including Nathaniel Padilla. He was 78.
