= Tugatog =

Barangay in Malabon City, Metro Manila, Philippines

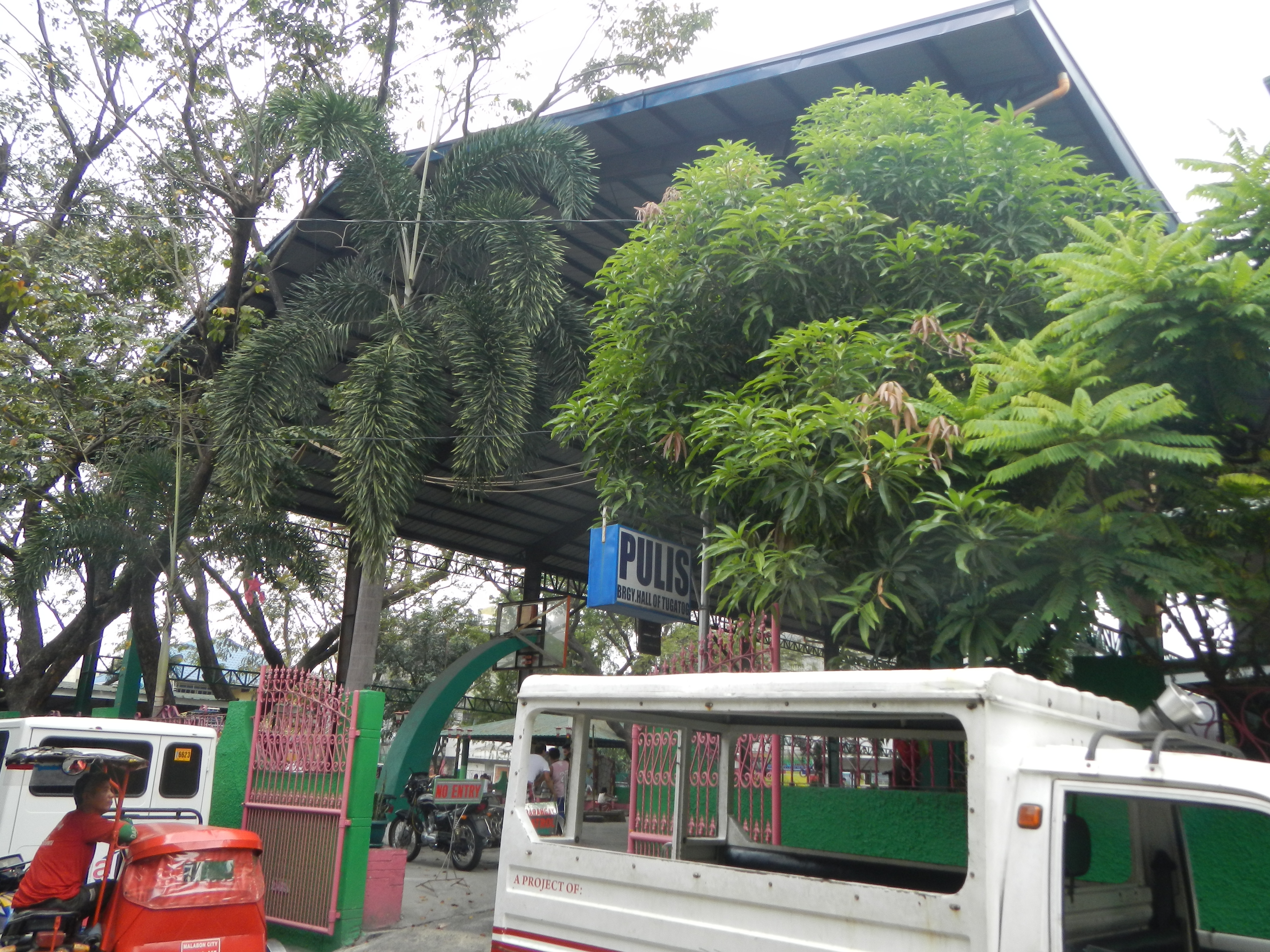
- Diwa Sports Complex

- Location within Metro Manila
- Coordinates: 14°39′46.51″N 120°58′8.36″E
- Country: Philippines
- Region: National Capital Region or NCR
- City: Malabon
- Congressional districts: Part of the Malabon Congressional District

Government
  - Barangay Chairman: Lara Cruz

Area
  - Total: 93.9 km^{2} (36.3 sq mi)

Population (2007)
  - Total: 23,296

Tugatog is a barangay of Malabon in Metro Manila in the Philippines.
