= Tinajeros, Malabon =

Barangay in Malabon City, Metro Manila, Philippines

Tinajeros
- Barangay
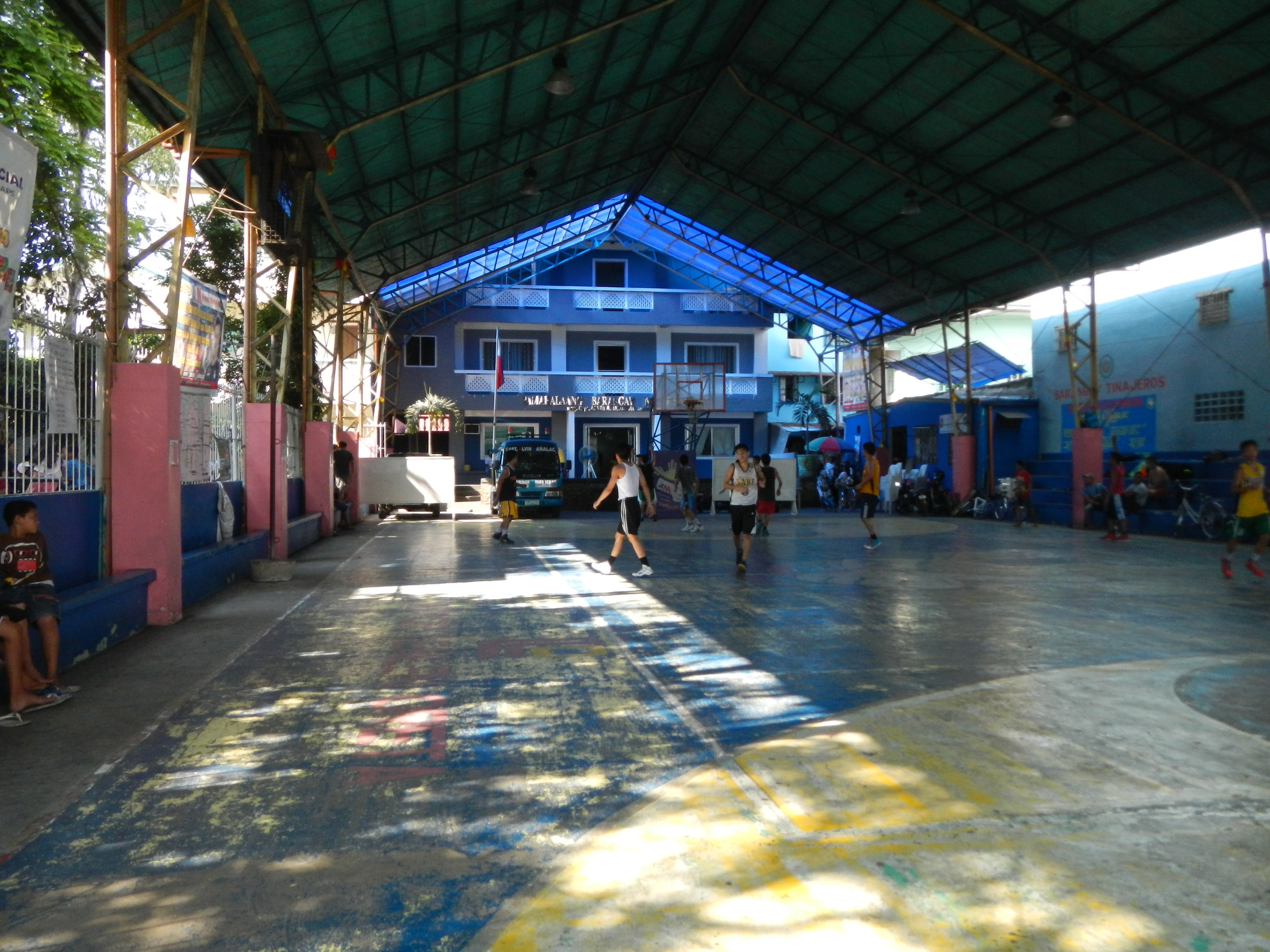
- Barangay Tinajeros Sports Complex, with Tinajeros Barangay Hall in the background

- Location within Metro Manila
- Coordinates: 14°40′23.79″N 120°58′8.36″E
- Country: Philippines
- Region: National Capital Region
- City: Malabon
- District: 2nd Legislative district of Malabon

Government
  - Type: Barangay
  - Barangay Captain: Ambet Bautista

Area
  - Total: 93.9 km^{2} (36.3 sq mi)

Population (2000)
  - Total: 18,387
  - Density: 196/km^{2} (507/sq mi)
- Time zone: UTC+8 (PST)

Tinajeros is a barangay of Malabon in the Philippines.

== Industry ==
There are two candle manufacturers: Sevilla Candle Factory and Liwanag Candles (Bahay Liwanag).

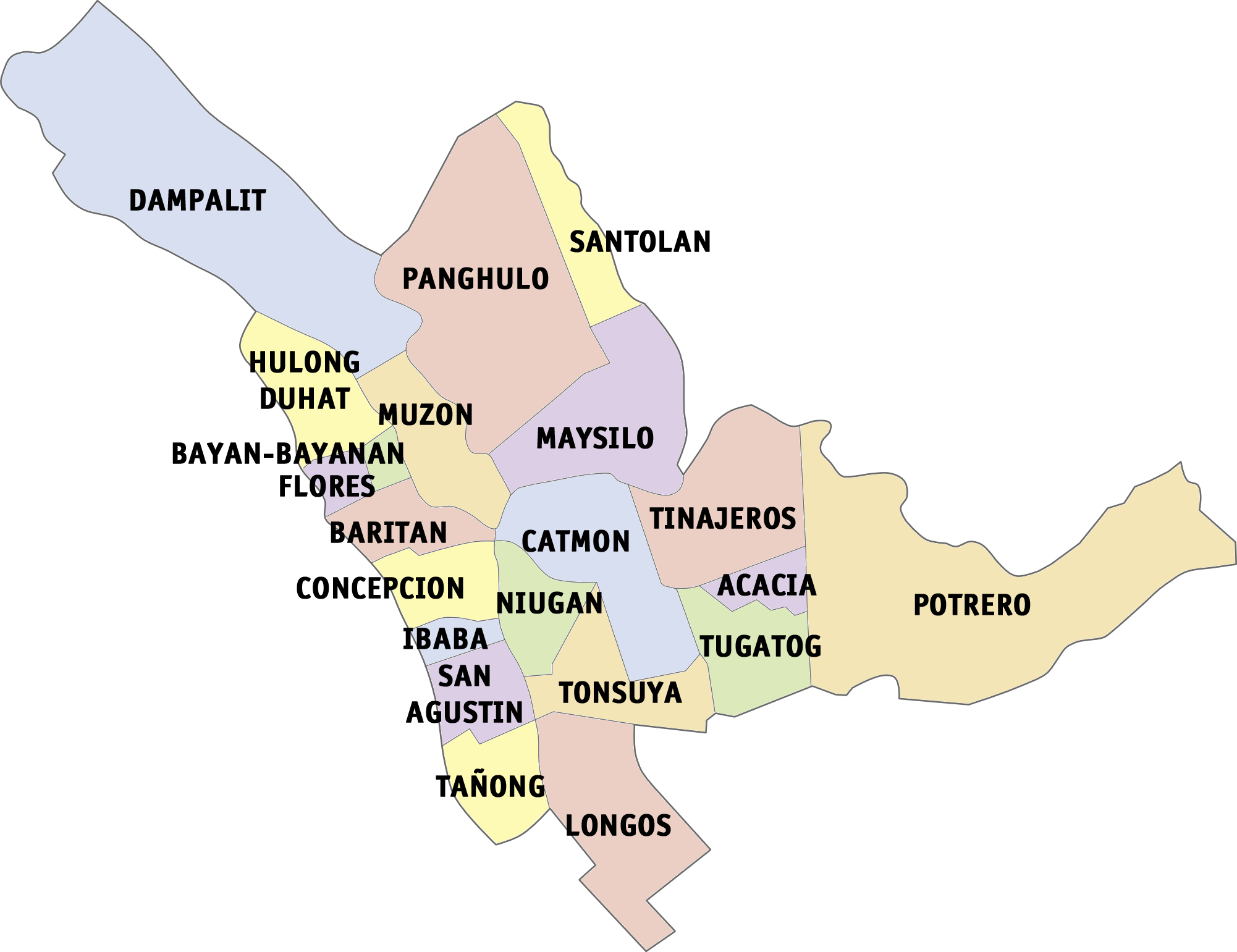
Barangays of Malabon

== Education ==
- Tinajeros Elementary School
- Guillermo S. Sanchez Memorial Elementary School
- Tinajeros National High School - located at B. Rivera St. Tinajeros Malabon
- Asian Science and Technological Institute (under New Professional Education Management Group) - TESDA accredited
- SME - a private elementary school
- Bon Little Angels Academy
- Nazirites Christian Academy
- Village Democracy Education and Development Center (promoting peaceful, progressive, productive and innovative local communities) - TESDA accreditation ongoing
- Bright Beginnings Center for Young Children

== Religion ==
- Roman Catholic Church - Holy Trinity Quasi-Parish (feast day: Trinity Sunday)
- Iglesia ni Cristo
- Malabon International Baptist Church, led by Bishop Pio Tica
- Sacrum Krishma Healing and Meditation Ministry
