= Malabon =

Highly urbanized city in Metro Manila, Philippines

- Highly urbanized city
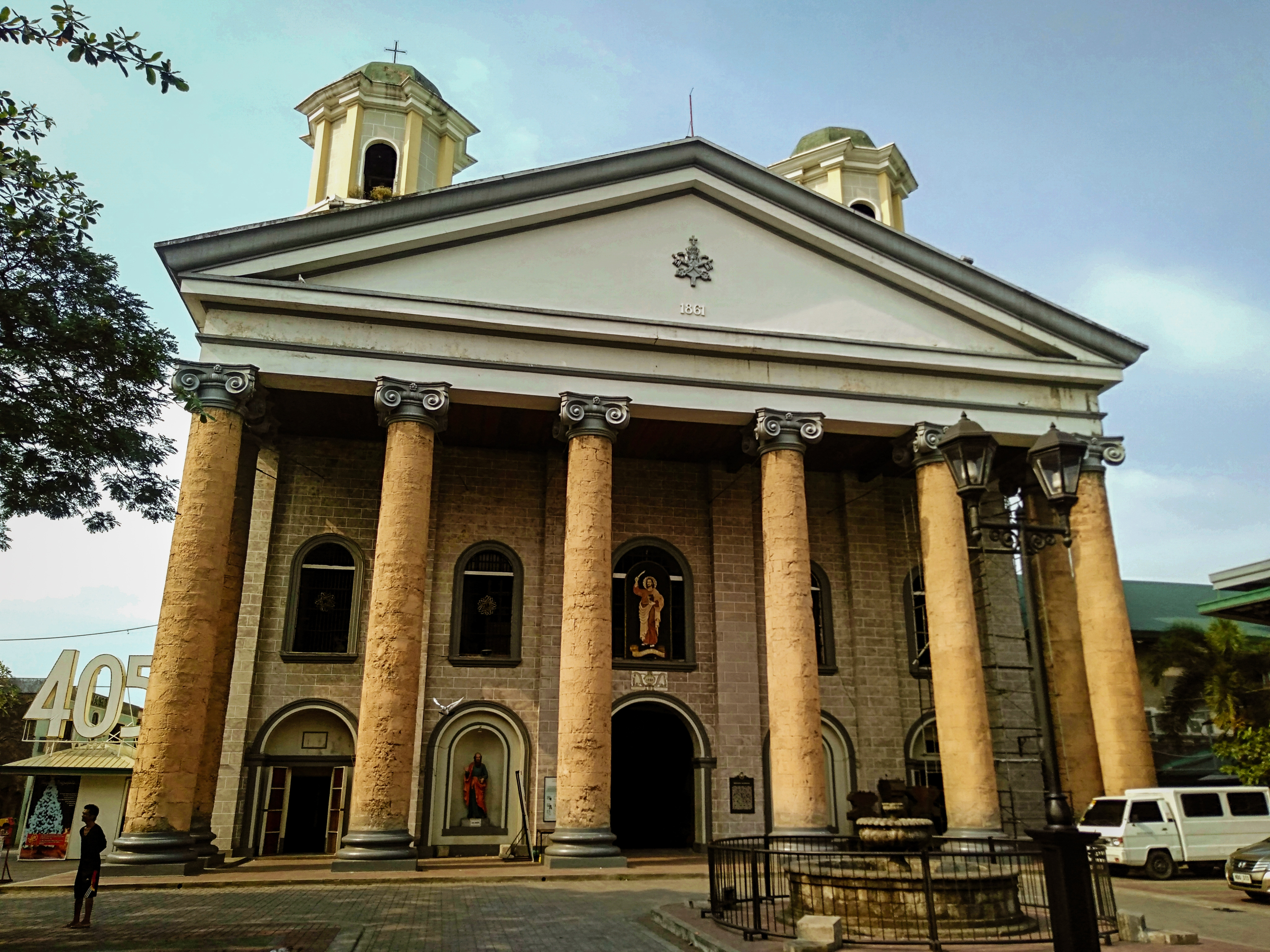
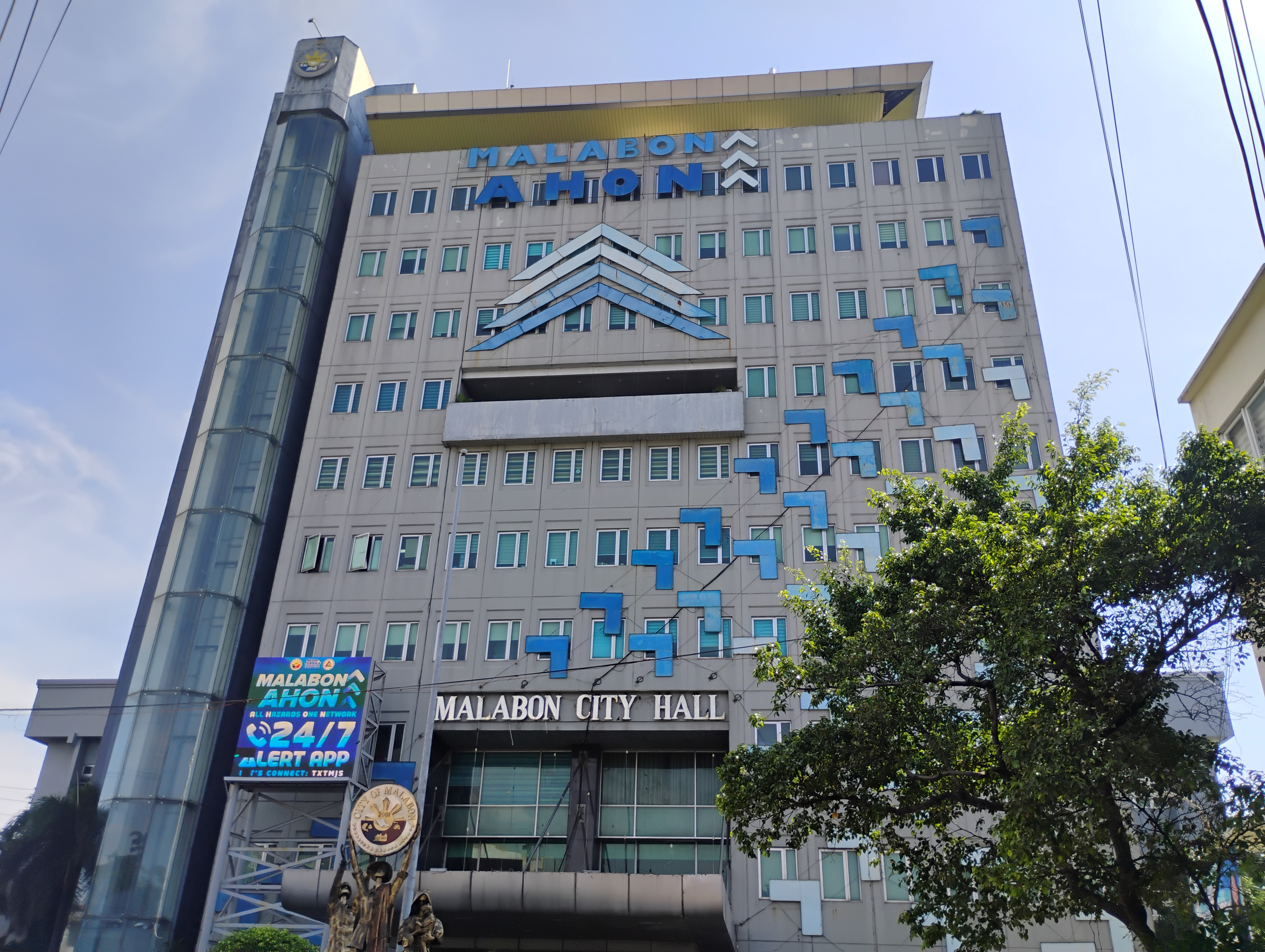
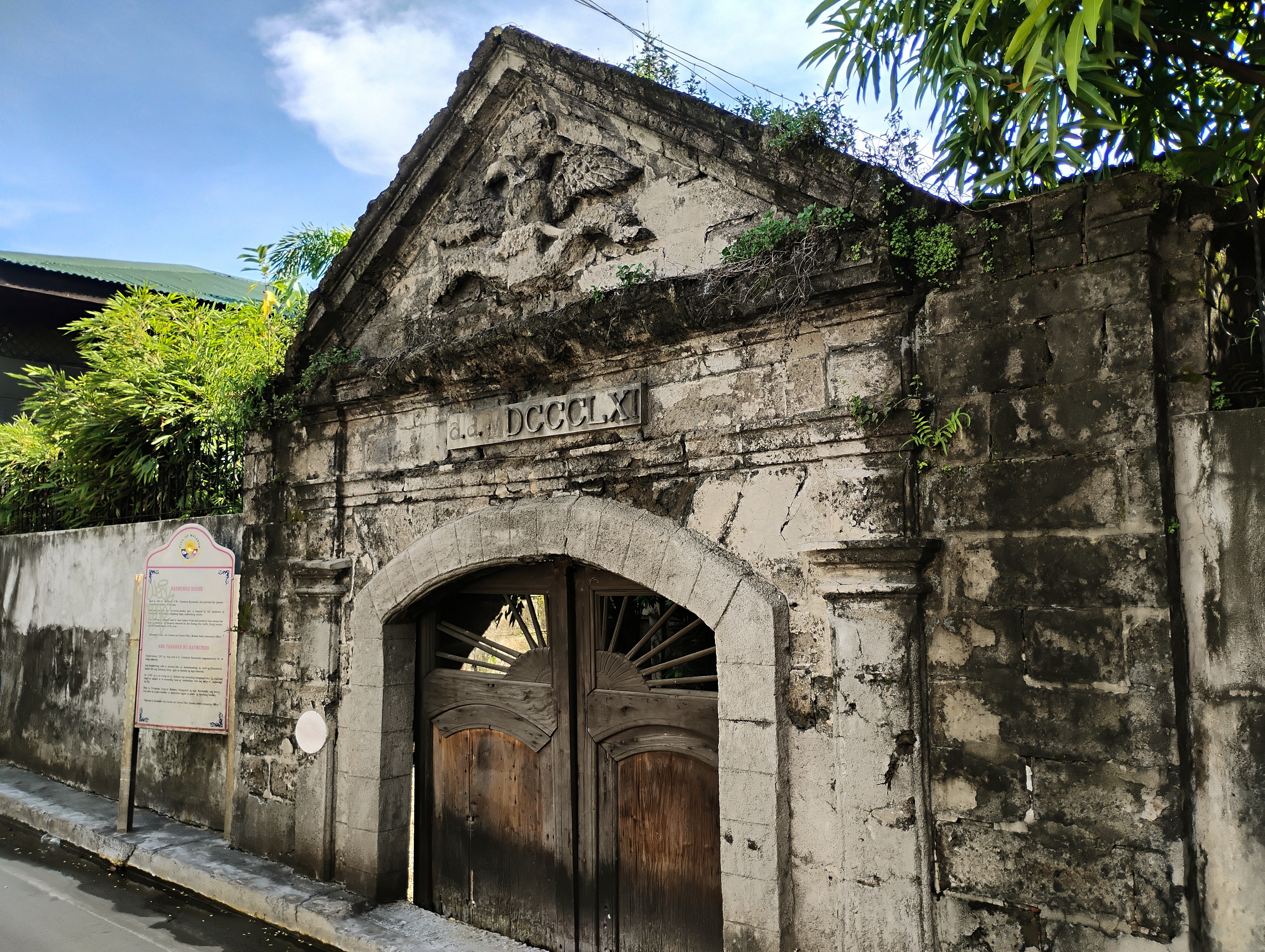
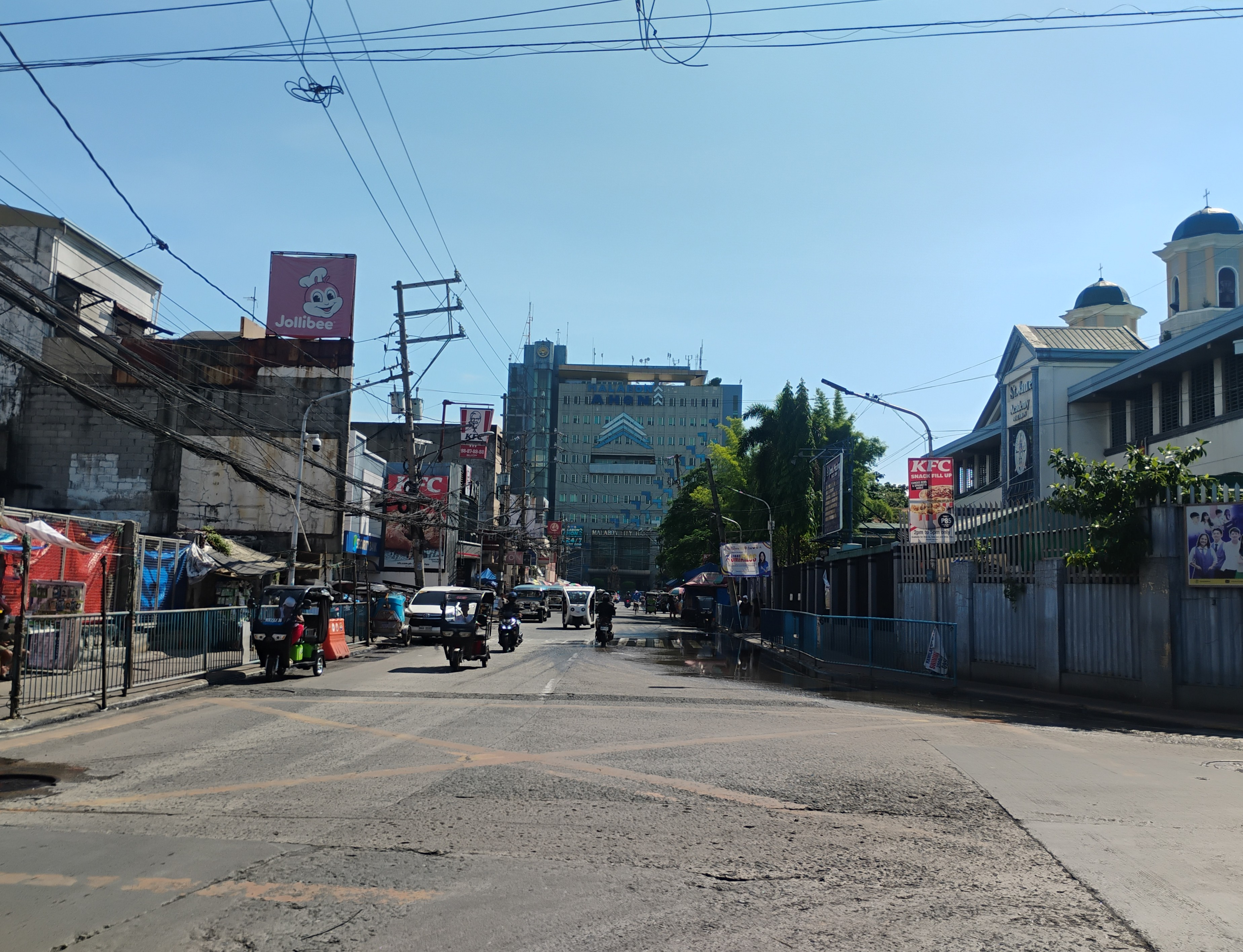
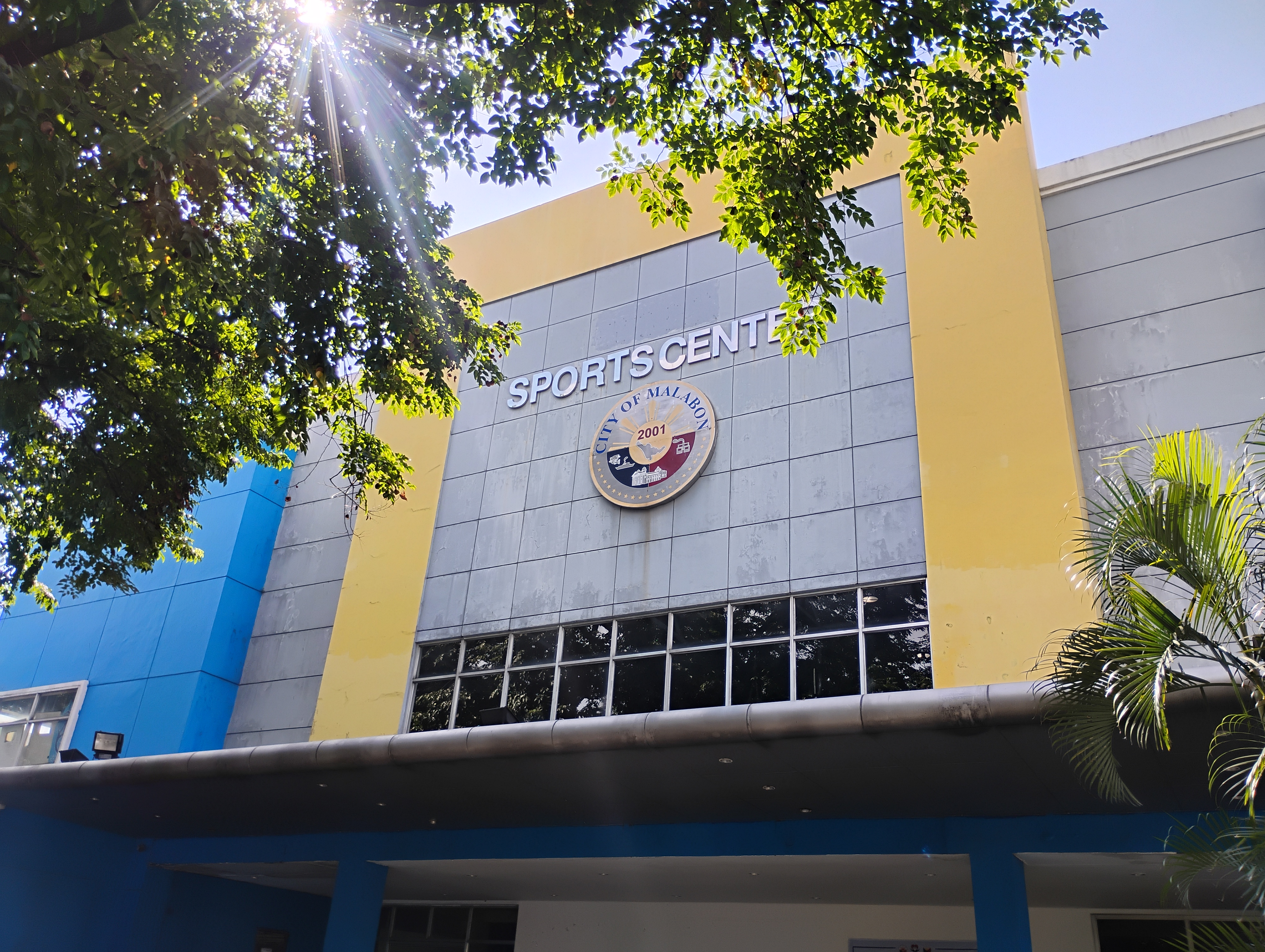
- From top, left to right: San Bartolome Parish Church, Malabon City Hall, Raymundo Ancestral House, Rizal Avenue, Malabon Sports Center

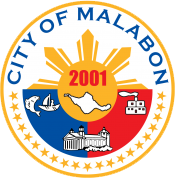
- Seal
- Motto: Malabon Ahon!
- Anthem: Ang Bagong Malabon (The New Malabon)
- Map of Metro Manila with Malabon highlighted
- Interactive map of Malabon
- Location within the Philippines
- Coordinates: 14°40′N 120°58′E
- Country: Philippines
- Region: Metro Manila
- Province: none
- District: Lone district
- Founded: May 21, 1599
- Chartered: June 11, 1901
- Cityhood and HUC: April 21, 2001
- Barangays: 21 (see Barangays)

Government
  - Type: Sangguniang Panlungsod
  - Mayor: Jeannie Ng-Sandoval (Nacionalista)
  - Vice Mayor: Edward Nolasco (Lakas)
  - Representative: Antolin Oreta III (NUP)
  - Councilors: List: 1st District: Maricar Torres; Ian Emmanuel Borja; Ma. Anna Lizza Yambao; Paulo Oreta; Genaro "Gerry" Bernardo; Payapa Ona; 2nd District: Jose Lorenzo Oreta; Nadja Marie Vicencio; Jasper Kevin Cruz; Edralin "Len" Yanga; Sofronia Lim; Romualdo Cunanan; ABC President: Ejercito B. Aquino; SK Federation President: Buboy Dimagiba
  - Electorate: 233,868 voters (2025)

Area
  - Total: 15.71 km^{2} (6.07 sq mi)
- Elevation: 23 m (75 ft)
- Highest elevation: 27.4 m (90 ft)
- Lowest elevation: −2 m (−6.6 ft)

Population (2024 census)
  - Total: 389,929
  - Density: 24,820/km^{2} (64,280/sq mi)
  - Households: 94,241
- Demonym(s): Taga-Malabon; Malabueño; Malabonian

Economy
  - Income class: 1st city income class
  - Poverty incidence: 2.3% (2023)
  - Revenue: ₱ 2,383 million (2024)
  - Assets: ₱ 6,062 million (2024)
  - Expenditure: ₱ 3,013 million (2024)
  - Liabilities: ₱ 3,459 million (2024)

Service provider
  - Electricity: Manila Electric Company (Meralco)
- Time zone: UTC+8 (PST)
- PSGC: 137502000
- IDD : area code: +63 (0)02
- Native languages: Filipino
- Major religions: Catholic
- Catholic diocese: Roman Catholic Diocese of Kalookan
- Patron saint: San Bartolome De Malabon, La Inmaculada Concepcion De Malabon
- Website: malabon.gov.ph

Malabon, officially the City of Malabon (Filipino: Lungsod ng Malabon), is a highly urbanized city in the National Capital Region of the Philippines. According to the 2024 census, it has a population of 389,929 people. Located just north of the city of Manila, Malabon is primarily residential, industrial and one of the most densely populated cities in the metropolis, having a total land area of 15.96 square kilometers (6.16 sq mi)

Malabon is part of the sub-region of Metro Manila informally called CAMANAVA, an area which derives its name from the first syllable of its component cities: Caloocan, Malabon, Navotas, and Valenzuela. Caloocan lies to the south and east, Navotas to the west, and Valenzuela to the north. Malabon also borders the town of Obando in the province of Bulacan to the northwest.

== Etymology ==
The name Malabon is from Tagalog word malabon, meaning "having many silt deposits (labon)." The name was previously also used for two other places in Cavite during the early Spanish colonial period: Santa Cruz de Malabon (now Tanza) and San Francisco de Malabon (now General Trias). It is previously named as Tambobong, after the rural Tagalog word tambúbong, which translates to "barn".

== History ==
=== Spanish rule ===
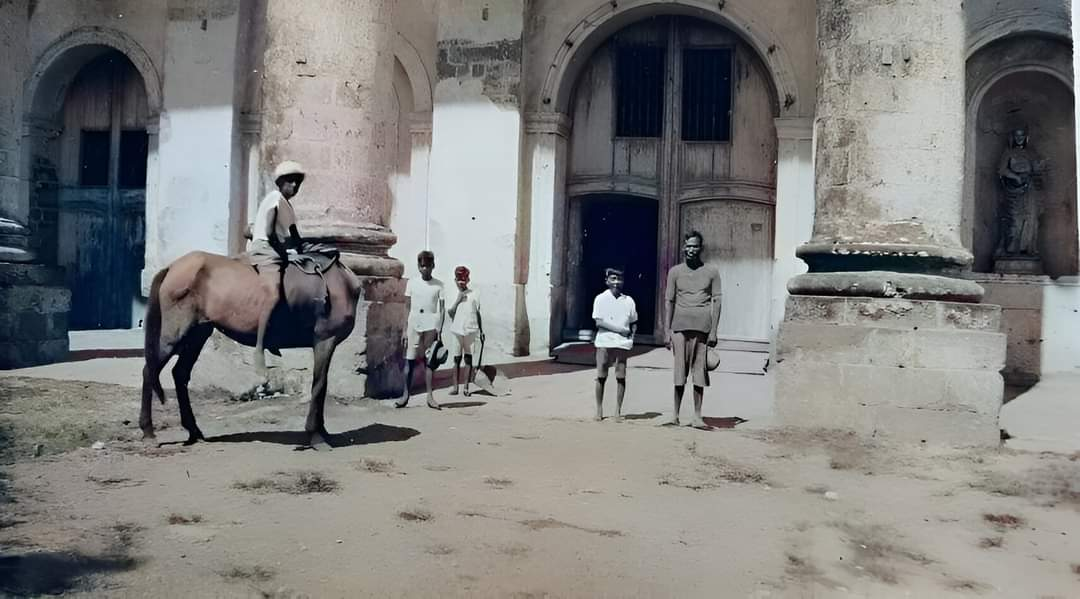
Malabon church (circa late 1800's - early 1900's)

Originally called Tambobong, Malabon was founded as a visita (hamlet) of Tondo by the Augustinians on May 21, 1599. It remained under the administrative jurisdiction of the Province of Tondo (renamed to Manila in 1859) from 1627 to 1688.

Malabon played an important economic role in the late 19th century with the founding of La Princesa Tabacalera tobacco company in 1851 and the Malabon Sugar Company in 1878. La Princesa was under the corporate umbrella of Compañia General de Tabacos de Filipinas (owned by the Spanish Crown), while the latter pioneered the refined sugar industry in the Philippines.

In 1859, three Malabon barangays—San Jose, Navotas, and Bangkulasi—were separated from Tambobong to form a new town that is now Navotas.

The newspaper La Independencia was first printed in Malabon's Asilo de Huérfanos (Orphanage), where children orphaned by the Plague of 1882 were housed.

In 1889, a stream tram line from Tondo borough reached Malabon, later to be linked to the other lines of horse drawn and later electric tramcars in Manila, the latter operated by Meralco until the Second World War. The steam connection would be one of the pioneer steam-powered rail services in Southeast Asia and the first at large in the Philippines, pre-dating the Main Line North of the Philippine National Railways which opened in 1891, 2 years later.

=== American rule ===
The first Mayor of Malabon was Don Agustín Salamante, a Spanish mestizo originally from Cavite. The first Filipino Mayor of Malabon was Don Vicente Villongco in 1899, during the onset of the American regime.

Malabon was officially made a municipality of the newly created Province of Rizal on June 11, 1901, by virtue of Philippine Commission Act No. 137. From 1903 to 1906, Navotas was returned to Malabon to form a single municipality.

=== Since independence and cityhood ===
Malabon remained a municipality of Rizal until November 7, 1975, when Malabon became a part of the National Capital Region or Metro Manila by virtue of Presidential Decree No. 824.

Malabon became a highly urbanized city on April 21, 2001, under Republic Act No. 9019, 407 years after its founding.

== Geography ==
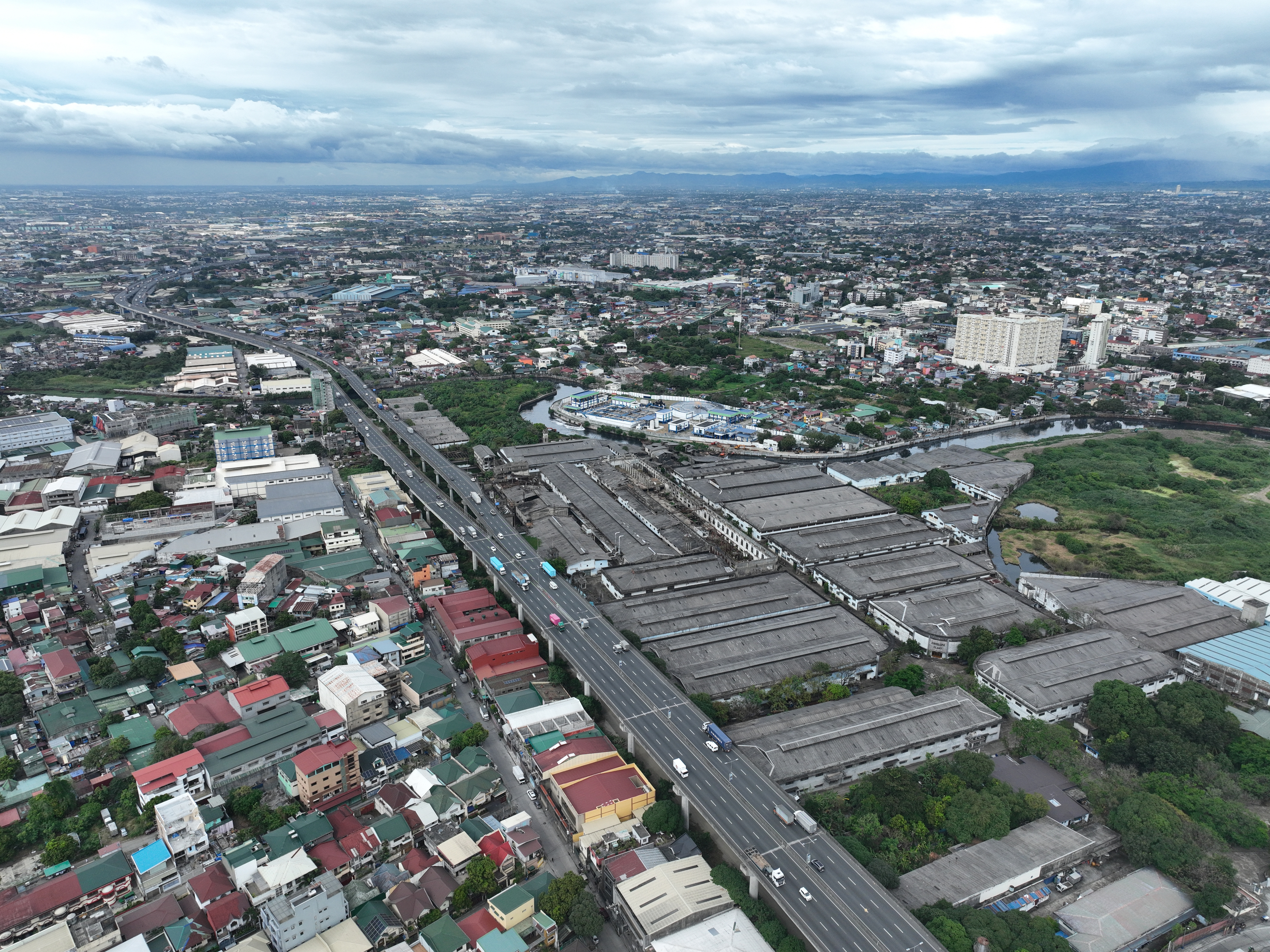
Drone shot of Malabon, situating south of the Tullahan River

Malabon is one of the most densely populated cities in the Philippines and its low-lying, flat terrain makes it prone to frequent flooding, especially during high tides, heavy rains and when river and dams overflow. The four cities in CAMANAVA are commonly affected by interconnected rivers, one of which is the Tullahan River.

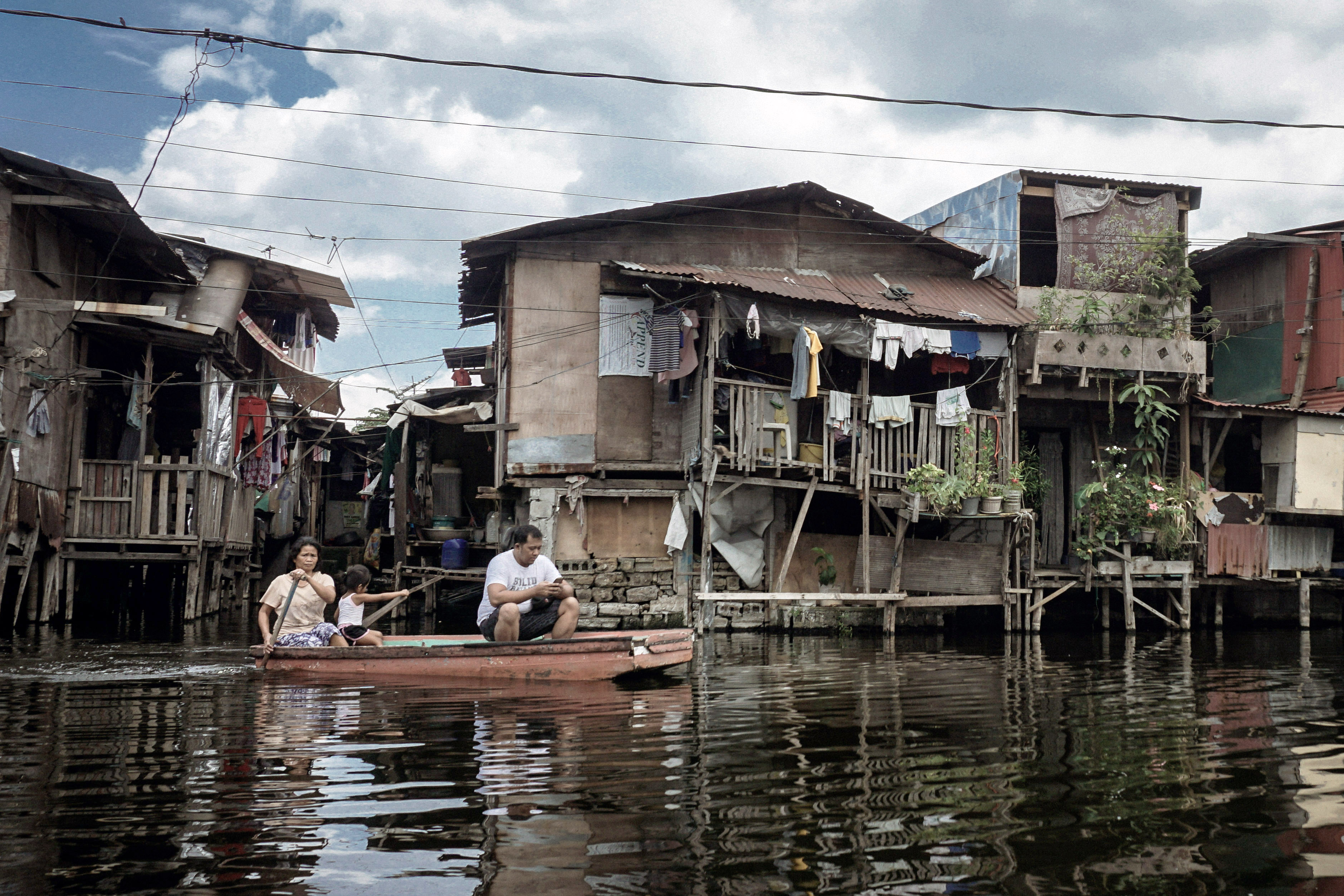
The permanently flooded area at the Artex Compound in Barangay Panghulo

The river system used to be navigable, and fishing was the major livelihood activity in the area. The river used to be wider and deeper with better quality water, and was a regular source of different species of fish, an important food source for local residents. Also, trees and crops like palay (rice) and vegetables used to be grown along the riverbanks. However, these agricultural plots have been replaced by industrial yards, which also became home to thousands of informal settlers who built makeshift dwellings without legal claim to the land. Floods have worsened in recent years, occurring more frequently and reaching depths of several feet. Most affected are families in the communities that are along or near the riverbanks. The river has become narrower and shallower over the years, and its capacity to hold water has decreased. With more frequent intense rains, the riverbanks flood regularly and flooding reaches farther into low-lying and densely populated areas of the city.

=== Climate ===
Climate data for Malabon
Month	Jan	Feb	Mar	Apr	May	Jun	Jul	Aug	Sep	Oct	Nov	Dec	Year
Mean daily maximum °C (°F)	29 (84)	30 (86)	32 (90)	34 (93)	33 (91)	31 (88)	30 (86)	29 (84)	29 (84)	30 (86)	30 (86)	29 (84)	31 (87)
Mean daily minimum °C (°F)	20 (68)	20 (68)	21 (70)	23 (73)	24 (75)	25 (77)	24 (75)	24 (75)	24 (75)	23 (73)	22 (72)	21 (70)	23 (73)
Average precipitation mm (inches)	7 (0.3)	7 (0.3)	9 (0.4)	21 (0.8)	101 (4.0)	152 (6.0)	188 (7.4)	170 (6.7)	159 (6.3)	115 (4.5)	47 (1.9)	29 (1.1)	1,005 (39.7)
Average rainy days	3.3	3.5	11.1	8.1	18.9	23.5	26.4	25.5	24.5	19.6	10.4	6.4	181.2
Source: Meteoblue (modeled/calculated data, not measured locally)

=== Barangays ===
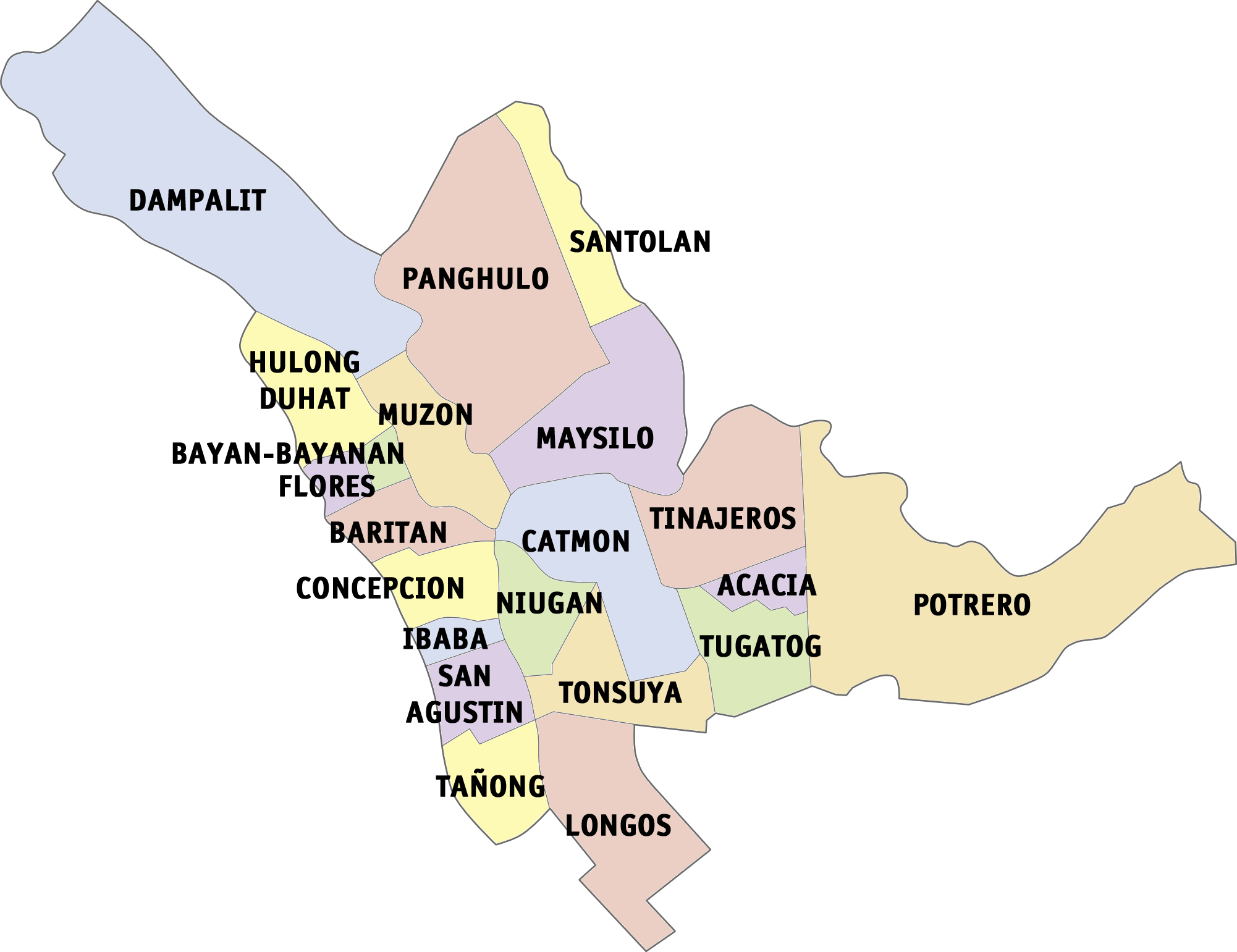
Political map of Malabon

Before the present-day Malabon, the town was originally composed of sitios (barangay) and others were further divided into two or more purok (zone).

Malabon is divided into 21 barangays.

Barangays	District	Population	Area (ha)	Density (/ha)	Zip Code
Baritan	1st	11,476	33.01	347.65	
Bayan-bayanan	1st	7,326	8.46	865.96	
Catmon	1st	36,450	97.77	372.81	1470
Concepcion	1st	11,806	33.97	347.54	
Dampalit	1st	11,245	261.90	42.94	1480
Flores	1st	4,282	9.00	475.78	1471
Hulong Duhat	1st	10,466	56.61	184.88	
Ibaba	1st	7,630	16.56	460.75	1470
Maysilo	1st	11,213	126.53	88.62	1477
Muzon	1st	5,689	49.71	114.44	1479
Niugan	1st	5,936	31.38	189.17	
Panghulo	1st	12,772	121.53	105.09	
San Agustin	1st	11,156	31.59	353.14	
Santulan	1st	15,872	46.85	338.78	1478
Tañong (Poblacion)	1st	14,620	33.83	432.16	
Acacia	2nd	5,735	19.54	293.50	1474
Longos	2nd	48,039	89.99	533.83	1472
Potrero	2nd	41,407	302.71	136.79	1475
Tinajeros	2nd	17,901	84.78	211.15	
Tonsuya	2nd	39,354	59.40	662.53	1473
Tugatog	2nd	22,960	55.40	414.44	

=== Territorial disputes ===
Malabon has an unresolved boundary dispute with Caloocan, wherein both cities claim Caloocan's Barangays 160 and 161, Libis Baesa, (notably the site of North Luzon Expressway's Balintawak Toll Plaza) as within their jurisdiction. In 2025, the Supreme Court of the Philippines dismissed Caloocan's petition questioning the constitutionality of Republic Act No. 9019 (Malabon City Charter), citing it as premature. The Court instead directed both cities to resolve the issue through procedures under the Local Government Code, starting with their respective city councils. Prior to this, in 2014, both city governments signed a memorandum of understanding (MOU) to develop 80 hectares (200 acres) of disputed land located within Caloocan's Libis Baesa area and Malabon's Barangay Potrero. The MOU preempted any court decisions on the dispute that began in 2001, when Malabon, upon its conversion to a highly urbanized city, took control over lands formerly under Caloocan's jurisdiction.

== Demographics ==
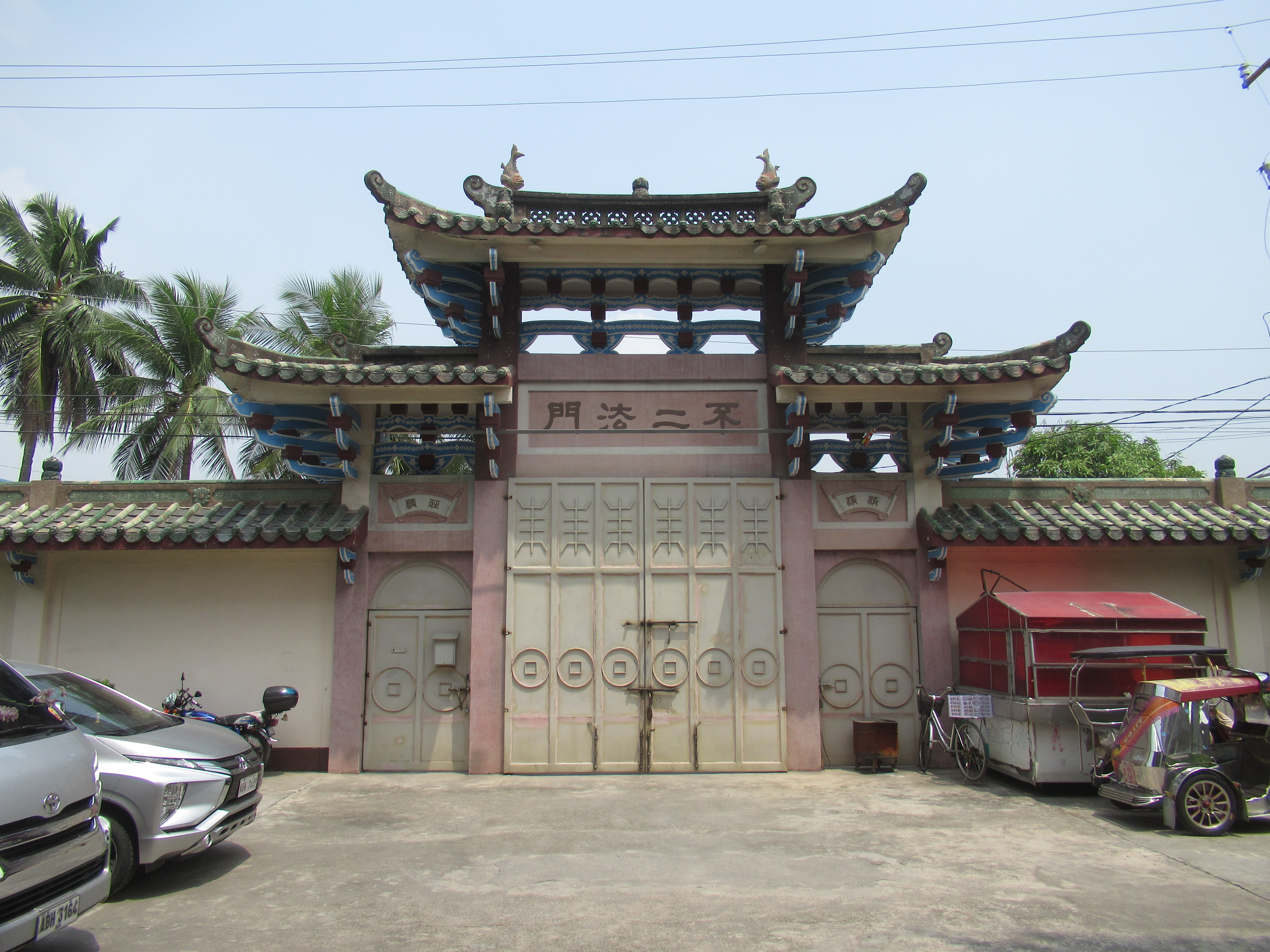
Lian Hua Temple in Potrero

Population census of Malabon

Year	Pop.	±% p.a.
1903	20,136	—
1918	21,695	+0.50%
1939	33,285	+2.06%
1948	46,455	+3.77%
1960	76,438	+4.24%
1970	141,514	+6.35%
1975	174,878	+4.34%
1980	191,001	+1.78%

Year	Pop.	±% p.a.
1990	280,027	+3.90%
1995	347,484	+4.13%
2000	338,855	−0.54%
2007	363,681	+0.98%
2010	353,337	−1.04%
2015	365,525	+0.65%
2020	380,522	+0.85%
2024	389,929	+0.59%

Source: Philippine Statistics Authority

As of the 2024 census, Malabon has a population of 389,929, with a density of 24,820 inhabitants per square kilometre or 64,280 inhabitants per square mile.

=== Demonym ===
Residents of Malabon refer themselves as Malabueño. This term has been officially adopted in the city through City Ordinance No. A11-2025.

=== Language ===
Filipino and English are the Philippine official languages. Filipino, a standardized version of Tagalog, is spoken primarily in Metro Manila.

=== Religion ===
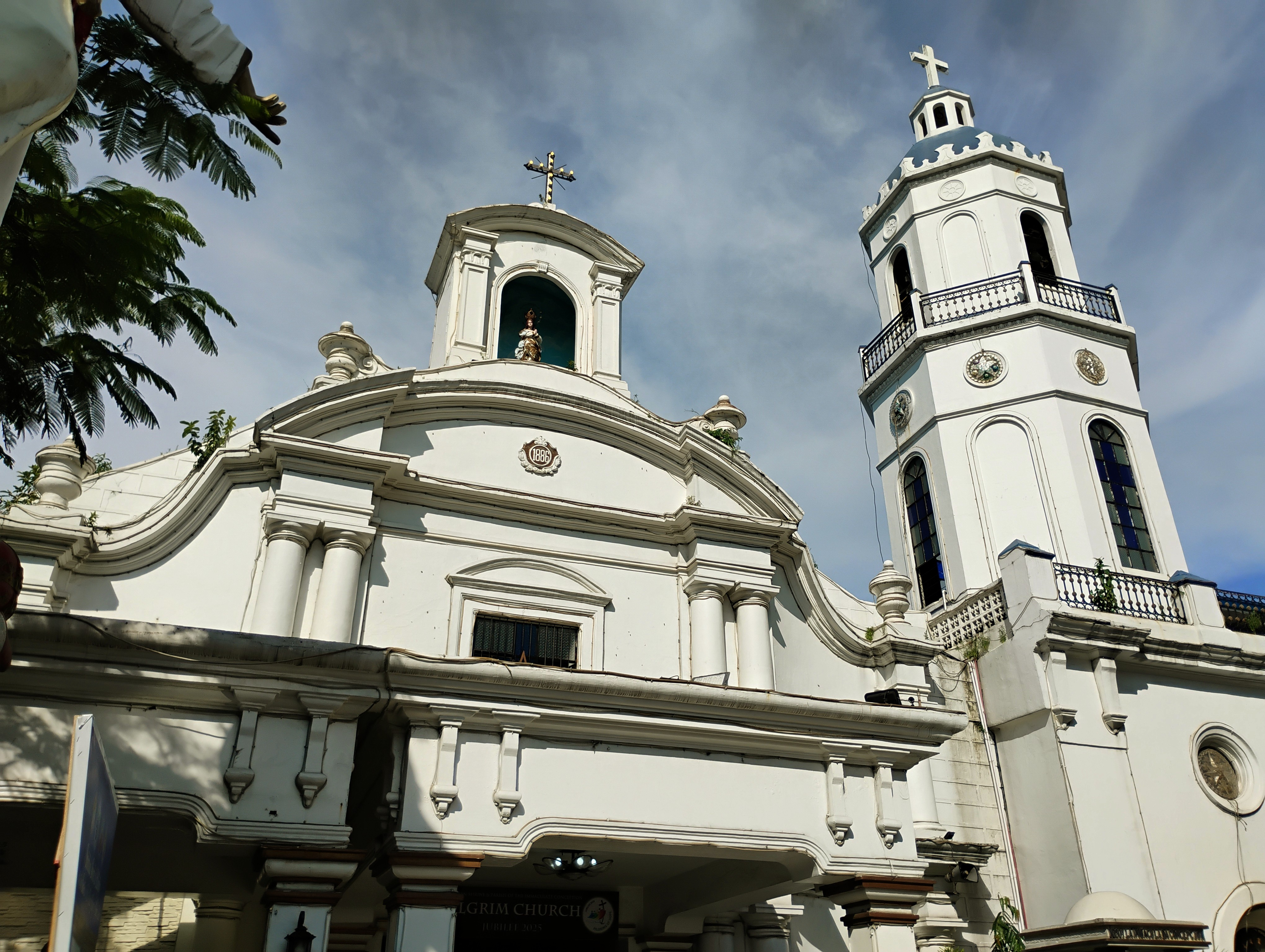
Diocesan Shrine & Parish of Immaculate Conception

Malabon belongs to the Roman Catholic Diocese of Kalookan. Almost 80% of the people here adhere to this religion. Today there are eight Roman Catholic Parishes in Malabon.

Malabon bears the old images of San Bartolome in the Poblacion and the La Inmaculada Concepcion, canonically crowned since 1986 during the pontificate of Pope John Paul II.

Other religions in Malabon include Iglesia Filipina Independiente (belongs to the Diocese of Rizal and Pampanga, Parish of La Purisima Concepcion de Malabon), Baptists, Jesus the Living Stone International Assembly of God, Iglesia ni Cristo, Members of the Church of God International, Jesus Is Lord Church, IEMELIF, Seventh-day Adventist, and Buddhism.

== Economy ==
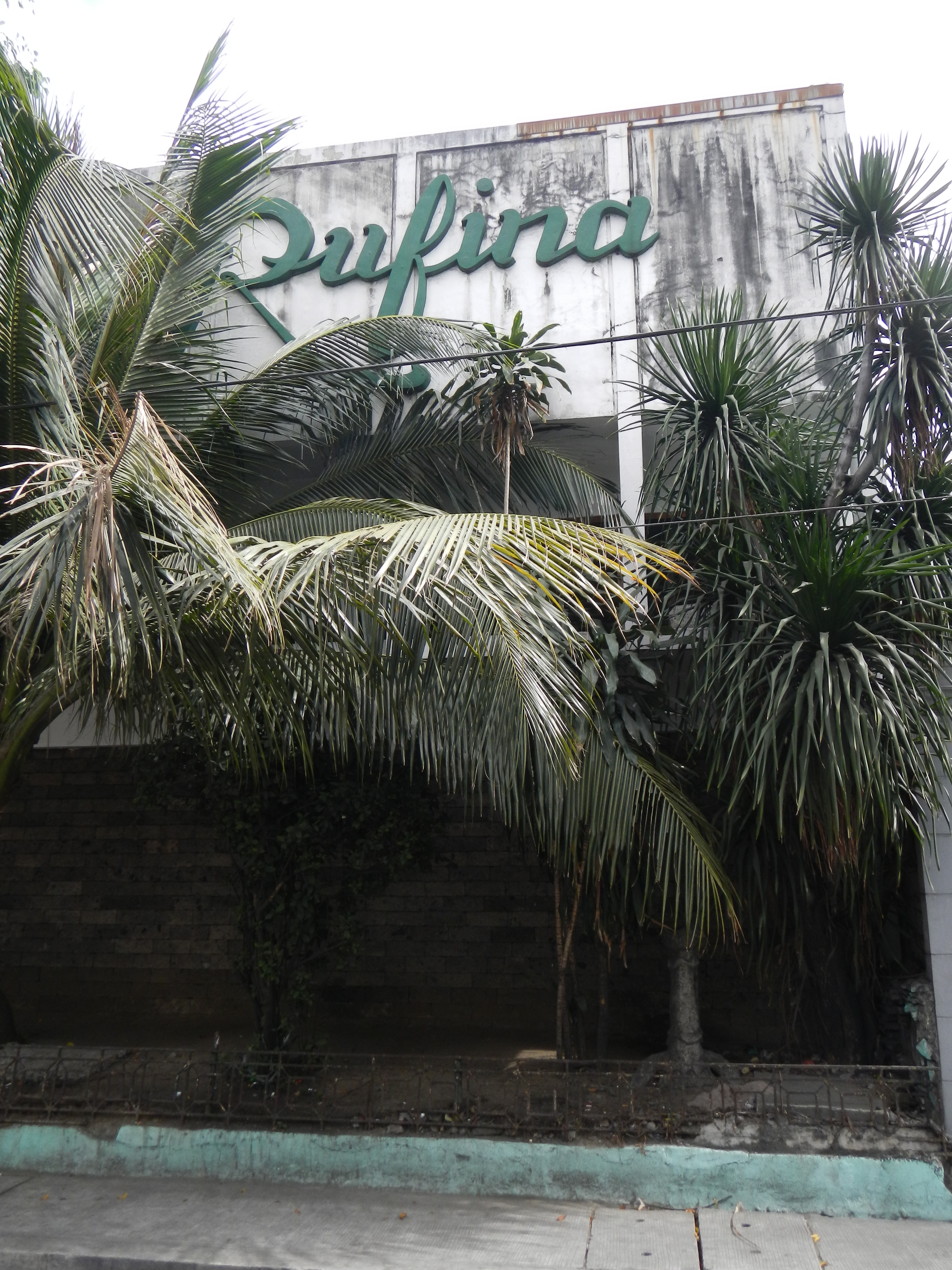
Rufina Patis & Bagoong Factory

Poverty incidence of Malabon (%)

Source: Philippine Statistics Authority

Malabon industries include sugar refinery, patis- (fish sauce) making, cigar-making, candle production, fishing and ilang-ilang flower-extract production (the distilled perfume is exported).

Malabon's economy is experiencing rapid growth, ranking second in the National Capital Region (NCR) with a 7.27% GDP increase in 2024, driven by strong manufacturing, trade, and service sectors. Historically centered on fishing and aquaculture, the city is transforming into a, industrial hub with initiatives focusing on smart city technology, modernization, and sustainable practices, such as plastic upcycling.

== Government ==
=== City hall ===
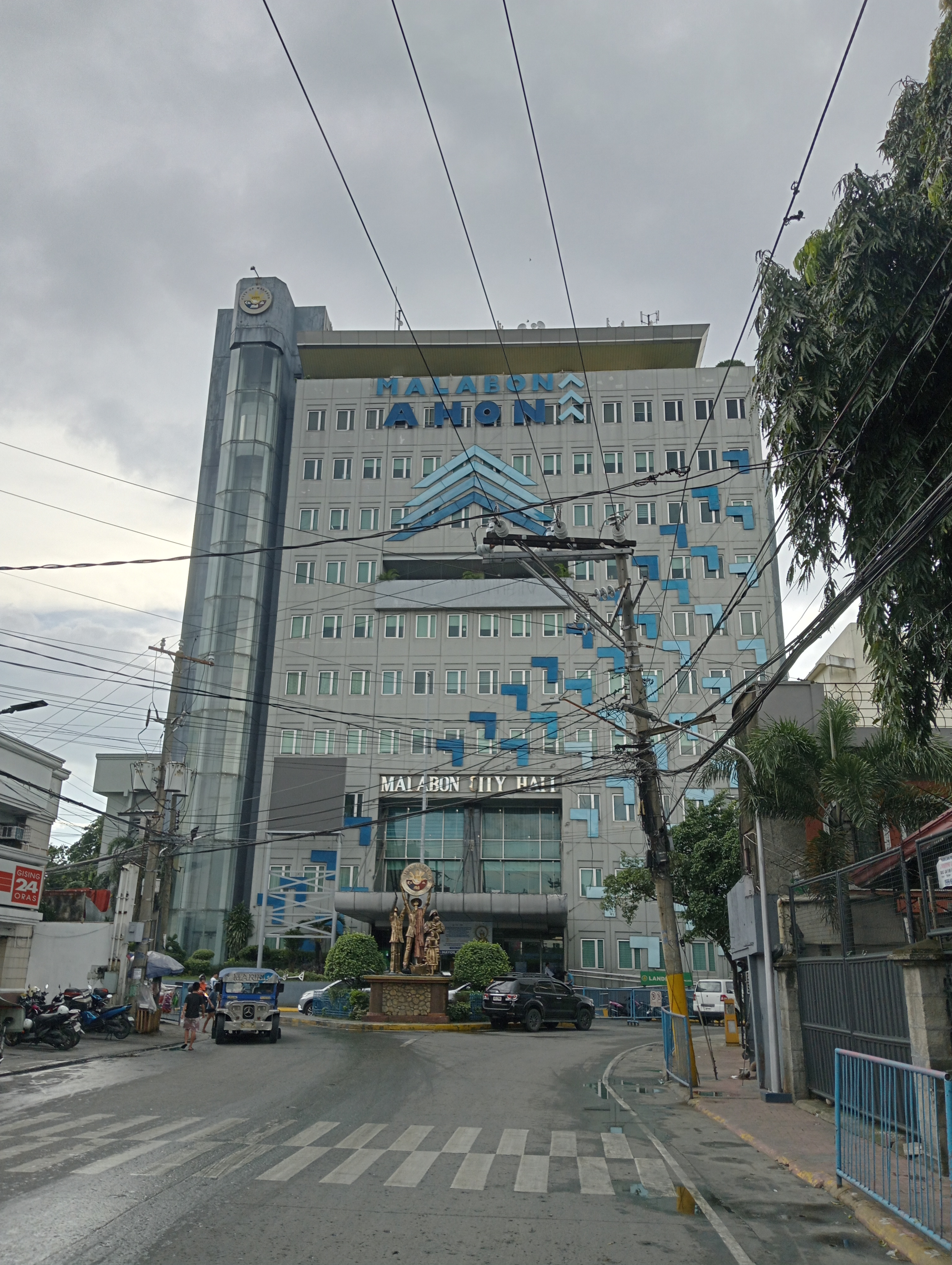
Malabon City Hall, the seat of city government

On April 21, 2008, Malabon's newly constructed 11-story city hall building along F. Sevilla Boulevard in Barangay San Agustin, was inaugurated by Gloria Macapagal Arroyo on Malabon's 7th City anniversary. It was dubbed as a "potential business center of the city," a one-stop shop for government transactions, due to its state-of-the-art facilities such as 3 high-speed elevators and the new city hall building and its offices' "digital system."

=== Elected Officials ===
2025-Present
Name	Party
House of Representatives
Antolin Oreta III	NUP
City Mayor
Jeannie Sandoval	Nacionalista
City Vice Mayor
Edward Nolasco	Lakas
City Councilors
First District
Maricar Torres	Nacionalista
Ian Emmanuel Borja	Nacionalista
Ma. Anna Lizza Yambao	UNA
Paulo Oreta	PMP
Genaro Bernardo	PFP
Payapa Ona	Nacionalista
Second District
Jose Lorenzo Oreta	NUP
Nadja Marie Vicencio	PMP
Jasper Kevin Cruz	Lakas
Edralin Yanga	PFP
Sofronia Lim	NPC
Romualdo Cunanan	PDP
Ex Officio City Council Members
ABC President	Ejercito Aquino (Flores)
SK President	Patrick A. De Guzman (San Agustin)

== Tourism ==
The Malabon City Tourism Office launched the Malabon Tricycle Tours in December 2014. The tours take visitors to eight heritage sites including the newly renovated 400-year-old San Bartolome Church as well as to notable heritage houses like the Raymundo House and Ibaviosa House.

On March 14, 2015, the tours started to offer visitors a unique gastronomic experience through visits to the city's home-based eateries. This culinary aspect was the brainchild of current Mayor Antolin Oreta III's wife Melissa Oreta, the next mayor of Malabon.

The Malabon Zoo and Aquarium, located in Potrero, is a small zoo that features an array of caged animals, along with an aquarium and gardens.

== Culture ==
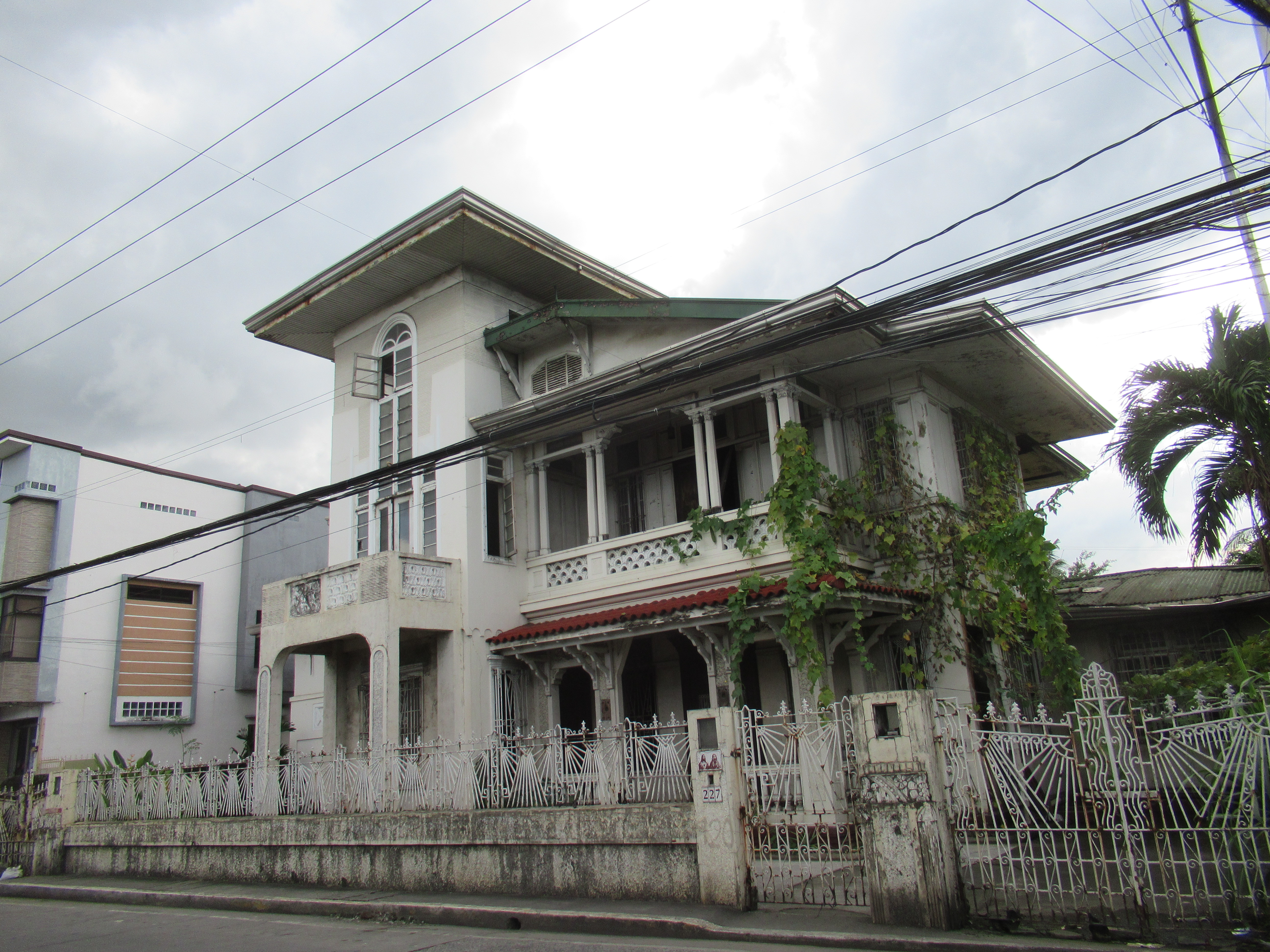
Villongco House

Malabon is considered as the local Venice, due to year-long floods and gradual sinking. It is a place famous for its Pancit Malabon and its predominantly Atlantic ambience. It is also famous for other variety of foods (kakanin), such as puto sulot, puto bumbong, sapin-sapin, broas, bibingka and camachile. The culinary delights are abundant in its specialty eateries.

Its most famous festival is the "Pagoda-Caracol", a fluvial procession with street dancing to commemorate the Feast of the Immaculate Conception every December 8.

=== Heritage houses ===
Malabon houses several old homes of historical value: the Dionisio family home, the Rivera house, the Villongco house, the Luna house, the Pascual house, the Chikiamco house, the Rojas-Borja house, the (Teodoro) Luna house, the Santos-Lapus house, the Pantaleon Bautista house, the Syjuco (formerly Gaza) house, and the Raymundo house, considered to be the oldest located along C. Arellano Street. Other old but well-preserved heritage houses in Malabon include the Asilo de Huérfanos, the Paez House, and the Nepomuceno House.

== Transportation ==
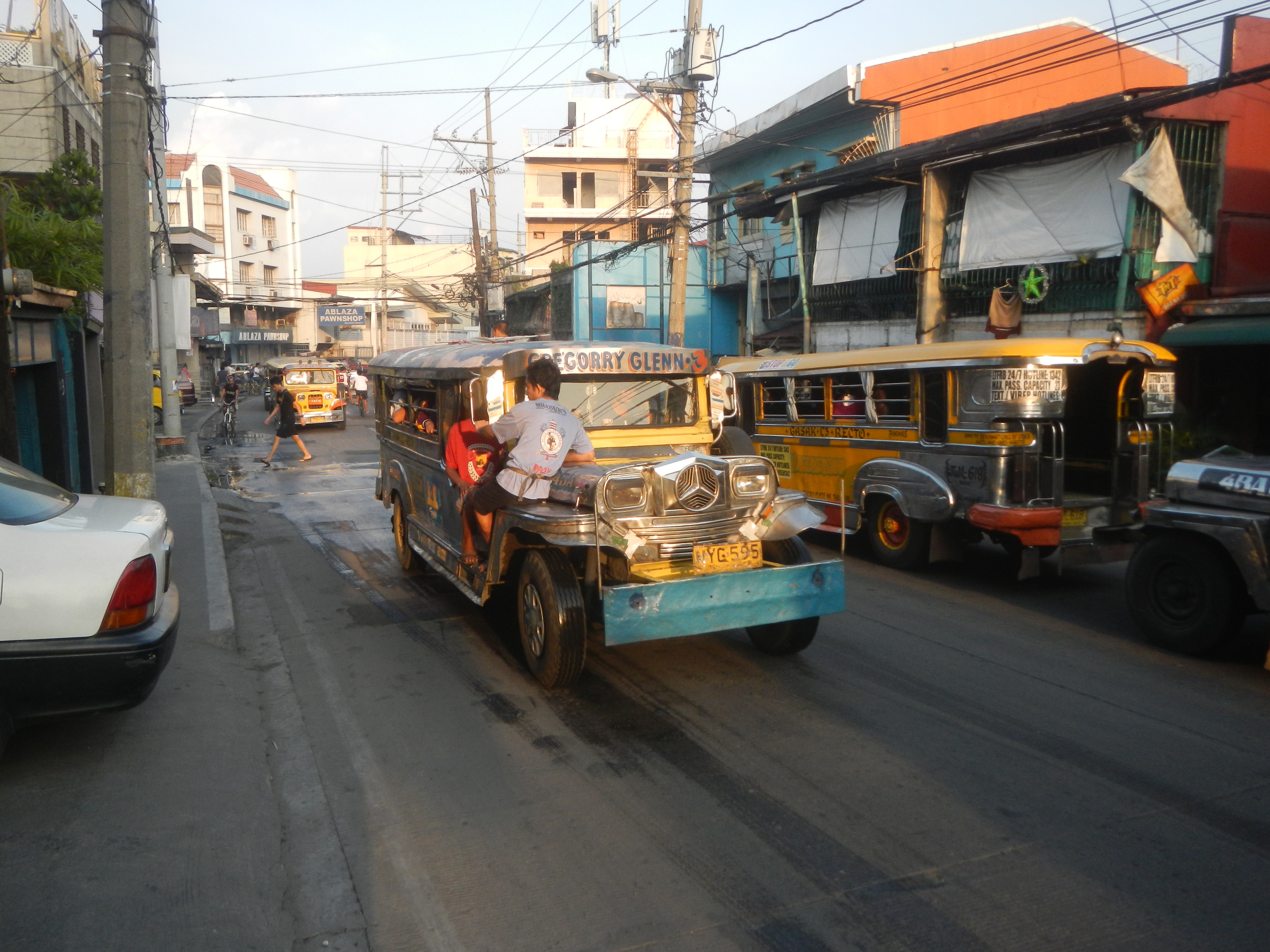
A jeepney plying Paterio Aquino Avenue

There are various modes of transportation that people use to go in and out of the city and to the barangays.

=== Jeepney Routes ===
- Malabon (Hulo) via Acacia Monumento (LRT/Wise) – it traverses the entire length of Gov. Pascual Ave. from Potero to Concepcion, and Gen. Luna St. from Concepcion to Hulong-Duhat. From Monumento, prominent loading/unloading stations are Tuazon, Del Monte, University Ave., Marcelo, Plastikan, Goldendale, Palengke (Acacia-Tinajeros), Robinsons Town Mall Malabon/Francis, Catmon, Gulayan, Niugan, BNR (Muzon), Santo Rosario Village, Arellano University, Concepcion, Ilang-ilang to Javier (Baritan), Celia (Bayan-bayanan), Hulong-Duhat Plaza Terminal. From Hulo, the jeepney takes M. Naval St., right to A. Bonifacio St., left to C. Arellano St. (one way southbound), left to Kalahi St. (before Burgos), left to Gen. Luna St. (one way northbound), and then right back to Gov. Pascual Avenue until it gets to either LRT Victory Mall terminal or Wise terminal in Monumento.
- Malabon (Bayan) via Letre Monumento – it traverses Samson Road in Caloocan, C-4 Road (Longos), P. Aquino Ave. and Rizal Avenue. From Monumento, as it passes the city of Caloocan, loading/unloading stations within Malabon are: Paradise, Letre/MC, Tonsuya, Magsaysay St. and Bayan terminal. To go back, jeeps turn right to Gen. Luna St., left to Sacristia St. (Behind St. James Academy), left to F. Sevilla Blvd. around Malabon City Hall back to Rizal Avenue until it gets to Monumento.
- Malabon (Hulo) via Bayan Navotas – it traverses C. Arellano St. (Malabon), M. Naval St. (Navotas) and Gov. Pascual St. (Navotas). From Hulo, prominent destinations within Malabon are: Badeo Cuatro, Concepcion, Burgos, Camus, Bayan/Palengke then it enters the streets of Navotas traversing M. Naval St. northbound and Gov. Pascual St. southbound.
- Gasak (Hulo) via Agora Ilaya/Divisoria – it traverses C. Arellano St., Leoño St. (Tañong), C-4 Road (Tañong), NBBN Road (Navotas), NBBS Road, Honorio Lopez Blvd. (Manila), Juan Luna St. and Nicolas Zamora St.
- Gasak (Hulo) Recto – from Hulo, it traverses C. Arellano St., Rizal Avenue, P. Aquino Ave., Letre Road, Dagat-dagatan Avenue then it enters the city of Caloocan until it gets to Recto, Manila.
- Sangandaan via Tatawid Polo – it traverses M.H. del Pilar St. from Sangandaan (Caloocan) to Polo (Valenzuela). This route does not begin nor end in Malabon but it serves the people of Malabon from barangay Tugatog, Tinajeros, Maysilo and Tatawid (Santulan).
- Monumento via Tatawid Polo – it traverses Gov. Pascual Ave., then turn right to M.H. del Pilar St. until it gets to Polo (Valenzuela) and back.

=== Ferries ===
Ferry terminals which uses boats include the Badeo Cuatro, connecting Flores to San Roque, Navotas; and Badeo Tres, connecting Concepcion to Daanghari, Navotas.

== Education ==
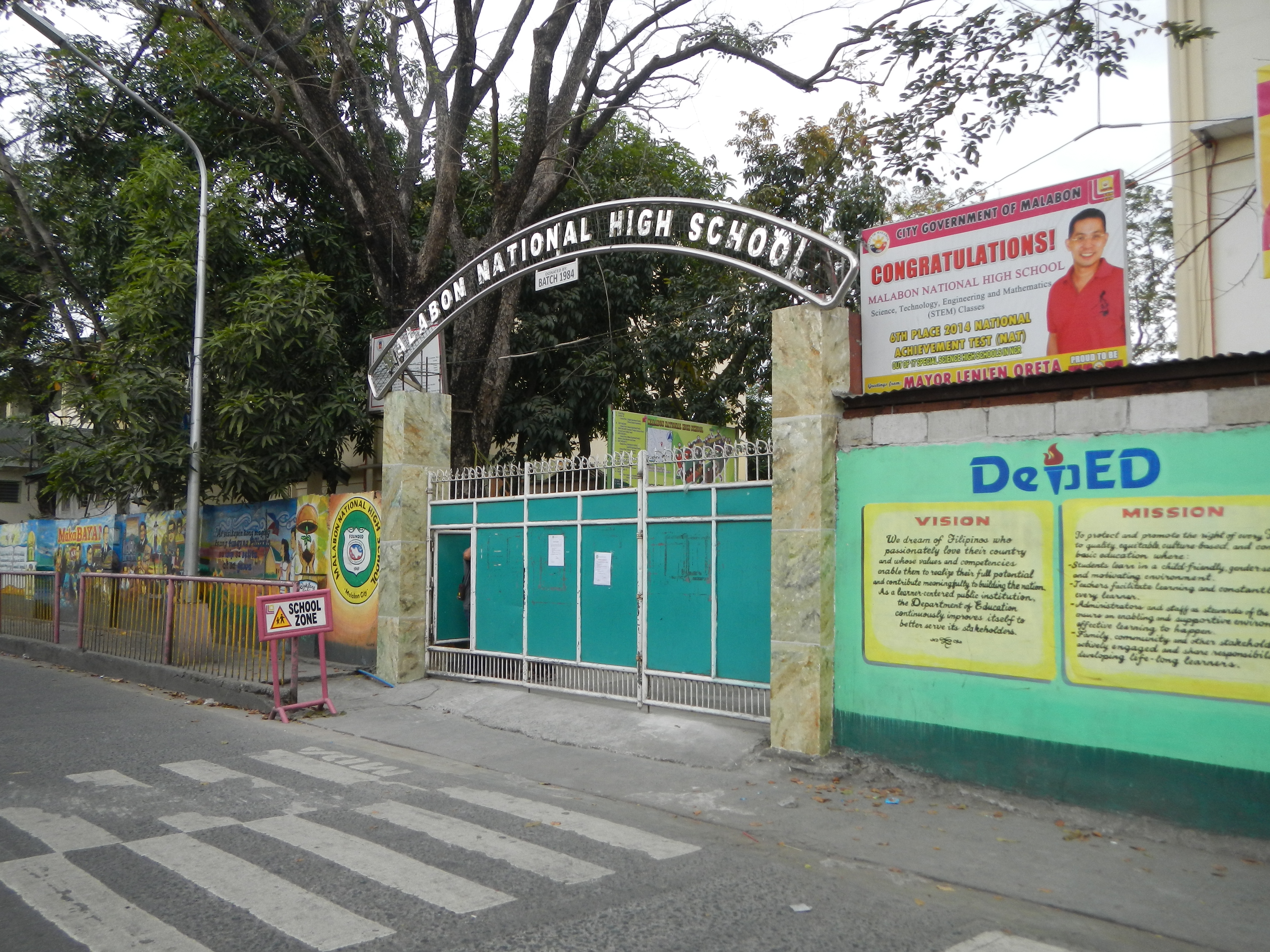
Malabon National High School, the pilot secondary school of the city

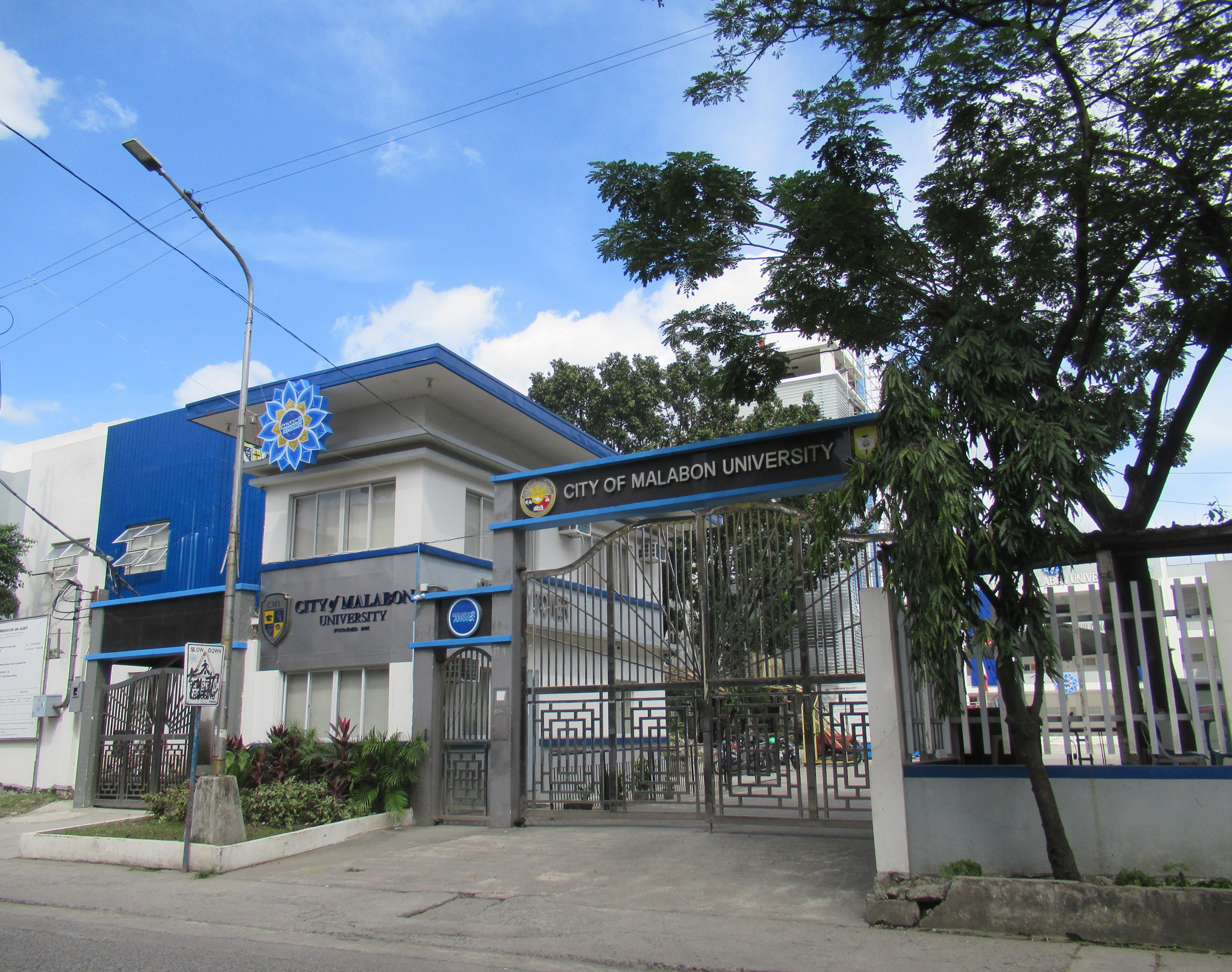
City of Malabon University

=== Tertiary level ===
- The De La Salle Araneta University is the seventh campus of De La Salle Philippines. It was formerly known as the Gregorio Araneta University Foundation which was established in 1946 as the Araneta Institute of Agriculture in Bulacan, then transferred to Malabon the year after. In 1978, it was renamed as the Gregorio Araneta University Foundation. Integration of the university to the DLS System started since 1987 and in 2002 became an official member of the system. The university specializes in Veterinary Medicine and Agricultural Sciences.
  - As an agricultural University – Salikneta Farm (formerly known as Saliksik-Araneta) located at the City of San Jose Del Monte, Bulacan. Its total land area is 64 hectares of farmland originally owned by Gregorio Araneta University Foundation. The wide farmland is used for forestry and agricultural operations for student training purposes. Aside from serving as a laboratory and research facility, an agricultural-forestry-ecology-tourism-integrated farm complete with recreational facilities such as horse back riding, carabao cart-pulling for passengers, fishing, camping, mini-zoo and conference area is envisioned in Salikneta.
- Arellano University–Jose Rizal Campus and Elisa Esguerra Campus, established in 1950, is the fifth campus of Arellano University.
- The City of Malabon University (CMU) is the city university. It is located in Longos, Malabon.
- There are also TESDA-accredited schools in the city. It includes the City of Malabon Polytechnic Institute, St. Michael Arcangel Technological Institute, College of Saint Amatiel, and St. Catherine Institute of Technology

=== Secondary schools ===
- Malabon National High School or MNHS is the pilot secondary school and the most populous school in the city. The school offers three curriculum: Engineering and Science Education Program (ESEP; popularly known as Special Science Class or SSC), Special Program in the Arts (SPA) and the K-to-12 Education Curriulum.
- There are other thirteen public secondary schools in Malabon namely the Malabon National High School and Malabon City National Science and Mathematics High School, Concepcion Technical Vocational School, Tinajeros National High School, Acacia National High School, Santiago Syjuco Memorial Integrated Secondary School, Malabon City TechVoc and Entrepreneurship Senior High School, Ninoy Aquino Senior High School, Panghulo National High School, Potrero National High School, Longos National High School, Tañong National High School, Tugatog National High School, and Imelda Integrated Secondary School.
- There are also a number of private schools in Malabon area such as St. James Academy, Immaculate Conception Academy of Malabon (Formerly Immaculate Conception Parochial School), St. Therese of the Child Jesus Academy, Higher Ground Baptist Academy Foundation Inc, Philippine Malabon Cultural Institute, Seibo College, and PROBEX School.

=== Integrated schools ===
- There are other five public integrated schools in Malabon area such as Dampalit Integrated School, Catmon Integrated School, Col. Ramon Camus Integrated School, Tañong Integrated School, and Tonsuya Integrated School.
- There are also a number of private schools in Malabon area such as The POTTER & The Clay Christian School, Philippine Buddhist Seng Guan Memorial Institute, and St. Michael Learning Center Inc.

=== Elementary schools ===
- There are twenty other public elementary schools in Malabon area such as Malabon Elementary School, Dampalit Elementary School I, Maysilo Elementary School, Panghulo Elementary School Main and I, Santolan Elementary School, Concepcion Elementary School, Santiago Syjuco Memorial School, Dela Paz Elementary School, Amang Rodriguez Elementary School, Tañong Elementary School 1, Longos Elementary School, Ninoy Aquino Elementary School, Epifanio delos Santos Elementary School, Acacia Elementary School, Tinajeros Elementary School, Guillermo Sevilla Sanchez Memorial Elementary School, and Potrero Elementary School Main and I.
- There are also a number of private schools in Malabon area such as Abakadang Kayumanggi Learning Center, Academia De La Lilia, Bright Beginnings Center for Young Children, CEC Berean Christian Academy Inc., Cedar Oaks Christian School Inc., Christian Academy of Malabon, La Cabecera de Montessori, Inc., La Felicidad Learning Center Inc., Labagala's Child Development Center, Learning Journey Child Growth Center, Inc., MFCBC Christian Academy, Inc., Power Minds Learning Center, Sacred Heart School, St. Narciseus Academy Inc., Salazar's School of Learning, Sampedro Children's Learning Center, SME Child Development Center, Inc., T.A.L.K. Learning Center, United Methodist Parish School of Malabon Inc., and White Angel Academy Inc.

== Notable people ==
The city of Malabon is home for famous personalities in different sectors including businessmen, celebrities, politicians, among others.

=== Arts, science, and academia ===
- Benedicto Cabrera – Filipino painter, awarded National Artist of the Philippines
- Linda Ty Casper – Writer, recipient of S.E.A. Write Award.
- Ernesto Domingo – National Scientist of the Philippines for Internal Medicine/ Gastroenterology
- Epifanio de los Santos – Historian and hero
- Erwin Mallari – Filipino watercolor artist
- Ismael Mallari – Literary and art critic in the Philippines
- Nonoy Marcelo – Cartoonist and animator
- CJ de Silva – Known as a "Gifted Child" and a "Promil Kid"
- José Zabala-Santos – Filipino cartoonist
- Ildefonso Santos – renowned poet, educator, one of the earlier translators of Lupang Hinirang
- Ildefonso P. Santos Jr. – pioneer in Philippine landscape architecture, awarded National Artist of the Philippines
- Armida Siguion-Reyna – Filipina singer, film and stage actress, producer and television show host

=== Government, politics and society ===
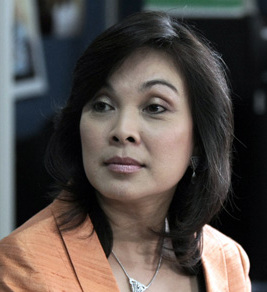
Loren Legarda, Filipino senator and environmentalist was born in Malabon in 1960.
- Jessica Marasigan – Model and former beauty queen who represent Malabon at Binibining Pilipinas 2019
- Ben Tumbling – Notorious Filipino gangster who was the most wanted criminal in Malabon during the mid-1970s until early 1980s.
- Teresa Aquino-Oreta – Former chairperson of the Senate Committee on Education, Arts and Culture in the 11th Congress.
- Benjamin de Jesus – Vicar Apostolic of Jolo from 1992 until his murder in 1997.
- Rafael Crame – Chief of Philippine Constabulary
- Epifanio de los Santos – Historian and hero
- Loren Legarda – Filipino senator and environmentalist
- Janet Lim-Napoles – Businesswoman who is believed to have masterminded the Priority Development Assistance Fund (PDAF) Scam.
- Gregorio Sanciangco – Filipino lawyer and early advocate of economic reforms in the Philippines
- Rolando Santos – bishop of the Roman Catholic Diocese of Alotau-Sideia in Papua New Guinea
- Antolin Oreta III – former city mayor (2012-2022)
- Jeannie Ng-Sandoval – incumbent city mayor
- Federico "Ricky" Sandoval II – former representative
- Canuto "Tito" Oreta – former mayor (2004-2012)
- Renee Co – Lawyer, politician, students' rights activist, and 38th Student Regent of the UP System.

=== Sports and athletics ===
- Nathaniel Padilla – An athlete who won 5 gold medals in rapid pistol event at South East Asian Games 1979, 1983, 1987, 1993, and 2009 he was the son of Tom Ong.
- Jimmy Mariano – Former Olympian and professional basketball player
- Tom Ong – Athlete who competed at the 1972 Summer Olympics and 1976 Summer Olympics

=== Others ===
- Ninong Ry – vlogger and chef
- Joven Tan – songwriter and film director

== Sister cities ==
=== Local ===
- Navotas, Metro Manila
- Parañaque, Metro Manila
- Quezon City, Metro Manila
- Caloocan, Metro Manila
