= Caloocan City Business High School =

- Mataas na Paaralang Pang-Kalakalan ng Lungsod ng Caloocan
- Official Seal

Location
- Sikatuna Ext. Urduja Village Novaliches, Caloocan; Caloocan, Metro Manila; Philippines
- Coordinates: 14°44′37″N 121°2′12″E

Information
- Type: Public School, Business High School, Senior High School
- Motto: Fly High
- Established: 2008
- Grades: 7-12
- Colors: Royal Blue and White
- Newspaper: The Merchant (Official English Publication Of CCBHS); Ang Merkader (Official Campus Newspaper Of CCBHS)
- Principal: Dr. Lilia R. Gundran
- School ID: 319707

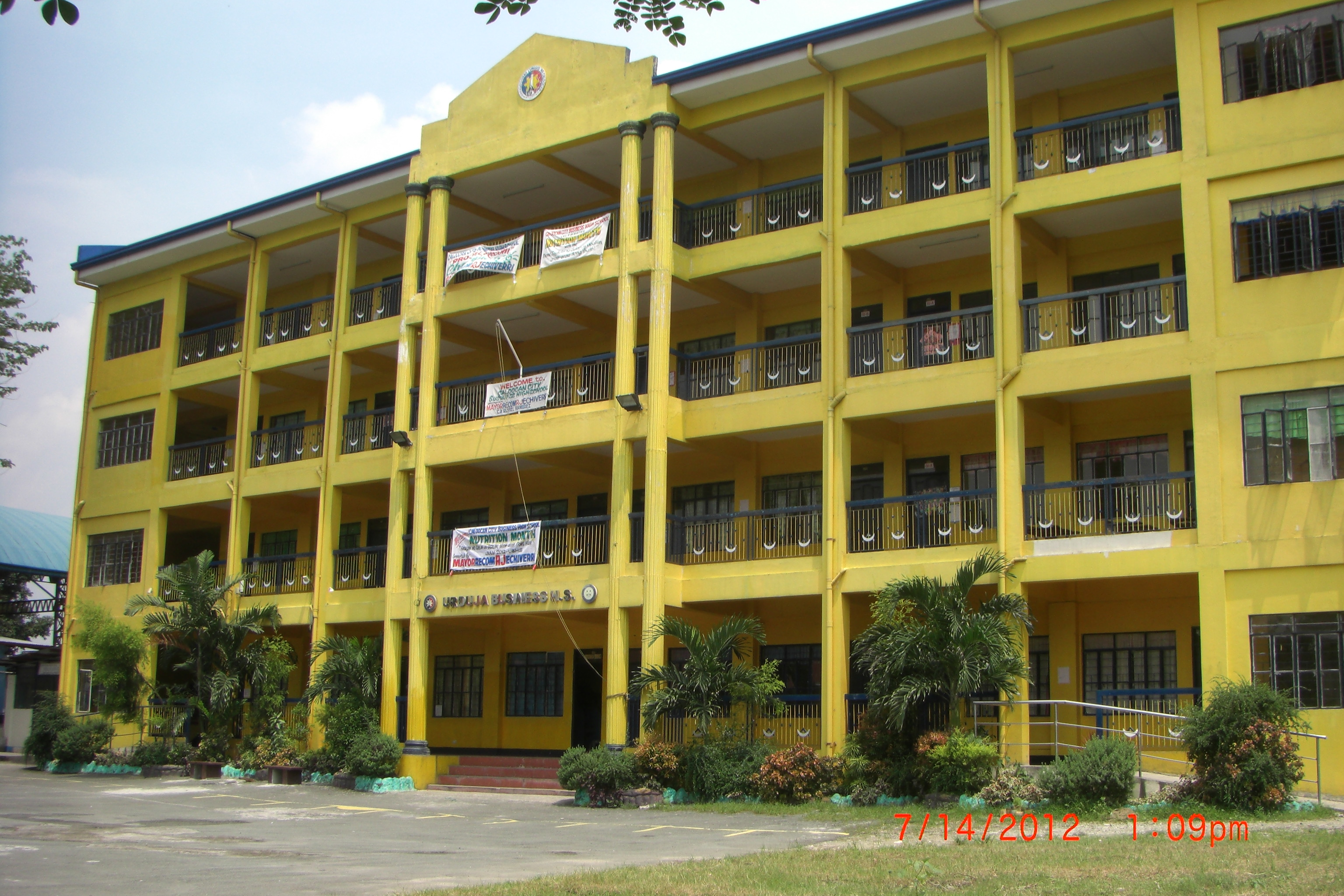
Main building of CCBHS

Caloocan City Business High School (CCBHS) is a business and technical-skills oriented public high school in Caloocan, Metro Manila, Philippines. It offers ABM (Accountancy, Business and Management), HUMSS (Humanities and Social Sciences), STEM (Science, Technology, Engineering, and Mathematics) and TVL (Technical Vocational Livelihood) for Senior High School Students.

Known as Urduja Business High School until 2011, it is located at Sikatuna Ext., Urduja Village, Barangay 172, Caloocan. The school is operated by the local city government.
