= 2010 Caloocan local elections =

12th City and Mayoral elections in Caloocan

2010 Caloocan mayoral elections
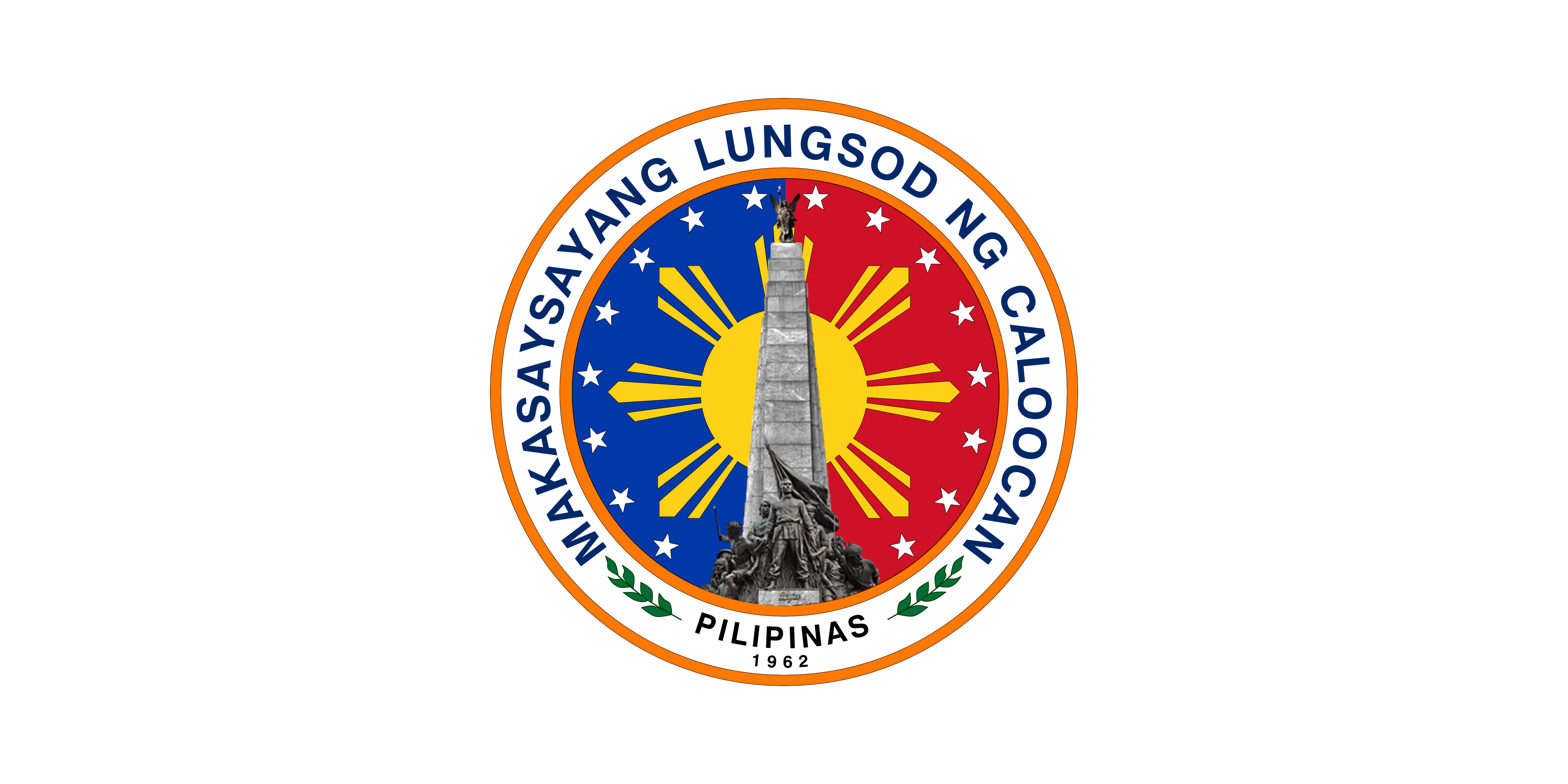
| ← 2007 | May 10, 2010 | 2013 → |
| Nominee | Enrico "Recom" Echiverri | Luis "Baby" Asistio |
| Party | Liberal | NPC |
| Running mate | Edgar "Egay" Erice | Reynaldo "Rey" Malonzo |
| Popular vote | 240,144 | 141,709 |
| Percentage | 62.30% | 36.76% |
Mayor before election
Enrico Echiverri
Liberal
Elected mayor
Enrico Echiverri
Liberal

Local elections were held in Caloocan on May 10, 2010 within the Philippine general election. The voters elected the elective local posts in the city: the mayor, vice mayor, the two Congressmen, and the councilors, six in each of the city's two legislative districts.

== Background ==
Mayor Enrico "Recom" Echiverri was on his second term, and sought re-election for a third and final term. He ran under the Liberal Party. He faced former First District Rep. Luis "Baby" Asistio of Nationalist People's Coalition, and independent Roberto Cordero.

Vice Mayor Luisito "Luis Tito" Varela was term-limited, and he ran for the city's first district. His party chose former Rep. Edgar "Egay" Erice to run for his place. Erice was challenged by former Mayor Reynaldo "Rey" Malonzo of Nationalist People's Coalition, former Mayor Macario "Boy" Asistio Jr. of Pwersa ng Masang Pilipino, Cherry Valega of Kilusang Bagong Lipunan, and independent Mariano Yu.

First District Rep. Oscar "Oca" Malapitan was on second term, sought re-election for third and final term. He faced Vice Mayor Luisito "Luis Tito" Varela of Liberal Party, Ernesto Ray Adalem of Pwersa ng Masang Pilipino, Jaime Regalario of Bangon Pilipinas, and independents Councilor Gualberto "Boy" Bacolod and former Rep. Roberto "Bobby" Guanzon.

Second District Rep. Mary Mitzi "Mitch" Cajayon-Uy was on her first term, and she ran for re-election for a second term. She was challenged by Antonio Almeda of Nacionalista, Carlos Cabochan of Ang Kapatiran, John Santos of Liberal Party, Adoracion Garcia of PGRP, and independents councilor Ma. Milagros "Rose" Mercado, Tany Catacutan, and Enrique Cube.

== Results ==
=== For Mayor ===
Mayor Enrico "Recom" Echiverri defeated his closest rival, former First District Rep. Luis "Baby" Asistio.

Caloocan Mayoral Elections
| Party | Candidate | Votes | % |
|---|---|---|---|
| Liberal | Enrico "Recom" Echiverri | 240,144 | 62.30 |
| NPC | Luis Asistio | 141,709 | 36.76 |
| Independent | Roberto Cordero | 3,641 | 0.94 |
| Valid ballots | | 385,494 | 93.58 |
| Invalid or blank votes | | 8,145 | 6.42 |
| Total votes | | 411,952 | 100.00 |
| Liberal hold | | | |

=== For Vice Mayor ===
Former Second District Rep. Edgar "Egay" Erice won over his closest rival, former Mayor Reynaldo "Rey" Malonzo.

Caloocan Vice Mayoral Elections
| Party | Candidate | Votes | % |
|---|---|---|---|
| Liberal | Edgar "Egay" Erice | 180,379 | 49.50 |
| NPC | Reynaldo Malonzo | 100,089 | 27.46 |
| PMP | Macario Asistio, Jr. | 68,228 | 18.72 |
| KBL | Cherry Vallega | 12,986 | 3.56 |
| Independent | Mariano Yu | 2,748 | 0.75 |
| Valid ballots | | 364,430 | 88.46 |
| Invalid or blank votes | | 47,522 | 11.54 |
| Total votes | | 372,146 | 100.00 |
| Liberal hold | | | |

=== For Representatives ===
==== First District ====
Rep. Oscar "Oca" Malapitan won with a huge margin over his closest rival, Vice Mayor Luisito "Luis Tito" Varela.

Congressional Elections in Caloocan's First District
| Party | Candidate | Votes | % |
|---|---|---|---|
| Nacionalista | Oscar "Oca" Malapitan | 163,150 | 60.21 |
| Liberal | Luis Tito Varela | 48,333 | 17.84 |
| Independent | Roberto Guanzon | 12,112 | 4.47 |
| PMP | Ernesto Ray Adalem | 10,444 | 3.85 |
| Independent | Gualberto Bacolod | 8,026 | 2.96 |
| Bangon Pilipinas | Jaime Regalario | 2,866 | 1.06 |
| Valid ballots | | 244,931 | 90.39 |
| Invalid or blank votes | | 26,045 | 9.61 |
| Total votes | | 270,976 | 100.00 |
| Nacionalista hold | | | |

==== Second District ====
Rep. Mary Mitzi "Mitch" Cajayon-Uy won over her closest rival, Antonio Almeda.

Congressional Elections in Caloocan's Second District
| Party | Candidate | Votes | % |
|---|---|---|---|
| Lakas | Mary Mitzi "Mitch" Cajayon-Uy | 77,364 | 48.97 |
| Nacionalista | Antonio Almeda | 35,546 | 22.50 |
| Ang Kapatiran | Carlos Cabochan | 16,943 | 10.72 |
| Independent | Ma. Milagros "Rose" Mercado | 13,306 | 8.42 |
| Liberal | John C. Santos | 1,336 | 0.85 |
| Independent | Tany Catacutan | 723 | 0.46 |
| PGRP | Adoracion Garcia | 304 | 0.19 |
| Independent | Enrique Cube | 217 | 0.14 |
| Valid ballots | | 145,739 | 92.25 |
| Invalid or blank votes | | 12,246 | 7.75 |
| Total votes | | 157,985 | 100.00 |
| Lakas–Kampi hold | | | |

=== For Councilors ===
The voters in the city are set to elect six councilors on the district where they are living, hence registered. Candidates are voted separately so there are chances where winning candidates will have unequal number of votes and may come from different political parties.

==== Summary ====
| Party | Votes | % | Seats |
|---|---|---|---|
| Liberal Party | 1,050,391 | 51.05 | 10 |
| Nacionalista Party | 374,495 | 18.20 | 1 |
| Lakas Kampi CMD | 176,187 | 8.56 | 0 |
| Nationalist People's Coalition | 138,113 | 6.71 | 0 |
| Pwersa ng Masang Pilipino | 77,389 | 3.76 | 1 |
| Ang Kapatiran | 18,681 | 0.91 | 0 |
| Kilusang Bagong Lipunan | 2,420 | 0.12 | 0 |
| Independent | 219,748 | 10.68 | 0 |
| Ex officio seats | | | 2 |
| Total | 2,057,424 | 100.00 | 14 |
| Total votes | 432,895 | – | |

==== First District ====
City Council Elections in Caloocan's First District
| Party | Candidate | Votes | % |
|---|---|---|---|
| Nacionalista | Dale Gonzalo "Along" Malapitan | 132,123 | 10.38 |
| Liberal | Susana Punzalan | 130,461 | 10.24 |
| Liberal | Nora Nubla | 130,284 | 10.23 |
| Liberal | Dante Prado | 116,182 | 9.18 |
| Liberal | Ramon Te | 109,139 | 8.57 |
| Liberal | Andres Mabagos | 79,965 | 6.28 |
| Liberal | Roberto Cruz | 79,676 | 6.26 |
| NPC | Henry Camayo | 75,237 | 5.91 |
| Nacionalista | Andrew Asistio | 73,914 | 5.18 |
| Nacionalista | Isaac Domingo | 72,529 | 5.69 |
| NPC | Ireneo "Nonoy" Cayetano | 62,876 | 4.94 |
| Independent | Juan Antonio Trillanes | 47,044 | 3.69 |
| Lakas–Kampi | Cenon Mayor | 42,031 | 3.30 |
| Nacionalista | Crispin Peña, Sr. | 24,556 | 1.93 |
| Independent | Joseph Aquino | 18,253 | 1.43 |
| Independent | Cristina Guino-o | 16,951 | 1.33 |
| Independent | Rodolfo Gonzaga | 9,097 | 0.71 |
| Independent | Leonardo Dela Cruz | 8,745 | 0.69 |
| Independent | Emmanuel Cruz | 6,910 | 0.54 |
| Independent | Oscar Benedict Vallejo | 6,308 | 0.50 |
| Independent | Jimmy Sanchez | 5,686 | 0.45 |
| Independent | Rasty Benson | 4,426 | 0.35 |
| Independent | Fernando Vinoya | 4,336 | 0.34 |
| Independent | Germel Perit | 2,670 | o.21 |
| Independent | Amy Rabas | 2,621 | 0.21 |
| Independent | Jesus Budac, Jr. | 2,614 | 0.21 |
| Independent | Virgilio Luzares | 2,547 | 0.20 |
| Independent | Garth Gollayan | 2,227 | 0.17 |
| Independent | Jamin Tulbo | 1,971 | 0.15 |
| Independent | Loney Sapdin | 1,535 | 0.12 |
| Total votes | | 270,976 | 100.00 |

==== Second District ====
City Council Elections in Caloocan's Second District
| Party | Candidate | Votes | % |
|---|---|---|---|
| Liberal | Carolyn Cunanan | 82,471 | 10.51 |
| PMP | Macario "Maca" Asistio III | 77,389 | 9.86 |
| Liberal | Tolentino Bagus | 76,359 | 9.73 |
| Liberal | Luis Chito Abel | 74,933 | 9.55 |
| Liberal | Allen Alexander Aruelo | 72,936 | 9.30 |
| Liberal | Marjorie Barretto | 49,911 | 6.36 |
| Liberal | Arnold Divina | 48,074 | 6.13 |
| Lakas–Kampi | Joseph Timbol | 37,154 | 4.74 |
| Lakas–Kampi | Norlando Divina | 34,226 | 4.36 |
| Lakas–Kampi | Roberto Samson | 33,433 | 4.26 |
| Independent | Jerrboy Mauricio | 26,690 | 3.40 |
| Nacionalista | Marc Merville Orozco | 20,315 | 2.59 |
| Ang Kapatiran | Alvin Abelardo | 18,681 | 2.38 |
| Lakas–Kampi | Ronald Romero | 16,668 | 2.12 |
| Nacionalista | Nestor Samson | 16,658 | 2.12 |
| Independent | Roehl Nadurata | 14,925 | 1.90 |
| Nacionalista | Roseller Arcadio | 14,594 | 1.86 |
| Independent | Jaime Mataragnon, Sr. | 13,197 | 1.68 |
| Lakas–Kampi | Trinidad Repuno | 12,675 | 1.62 |
| Nacionalista | Serafico Placer | 11,196 | 1.43 |
| Nacionalista | Joseph Ariestotle Mapue | 8,610 | 1.10 |
| Independent | Jose Isagani Gonzales | 4,740 | 0.60 |
| Independent | Melvin Louie Manalaysay | 4,698 | 0.60 |
| Independent | Tito Herminio Diño | 4,520 | 0.58 |
| Independent | Robert Lee Vitug | 4,401 | 0.56 |
| Independent | Arlan Gurnot | 2,636 | 0.34 |
| KBL | Romeo Luz, Jr. | 2,420 | 0.31 |
| Total votes | | 161,919 | 100.00 |

== Note ==
Former Rep. Luis "Baby" Asistio was initially barred by the Supreme Court. MTC Branch 52 Judge Arthur Malabaguio, in a 14-page decision dated Feb. 5, a copy of which was obtained by The STAR, said Asistio uses fictitious addresses and “his exclusion from the list of voters is deemed proper.” After few weeks, the Supreme Court allowed the former representative to run for mayor of the city after a disqualification order was nullified. SC spokesman Jose Midas Marquez said the Court en banc session issued the status quo order in favor of Asistio. The status quo order was to stop the implementation of the Calooocan MTC's ruling to remove Asistio’s name from the voters’ list.
