= Retiring and term-limited incumbents in the 2022 Philippine House of Representatives elections =

Philippine House of Representatives election

These are term limited and retiring members of the House of Representatives of the Philippines during the 18th Congress of the Philippines, who cannot or would not run in the 2022 elections.

In the Philippines, members of the House of Representatives cannot serve more than four consecutive terms. Term limited members are prohibited from running in the 2022 elections; they may run for any other positions, or may wait until the 2025 elections, or in a special election.

== Summary ==
There are 304 seats in the House of Representatives' delegation to the outgoing 18th Congress of the Philippines, of which 67 of these are open seats, with an additional five vacancies that have not been filled up due to lack of special elections.

Party	Term-limited	Retiring	Total open seats
Aksyon	1	1	2
Lakas	1	3	4
LDP	1	0	1
Liberal	2	0	2
Nacionalista	11	6	15
NPC	6	6	12
NUP	8	3	11
PDP–Laban	13	7	21
PRP	1	0	1
Local parties	1	2	2
Independent	0	1	1
Party-lists	5	6	11
Total	48	35	83

== Term-limited members ==
These are on their third consecutive term already and cannot run for reelection.

=== Aksyon incumbents ===
1. Edgar Erice (Caloocan–2nd), running for mayor of Caloocan
  By July 2021, it was rumored that Erice was likely to run for mayor of Caloocan. Days later, Erice announced that he would indeed run for mayor.

=== Lakas incumbents ===
1. Fredenil Castro (Capiz–2nd), running for governor of Capiz

=== LDP incumbents ===
1. Rodrigo Abellanosa (Cebu City–2nd)
  By March 2020, Abellanosa was said to be eyeing to run for mayor of Cebu City, or not run in 2022. Over a year later, Bando Osmeña – Pundok Kauswagan (BO-PK) was reportedly eyeing him to either run for mayor or vice mayor. Abellanosa ultimately was not included in BO-PK's local slate.

=== Liberal incumbents ===
1. Kit Belmonte (Quezon City–6th)
2. Francis Gerald Abaya (Cavite–1st)
3. Isagani Amatong (Zamboanga del Norte–3rd)

=== Mindoro Bago Sarili incumbents ===
1. Paulino Salvador Leachon (Oriental Mindoro–1st), running for governor of Oriental Mindoro

=== Nacionalista incumbents ===
1. Raneo Abu (Batangas–2nd)
2. Sol Aragones (Laguna–3rd), running for governor of Laguna
3. Abdulmunir Mundoc Arbison (Sulu–2nd)
4. Mercedes Cagas (Davao del Sur)
5. Eileen Ermita-Buhain (Batangas–1st)
  Ermita-Buhain is retiring.
6. Jun Chipeco Jr. (Calamba)
7. Lawrence Fortun (Agusan del Norte–1st), running for vice mayor of Butuan
8. Jeffrey Khonghun (Zambales–1st), mayor of Castillejos, Zambales
9. Jose I. Tejada (Cotabato–3rd)

=== NPC incumbents ===
1. Erico Aristotle Aumentado (Bohol–2nd), running for governor of Bohol
  It was speculated that Aumentado would run for governor of Bohol, while his wife sought to replace him as congressman from the third district. Aumentado did file to run for governor, and his wife also filed for the House seat he is term-limited as representative.
2. Cheryl Deloso-Montalla (Zambales–2nd), running for governor of Zambales
3. Abdullah Dimaporo (Lanao del Norte–2nd)
4. Evelina Escudero (Sorsogon–1st)
5. Angelina Tan (Quezon–4th), running for governor of Quezon
  In April 2021, Tan said that she was "99.99% ready" to run for governor of Quezon. She indeed ended up running for governor.
6. Noel Villanueva (Tarlac–3rd), running for mayor of Concepcion, Tarlac

=== NUP incumbents ===
1. Alex Advincula (Cavite–3rd), running for mayor of Imus, Cavite
2. Franz Alvarez (Palawan–1st)
3. Wilfredo Caminero (Cebu–2nd), running for mayor of Argao, Cebu
4. Leo Rafael Cueva (Negros Occidental–2nd), running for mayor of Sagay, Negros Occidental
5. Luis Ferrer IV (Cavite–6th), running for mayor of General Trias, Cavite
6. Gavini Pancho (Bulacan–2nd)
7. Abraham Tolentino (Cavite–8th), running for mayor of Tagaytay, Cavite
8. Juliette Uy (Misamis Oriental–2nd), running for governor of Misamis Oriental
9. Rolando Uy (Cagayan de Oro–1st), running for mayor of Cagayan de Oro
  By January 2020, Uy was seen as a leading candidate for mayor of Cagayan de Oro if he ran. Uy did file to run for mayor.

=== PDP–Laban incumbents ===
1. Benjamin Agarao Jr. (Laguna–4th), running for mayor of Santa Cruz, Laguna
2. Rose Marie Arenas (Pangasinan–3rd)
  Arenas is not running in 2022.
3. Ferdinand Hernandez (South Cotabato–2nd), running for governor of South Cotabato
4. Dulce Ann Hofer (Zamboanga Sibugay–2nd), running for governor of Zamboanga Sibugay
5. Elisa Olga Kho (Masbate–2nd), running for vice governor of Masbate
6. Eric Olivarez (Parañaque–1st), running for mayor of Parañaque
7. Xavier Jesus Romualdo (Camiguin), running for governor of Camiguin
8. Estrellita Suansing (Nueva Ecija–1st)
9. Lucy Torres (Leyte–4th), running for mayor of Ormoc
  Torres was originally rumored to run for senator. However, she and her husband Ormoc mayor Richard Gomez's local organization announced that she is running for mayor, and he for the open congressional seat.
10. Alfred Vargas (Quezon City–5th). running for councilor of Quezon City from the fifth district
  Vargas did not continue his run for the Senate, and was originally planning to return to private life after his third term ends. His brother, Quezon City councilor Patrick Michael, is running for the open seat in his place. He later changed his mind, running for Quezon City councilor.
11. Ronaldo Zamora (San Juan)
  San Juan Mayor Francis Zamora said that his father would "be retiring definitely".

=== PRP incumbents ===
1. Rogelio Neil Roque (Bukidnon–4th), running for governor of Bukidnon

=== Party-list incumbents ===
1. Lito Atienza (Buhay), running for vice president of the Philippines.
2. Conrado Estrella III (Abono)
3. Rico Geron (AGAP)
4. Joseph Stephen Paduano (Abang Lingkod)
5. Carlos Isagani Zarate (Bayan Muna)

== Retiring incumbents ==
These were allowed defend their seats, but chose not to:

=== Aksyon incumbents ===
1. Esmael Mangudadatu (Maguindanao–2nd), running for governor of Maguindanao

=== Asenso Manileño incumbents ===
1. Yul Servo (Manila–3rd), running for vice mayor of Manila

=== Independent incumbents ===
1. Alan Peter Cayetano (Taguig-Pateros–1st), running for senator

=== Lakas incumbents ===
1. Mikey Arroyo (Pampanga–2nd)
  Arroyo is retiring.
2. Ramon Guico III (Pangasinan–5th), running for governor of Pangasinan
3. Wilter Palma II, (Zamboanga Sibugay–1st) running for governor of Zamboanga Sibugay

=== Nacionalista incumbents ===
1. Braeden John Biron (Iloilo–4th), running for mayor of Dumangas, Iloilo
2. Lani Cayetano (Taguig–2nd), running for mayor of Taguig
3. Eduardo Gullas (Cebu–1st)
  Gullas is retiring from politics.
4. Corazon Nuñez Malanyaon (Davao Oriental–1st), running for governor of Davao Oriental
5. Vilma Santos (Batangas–6th)
  Vilma Santos was eyed to run for president by the 1Sambayan convenors' group, but she declined. Her husband, Senator Ralph Recto, said on 2021 that he was mulling to swap positions with her. Recto did file to run for Santos's open seat. In her Facebook post, she announced that she no longer ran for's any elective positions.
6. Frederick Siao (Iligan), running for mayor of Iligan

=== Navoteño incumbents ===
1. John Rey Tiangco (Navotas), running for mayor of Navotas

=== NPC incumbents ===
1. Lorna Bautista-Bandigan (Davao Occidental), running for vice governor of Davao Occidental
2. Bayani Fernando (Marikina–1st), mayor of Marikina
3. Josal Fortuno (Camarines Sur–5th)
  Not running in 2022.
4. Weslie Gatchalian (Valenzuela–1st), running for mayor of Valenzuela
5. Loren Legarda (Antique), running for senator.
6. Dahlia Loyola (Cavite–5th), running for mayor of Carmona, Cavite.

=== NUP incumbents ===
1. Narciso Bravo Jr. (Masbate–1st), running for governor of Masbate
2. Strike Revilla (Cavite–2nd), running for mayor of Bacoor, Cavite

=== PDP–Laban incumbents ===
1. Angelica Amante (Agusan del Norte–2nd), running for governor of Agusan del Norte
2. Shirlyn Banas-Nograles (South Cotabato–1st), running for mayor of General Santos
3. Ruffy Biazon (Muntinlupa), running for mayor of Muntinlupa
  Biazon is running under the One Muntinlupa local party.
4. Joet Garcia (Bataan–2nd), running for governor of Bataan
5. Dale Malapitan (Caloocan–1st), running for mayor of Caloocan
6. Rogelio Pacquiao (Sarangani), running for governor of Sarangani
7. Joy Tambunting (Parañaque–2nd)
  Tambunting is not running in 2022.
8. Sharee Ann Tan (Samar–2nd), running for governor of Samar

=== Party-list incumbents ===
For party-list incumbents, they are expected to serve out their terms unless expelled by their parties or they resign, as they are not able to run under their party-list's name in non-party-list elections.

1. Eufemia Cullamat (Bayan Muna)
  Cullamat did not seek a second term.
2. Mike Defensor (Anakalusugan), running for mayor of Quezon City
  Defensor is running under the Partido Federal ng Pilipinas.
3. Alfredo Garbin Jr. (Ako Bicol), running for mayor of Legazpi, Albay
  Garbin was nominated by the Nationalist People's Coalition and Lakas–CMD.
4. Sarah Elago (Kabataan)
  Elago is retiring since she reached the age limit of 30 for youth sector representatives.
5. Rodante Marcoleta (SAGIP), running for senator
  Marcoleta is running under PDP–Laban.
6. Jose Singson Jr. (Probinsyano Ako), running for mayor of Vigan, Ilocos Sur
  Singson is running under the Nationalist People's Coalition.
