= 2013 Caloocan local elections =

13th City and Mayoral elections in Caloocan

2013 Caloocan mayoral elections
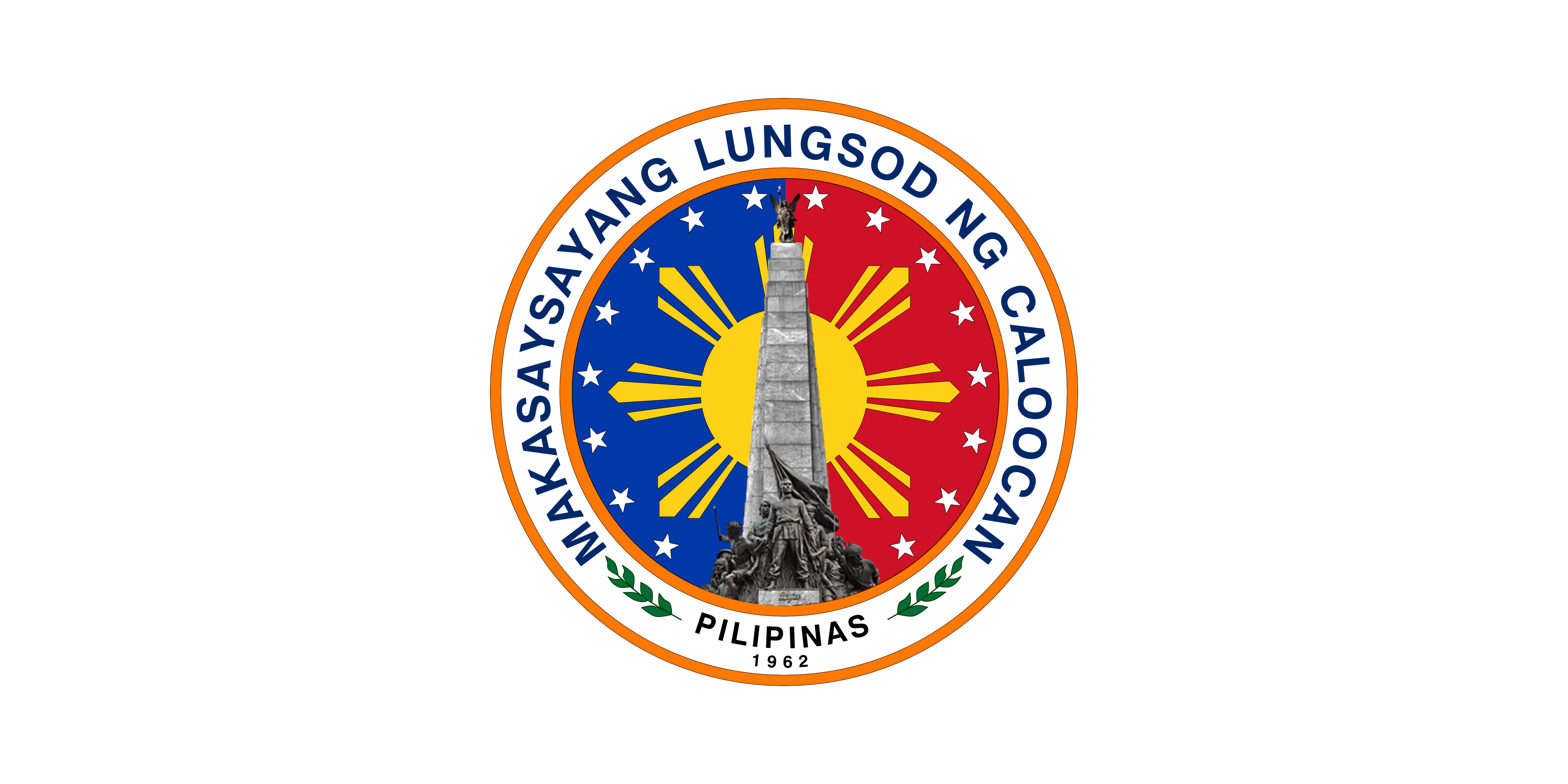
- May 13, 2013
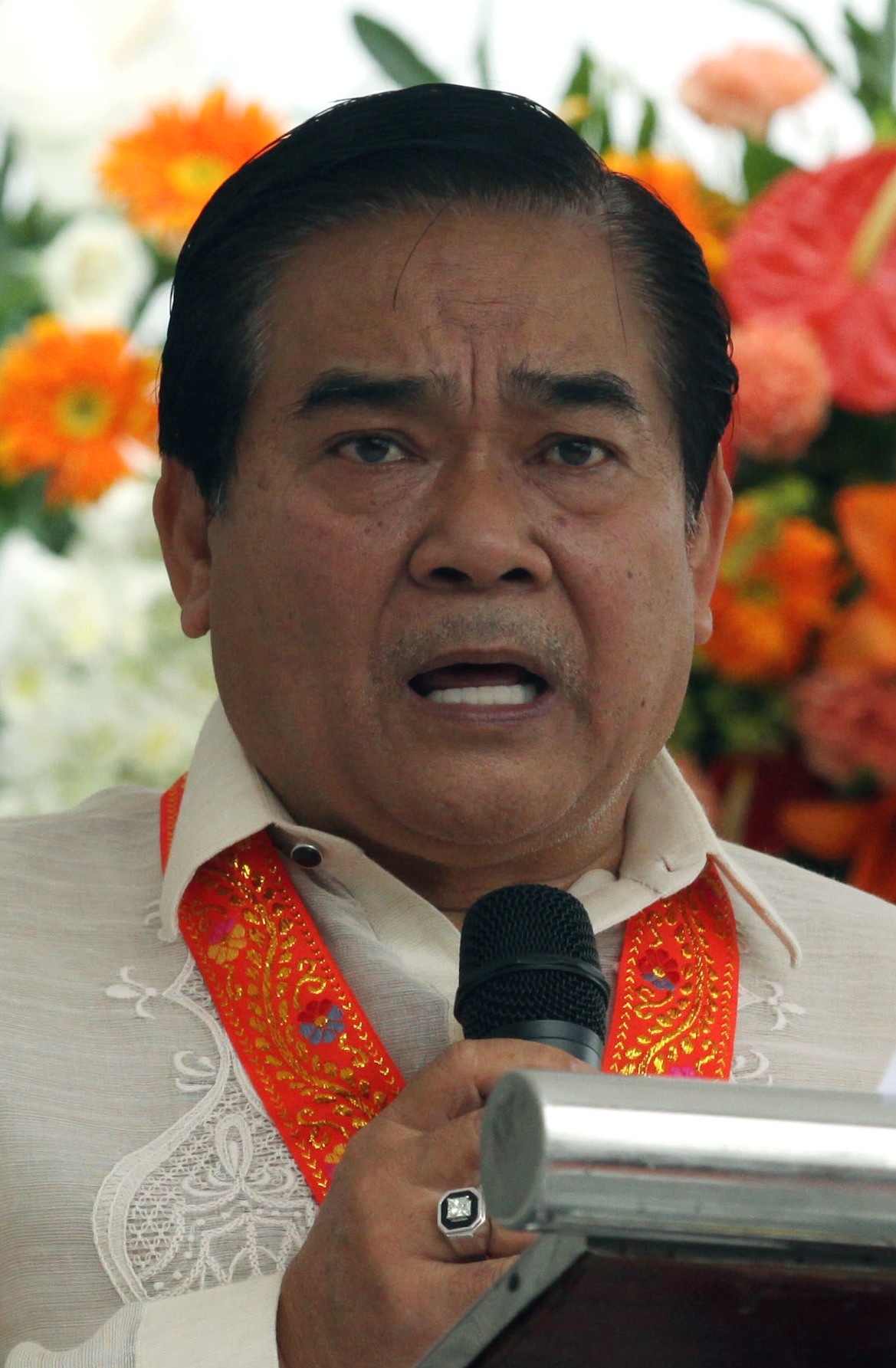
Nominee	Oscar "Oca" Malapitan	Ricojudge Janvier "RJ" Echiverri
Party	UNA	Liberal
Running mate	Antonio Mariano "Nani" Almeda	Luisito "Luis Tito" Varela
Popular vote	227,308	156,748
Percentage	54.47	37.56
Mayor before election
Enrico Echiverri
Liberal
Elected mayor
Oscar Malapitan
UNA
- Vice mayoral election
Candidate	Luis Macario "Maca" Asistio III	Luis "Tito" Varela
Party	PMP	Liberal
Popular vote	112,488	105,599
Percentage	26.96%	25.31%
Vice Mayor before election
Tito Varela
Liberal
Elected Vice Mayor
Maca Asistio
PMP

Local elections in Caloocan were held on May 13, 2013 within the Philippine general election. The voters elected for the elective local posts in the city: the mayor, vice mayor, the two Congressmen, and the councilors, six in each of the city's two legislative districts.

Oscar Malapitan won the mayoral elections and competed against RJ Echiverri, son of the former mayor Enrico Echiverri, Enrico Echiverri was mayor of Caloocan from 2004 to 2013.

== Background ==
Mayor Enrico Echiverri was term-limited and ineligible for reelection. His son, League of the Barangay National President Ricojudge Janvier "RJ" Echiverri was his party's nominee and ran under Liberal Party. He faced First District Rep. Oscar Malapitan of United Nationalist Alliance, and independents former Mayor Boy Asistio Jr. and Dionisio Guillarte.

Vice Mayor Edgar Erice chose to run for city's congressional race representing second district. His party chosen former Vice Mayor Luis "Tito" Varela to run for him. Varela faced Councilor Macario "Maca" Asistio III of Pwersa ng Masang Pilipino, Roberto "Nani" Almeda of United Nationalist Alliance, and independents former Mayor Rey Malonzo, and Mariano Yu.

Oscar Malapitan was term-limited and he chose to run for mayor. His party chose his son, councilor Dale Gonzalo Malapitan to run in his place. Dale Gonzalo Malapitan was challenged by Enrico Echiverri of the Liberal Party independents including former Rep. Bobby Guanzon, Maria Hernando, Milagros Libuton, Sandro Limpin, Imelda Pengson and Sirgea Villamayor.

Second District Rep. Mary Mitzi Cajayon-Uy ran for re-election for second term. She faced prominent candidates, including former Second Rep. Luis "Baby" Asistio under Nationalist People's Coalition, Vice Mayor Edgar Erice under Liberal Party, Carlos Cabochan of Ang Kapatiran Party, and independent Adoracion Garcia.

== Results ==
=== For Mayor ===
First District Rep. Oscar "Oca" Malapitan defeated Liga President Ricojudge Janvier "RJ" Echiverri, son of Mayor Enrico "Recom" Echiverri. Malapitan and younger Echiverri faced-off in congressional elections for city's first district in 2007.

Caloocan Mayoral Elections
Party	Candidate	Votes	%
UNA	Oscar "Oca" Malapitan	227,308	54.47
Liberal	Ricojudge Janvier "RJ" Echiverri	156,748	37.56
Independent	Macario "Boy" Asistio Jr.	8,779	2.10
Independent	Dionisio "Diony" Guillarte	1,543	0.37
Margin of victory		70,559	16.88%
Invalid or blank votes		22,917	5.49
Total votes		417,294	100
UNA gain from Liberal			

=== For Vice Mayor ===
Vice Mayor Luis "Tito" Varela was defeated by Second District Councilor Luis Macario "Maca" Asistio III.

Caloocan Vice Mayoral Elections
Party	Candidate	Votes	%
PMP	Luis Macario "Maca" Asistio III	112,488	26.96
Liberal	Luis "Tito" Varela	105,599	25.31
UNA	Antonio Mariano "Nani" Almeda	88,761	21.27
Independent	Reynaldo "Rey" Malonzo	66,341	15.90
Independent	Mariano "Marion" Yu	2,519	0.60
Margin of victory		6,889	1.65%
Invalid or blank votes		41,586	9.97
Total votes		417,294	100
PMP gain from Liberal			

=== For Representatives ===
==== First District ====
Mayor Enrico "Recom" Echiverri defeated Councilor Dale Gonzalo "Along" Malapitan with a margin of 12,756 votes.

Congressional Elections in Caloocan's First District
Party	Candidate	Votes	%
Liberal	Enrico "Recom" Echiverri	126,209	46.82
UNA	Dale Gonzalo "Along" Malapitan	113,453	42.09
Independent	Roberto "Bobby" Guanzon	10,443	3.87
Independent	Imelda Pengson	374	0.14
Independent	Maria Hernando	364	0.13
Independent	Milagros Libuton	329	0.12
Independent	Sirgea Villamayor	283	0.10
Independent	Sandro Limpin	193	0.07
Margin of victory		12,756	4.73%
Invalid or blank votes		17,904	6.64
Total votes		269,552	100
Liberal gain from UNA			

==== Second District ====
Rep. Mary Mitzi "Mitch" Cajayon-Uy was defeated by Vice Mayor Edgar "Egay" Erice by a thin margin.

Congressional Elections in Caloocan's Second District
Party	Candidate	Votes	%
Liberal	Edgar "Egay" Erice	57,318	38.80
NUP	Mary Mitzi "Mitch" Cajayon-Uy	49,976	33.83
NPC	Luis "Baby" Asistio	26,196	17.73
Ang Kapatiran	Carlos Cabochan	3,346	2.26
Independent	Adoracion Garcia	473	0.32
Margin of victory		7,342	4.97%
Invalid or blank votes		10,443	7.06
Total votes		147,742	100
Liberal gain from NUP			

=== For City Councilors ===
==== Administration coalition (Team RJ) ====
Liberal Party/Caloocan-1st District
Name	Party	Result
Henry Cammayo	Liberal	lost
Andy Mabagos	Liberal	lost
Cenon Mayor	Liberal	lost
Alou Nubla	Liberal	won
Patrick Prado	Liberal	lost
Susan Punzalan	Liberal	won

Liberal Party/Caloocan-2nd District
Name	Party	Result
Chito Abel	Liberal	won
Allen Aruelo	Liberal	won
L.A. Asistio	Liberal	lost
Tino Bagus	Liberal	won
Carol Cunanan	Liberal	won
Arnold Divina	Liberal	lost

==== Primary opposition coalition (Team Oca) ====
United Nationalist Alliance/Caloocan-1st District
Name	Party	Result
Jay Africa	UNA	won
Dean Asistio	UNA	won
Lolit Corpuz	UNA	lost
Onet Henson	UNA	won
Obet Quizon	UNA	lost
Karina Teh	UNA	won

United Nationalist Alliance/Caloocan-2nd District
Name	Party	Result
Wewel De Leon	UNA	lost
Lando Doloso	UNA	lost
James Lao	UNA	lost
Rose Mercado	UNA	won
Jerrboy Mauricio	UNA	lost
Obet Samson	UNA	won

==== First District ====
City Council Elections in Caloocan's First District
Party	Candidate	Votes	%
Liberal	Susanna "Susan" Punzalan	119,416	9.16
UNA	Anna Karina Teh	116,655	8.95
Liberal	Marylou "Alou" Nubla	107,979	8.28
UNA	Jay Africa	90,411	6.93
UNA	Dean Asistio	89,588	6.87
UNA	Onet Henson	89,348	6.85
Liberal	Henry Cammayo	85,594	6.56
Liberal	Andy Mabagos	82,565	6.33
Liberal	Patrick Prado	78,270	6.00
Liberal	Cenon Mayor	62,326	4.78
UNA	Lolit Corpuz	59,170	4.54
UNA	Obet Quizon	58,340	4.47
Independent	Jay Trillanes	49,061	3.76
Independent	Boy Bacolod	38,586	2.96
NUP	Andy Asistio	34,067	2.61
Independent	Tiffany Aguilar	32,940	2.53
Independent	Ruben Gatchalian	20,204	1.55
Independent	Tina Guino-o	17,059	1.31
Nacionalista	Cherry Sarmiento-Vallega	17,031	1.31
Reform Caloocan Party	Jun Ling	16,021	1.23
PMP	Leonardo Padilla	11,253	0.86
Independent	Cielo Alonzo	9,702	0.74
Independent	Princess Nathalie Roll	9,010	0.69
Independent	Tyrone De Leon	5,175	0.40
Independent	Josue Engano	4,222	0.32
Total votes		269,552	100.00%

==== Second District ====
City Council Elections in Caloocan's Second District
Party	Candidate	Votes	%
Liberal	Carolyn "Carol" Cunanan	76,192	10.62
Liberal	Tolentino "Tino" Bagus	69,249	9.66
UNA	Ma. Milagros "Rose" Mercado	62,669	8.74
Liberal	Allen Alexander Aruelo	62,282	8.68
UNA	Roberto "Obet" Samson	59,698	8.32
Liberal	Luis Chito Abel	56,799	7.92
Liberal	Luis Asistio III	52,580	7.33
UNA	Jerrboy Mauricio	50,982	7.11
Liberal	Arnold Divina	50,835	7.09
PMP	Nancy Quimpo	41,104	5.73
Independent	Dennis Macalintal	34,480	4.86
UNA	Emmanuel "Wewel" De Leon	32,873	4.58
UNA	Lando Doloso	28,190	3.93
UNA	James Lao	26,779	3.73
Independent	Alvin Abelardo	8,369	1.17
Independent	Anthony Lopez	3,690	0.51
Total votes		147,742	100.00
