= 2016 Caloocan local elections =

14th City and Mayoral elections in Caloocan

2016 Caloocan mayoral elections
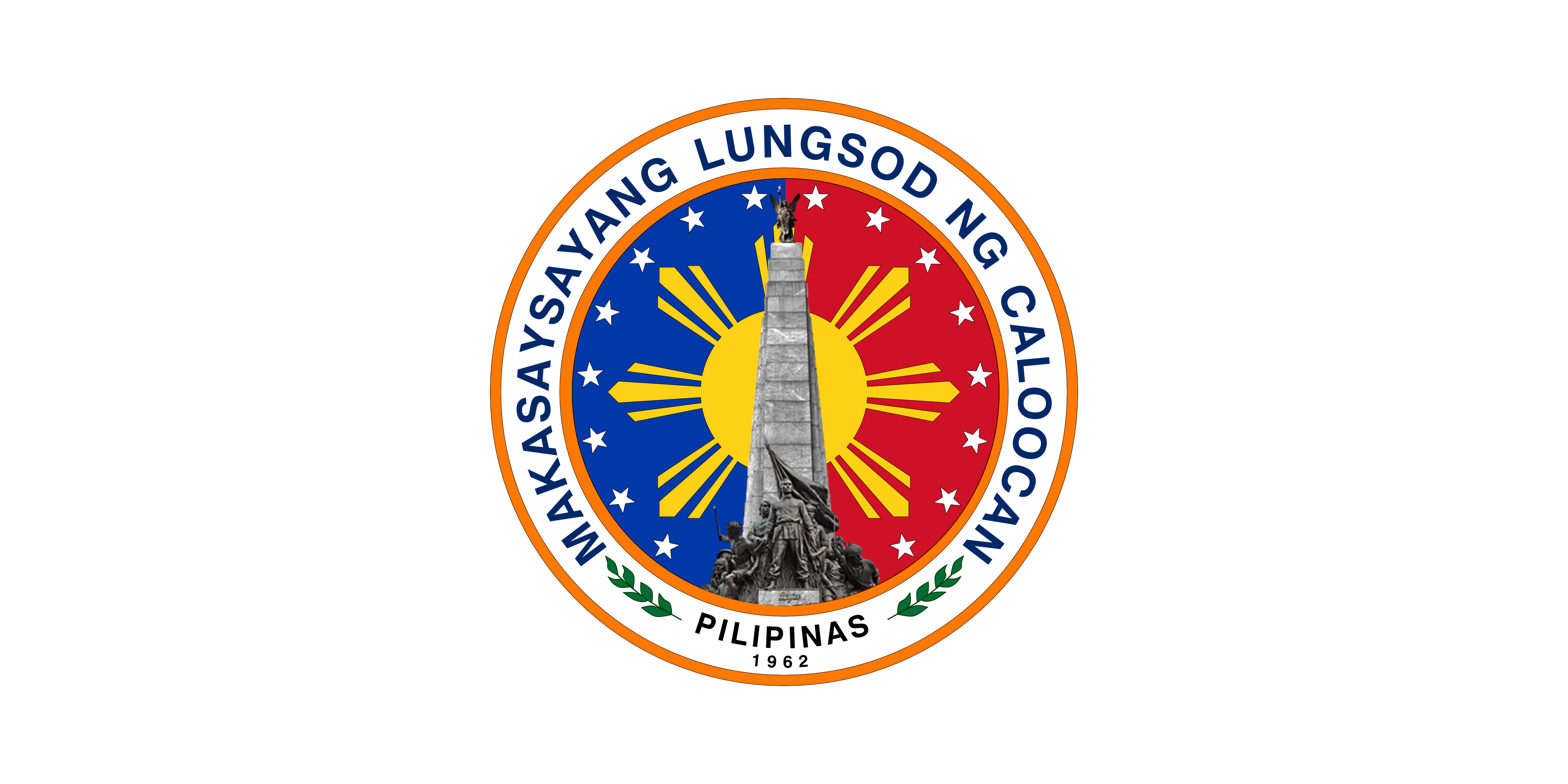
- May 9, 2016
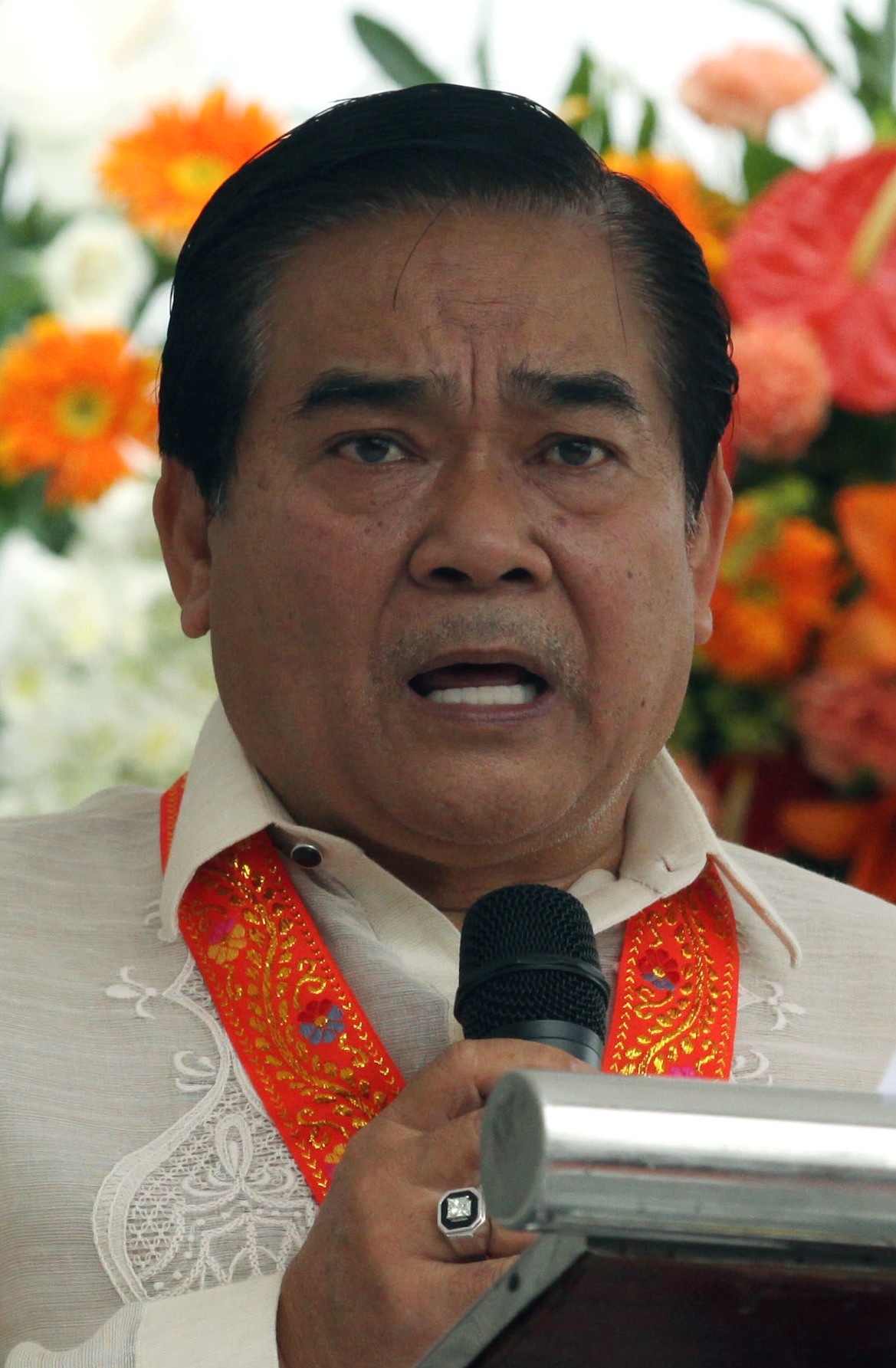
Nominee	Oscar "Oca" Malapitan	Enrico "Recom" Echiverri
Party	Nacionalista	NPC
Running mate	Luis Macario "Maca" Asistio III	Rodolfo "Ato" Oliva
Popular vote	302,867	172,278
Percentage	62.33%	35.45%
Mayor before election
Oscar Malapitan
UNA
Elected mayor
Oscar Malapitan
Nacionalista

Local elections in Caloocan were held on May 9, 2016, within the Philippine general election. The voters elected for the elective local posts in the city: the mayor, vice mayor, the two Congressmen, and the councilors, six in each of the city's two legislative districts.

== Background ==
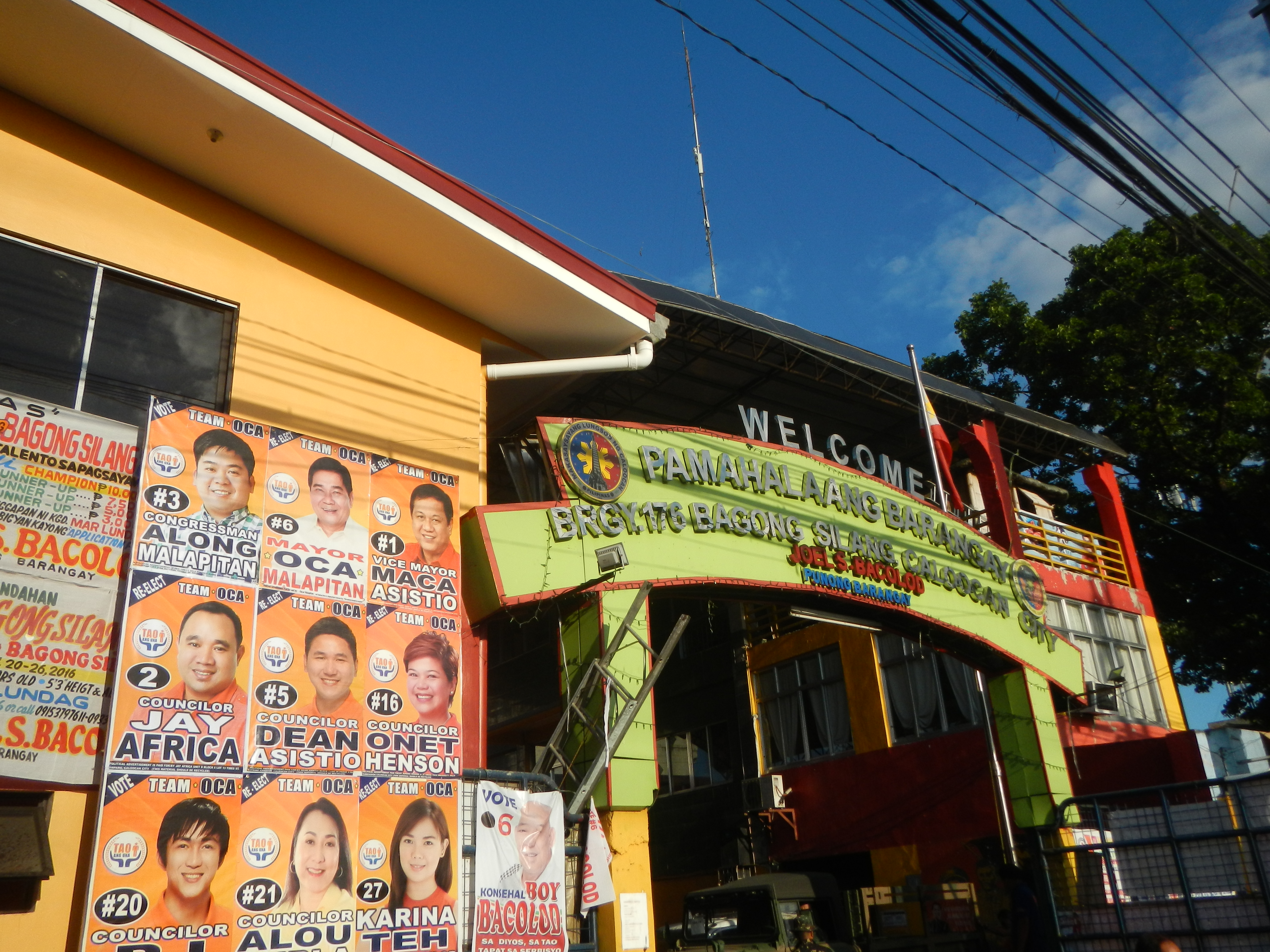
Campaign posters in Bagong Silang (Barangay 176)

In 2015, Mayor Oscar Malapitan founded their city-wide party called "Tao Ang Una", which was later approved by the Commission on Elections.

Mayor Oscar Malapitan ran for re-election for his second term. He was challenged by First District Rep. Recom Echiverri, and independents including former Mayor Macario "Boy" Asistio Jr., Zenia Cabaluna, Ricky Carpio, and Rufino "Ruffy" Bayon-on.

Vice Mayor Luis Macario "Maca" Asistio III ran for re-election for his second term. He was challenged by Rodolfo "Ato" Oliva, Adolfo de Castro, and Brother Patapat.

Tao Ang Una party was composed of city-based politicians affiliated with the Liberal Party (LP), Pwersa ng Masang Pilipino (PMP) and UNA. Among them was the LP Vice Chairman for Political Affairs and District 2 Representative Edgar Erice and Vice Mayor Luis Macario "Maca" Asistio.

First District Rep. Recom Echiverri was on his first term. Though eligible to run for second term, he chose to run for mayor. His party chosen Councilor Susana Punzalan to run for his place. Punzalan was challenged by defeated 2013 congressional candidate and former Councilor Along Malapitan, Romualdo Orbe, Garth Gollayan, Violeta "Violy" Dela Cruz, and Glenn Operiano.

Second District Rep. Edgar Erice ran for re-election for second term. He was challenged by his previous opponent, former Representative Mary Mitzi Cajayon-Uy, and Edgardo Espiritu of Partido Bagong Maharlika (PBM).

== Results ==
=== For Mayor ===
Mayor Oscar Malapitan won over First District Rep. Enrico "Recom" Echiverri, winning a second term by a margin of 26.88%.

Caloocan Mayoralty Elections
Party	Candidate	Votes	%
Nacionalista	Oscar "Oca" Malapitan	302,867	62.33
NPC	Enrico "Recom" Echiverri	172,278	35.45
Independent	Macario "Boy" Asistio, Jr.	8,657	1.78
Independent	Zenia Cabaluna	1,000	0.21
Independent	Ricky Carpio	645	0.13
Independent	Ruffy Bayon-on	464	0.10
Total votes		485,911	100.00

=== For Vice Mayor ===
Vice Mayor Luis Macario "Maca" Asistio III won over Rodolfo "Ato" Oliva.

Caloocan Vice Mayoralty Elections
Party	Candidate	Votes	%
PMP	Luis Macario "Maca" Asistio III	333,971	75.84
NPC	Rodolfo "Ato" Oliva	91,190	20.71
Independent	Adolfo de Castro	12,486	2.84
PBM	Brother Patapat	2,700	0.61
Total votes		440,347	100.00

=== For Representative ===
==== First District ====
Former Councilor Dale Gonzalo "Along" Malapitan won over Councilor Susanna Punzalan.

Congressional Elections in Caloocan's First District
Party	Candidate	Votes	%
Liberal	Dale Gonzalo "Along" Malapitan	215,639	68.49
NPC	Susanna Punzalan	90,950	28.89
PBM	Romualdo Orbe	2,996	0.95
PDP–Laban	Garth Gollayan	2,376	0.75
Independent	Violeta dela Cruz	1,744	0.55
Independent	Glenn Openiano	1,160	0.37
Valid ballots		314,865	91.12
Invalid or blank votes		30,694	8.88
Total votes		345,559	100.00

==== Second District ====
Rep. Edgar "Egay" Erice defeated former Rep. Mary Mitzi "Mitch" Cajayon for the second time.

Congressional Elections in Caloocan's Second District
Party	Candidate	Votes	%
Liberal	Edgar "Egay" Erice	101,051	64.67
NPC	Mary Mitzi "Mitch" Cajayon-Uy	52,549	33.63
PBM	Edgardo Espiritu	2,655	1.70
Total votes		156,255	100.00

=== For Councilors ===
==== Team Oca (TAO ang UNA) ====
First District
Name	Party
Jay Africa	UNA
Dean Asistio	UNA
Onet Henson	UNA
PJ Malonzo	UNA
Alou Nubla	Liberal
Karina Teh	UNA

Second District
Name	Party
L.A. Asistio	Liberal
Tino Bagus	Liberal
Carol Cunanan	Liberal
Jerrboy Mauricio	UNA
Rose Mercado	UNA
Obet Samson	UNA

==== Team Recom ====
First District
Name	Party
Dante Abuda	NPC
Donna de Gana	NPC
Edres Domato	NPC
Mel Mabagos	NPC
Marlon Palmere	NPC
Dante Prado	NPC

Second District
Name	Party
Alex Mangasar	NPC
JM Matarangon	NPC
Jinky Panganiban	NPC
Ka Lando Sustuido	NPC
Joseph Timbol	NPC
Johnny Uy	NPC

==== First District ====
City Council Elections in Caloocan's First District
Party	Candidate	Votes	%
UNA	Anna Karina Teh	201,320	
UNA	Christopher "PJ" Malonzo	185,458	
UNA	Dean Asistio	166,535	
UNA	Carmelo "Jay" Africa III	165,022	
UNA	Aurora "Onet" Henson Jr.	154,557	
Liberal	Marylou "Alou" Nubla-San Buenaventura	148,316	
NPC	Dante Prado	98,778	
NPC	Melinda "Mel" Mabagos	80,674	
Independent	Vien Vitug	76,096	
NPC	Dante Abuda	58,376	
NPC	Donna de Gana	56,553	
NPC	Edres Domato	44,924	
PDP–Laban	Henry Cammayo	42,420	
NPC	Marlon Palmere	42,110	
Independent	Gualberto Bacolod	40,168	
Liberal	Jim Barbara	22,698	
PBM	Jay Jimenez	15,487	
PBM	Jimmy Fuentes	11,341	
Independent	Roberto Aquino, Jr.	11,189	
PBM	Aloha Javier	11,012	
Independent	Tyrone De Leon, Sr.	9,284	
Independent	Edmundo Soriano	8,442	
PBM	Willie Ricablanca, Jr.	7,753	
PDP–Laban	Ver Apar	7,462	
Independent	Al Olegario	5,276	
Independent	Walter Gantala	4,150	
Independent	Rolly Bugais	3,509	
Total votes		1,583,894	100%

==== Second District ====
City Council Elections in Caloocan's Second District
Party	Candidate	Votes	%
Liberal	Carol Cunanan	100,081	
Liberal	Tolentino "Tino" Bagus	90,103	
UNA	Ma. Milagros "Rose" Mercado	86,856	
UNA	Roberto "Obet" Samson	83,506	
Liberal	Luis "L.A" Asistio III	82,629	
Liberal	Edgardo "Doc Ed" Aruelo	78,912	
UNA	Jerrboy Mauricio	64,736	
NPC	Alexander Mangasar	53,560	
Liberal	Arnold Divina	50,900	
NPC	Johnny Uy	31,099	
NPC	Joseph Timbol	24,211	
NPC	Jinky Panganiban	15,500	
NPC	Lando Sustuido	12,776	
NPC	JM Mataragnon	12,580	
Independent	Tany Catacutan	6,780	
PBM	Marjohn Lloyd Acosta	5,841	
Independent	Marlon Santos	4,357	
PBM	Edwin Pascual	4,283	
Independent	Joe Palicte	4,124	
PBM	Efren Simangan	2,792	
PBM	Oliver Atutubo	2,772	
Total votes		819,148	100%
