= Mitch Cajayon-Uy =

Filipino politician (born 1978)

Mary Mitzi Cajayon
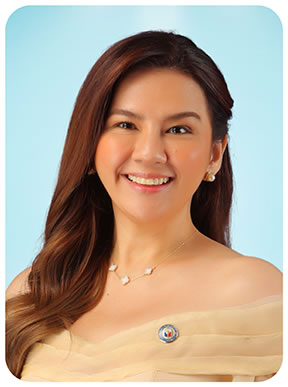
- Official portrait, 2022

Member of the Philippine House of Representatives from Caloocan's 2nd congressional district
- In office June 30, 2022 – June 30, 2025
- Preceded by: Edgar Erice
- Succeeded by: Edgar Erice
- In office June 30, 2007 – June 30, 2013
- Preceded by: Luis Asistio
- Succeeded by: Edgar Erice

Executive Director of the Council for the Welfare of Children
- In office July 25, 2017 – October 5, 2021
- President: Rodrigo Duterte

Member of the Caloocan City Council from the 2nd District
- In office June 30, 2004 – June 30, 2007

Personal details
- Born: May 6, 1978 (age 48) Santa Cruz, Manila, Philippines
- Party: Lakas (2008–2011; 2023–present)
- Other political affiliations: PDP–Laban (2021–2023); NPC (2015–2021); NUP (2011–2015); Lakas (I) (2003–2008)
- Website: Official website

Mary Mitzi "Mitch" Lim Cajayon-Uy (born May 6, 1978) is a Filipino politician and former beauty queen who represented the 2nd district of Caloocan, Metro Manila, in the House of Representatives of the Philippines from 2007 to 2013 and from 2022 to 2025. She also served as the executive director of the Council for the Welfare of Children, an attached agency of the Department of Social Welfare and Development from 2017 to 2021, and had served as a city councilor of Caloocan from 2004 to 2007.

She was appointed the executive director of the Council for the Welfare of Children, having been appointed to the post by President Rodrigo Duterte in July 2017. She resigned from the position to run once again for representative at the 2nd district of Caloocan in 2022; she later won the race. In 2025, she lost re-election to her seat in the House of Representatives.

Prior to joining politics, Cajayon was named as Miss Caloocan in 2000.

In November 2021, the Sandiganbayan acquitted Cajayon-Uy of graft and malversation charges linked to the alleged misuse of ₱10 million in PDAF funds. In September 2025, she was named in a Senate probe as an alleged recipient of ₱16.5 million in kickbacks from flood control projects.

== Pageantry ==
In 2000, Cajayon won the Mutya ng Caloocan beauty pageant.

== Political career ==
=== Councilor of Caloocan (2004–2007) ===
Cajayon served as city councilor of Caloocan for one term from 2004 to 2007.

=== House of Representatives (2007–2013; 2022–2025) ===
Cajayon won as representative of Caloocan's 2nd district in 2007, defeating re-electionist representative Edgar Erice, Nilo Divina and one other candidate. In 2009, she was given the Award for Congressional Legislative and Service Excellence by the Consumers League of the Philippines Foundation, Inc. She won a second term as congresswoman in 2010, defeating Antonio M. Almeda, Carlos Cabochan, councilor Rose Mercado, and four other candidates. By 2013, however, she lost her reelection to Erice. She also attempted a comeback in 2016, but still lost to Erice.

In July 2017, President Rodrigo Duterte appointed Cajayon-Uy as executive director of the Department of Social Welfare and Development's (DSWD) Council for the Welfare of Children. In September 2021, she joined the PDP-Laban party of president Duterte days before the filing of certificates of candidacy in the 2022 election. Cajayon-Uy ultimately won a third term as congresswoman of Caloocan's 2nd district as a standalone candidate, receiving more votes than Roberto Samson, Luis Macario "Maca" Asistio and two others.

In November 2023, Cajayon-Uy left PDP–Laban to join the Lakas–CMD party. In February 2025, Cajayon-Uy was among the 95 Lakas–CMD members who voted to impeach vice president Sara Duterte. She also ran for re-election in 2025 under the local ticket of Mayor Along Malapitan, but lost to Erice once again. During the campaign, she had also sued Erice for allegedly demeaning her, specifically in response to his claims that she prioritized the distribution of aid to her constituents over her legislative duties.

== Controversies ==
In July 2018, Cajayon-Uy was charged of graft and malversation charges in relation to the alleged misuse of ₱10 million in Priority Development Assistance Fund for supposed ghost projects in 2009. The charges, which stem from ₱3 million and ₱7 million funds for Comprehensive Integrated Delivery of Social Services (CIDSS) projects, claim that Cajayon-Uy was responsible for recommending Kaloocan Assistance Council Inc. (KACI) as the project partner. She was later acquitted by the Sandiganbayan on November 12, 2021.

In September 2025, former Department of Public Works and Highways engineers Henry Alcantara and Brice Hernandez identified Cajayon-Uy as an alleged recipient of kickbacks from flood control projects in Bulacan. During a Senate hearing on September 19, Hernandez stated that Cajayon-Uy received approximately ₱16.5 million in payoffs between 2022 and 2023. Cajayon-Uy refuted this, stating she represented Caloocan, not Bulacan, and said that all infrastructure projects in her district during her term are publicly documented. Her name resurfaced during a September 23 Senate hearing, where Alcantara mentioned her again alongside other lawmakers, including Senators Jinggoy Estrada and Joel Villanueva, former senator Bong Revilla, and Ako Bicol representative Zaldy Co, as alleged beneficiaries of commissions from flood control projects. That same day, the Anti–Money Laundering Council ordered asset freezing for Alcantara, Hernandez, and all alleged benificiaries, including Cajayon-Uy.

House of Representatives of the Philippines
Preceded by Luis Asistio	Representative, 2nd District of Caloocan; 2007–2013	Succeeded by Edgar Erice
Preceded by Edgar Erice	Representative, 2nd District of Caloocan; 2022–2025	Succeeded by Edgar Erice
