= Mayor of Caloocan =

Local chief executive of Caloocan, Philippines

- Punong Lungsod ng Kalookan
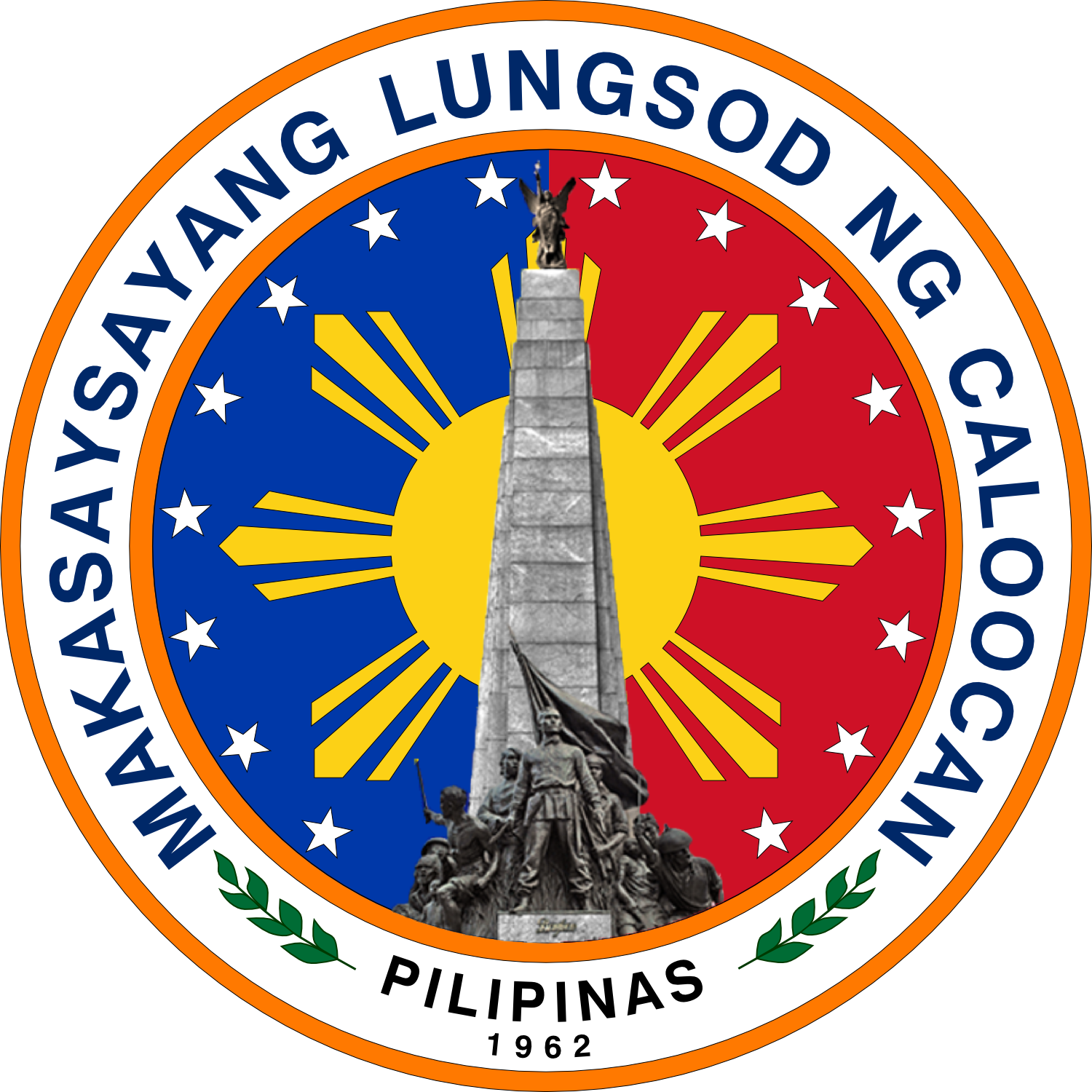
- Seal of Caloocan

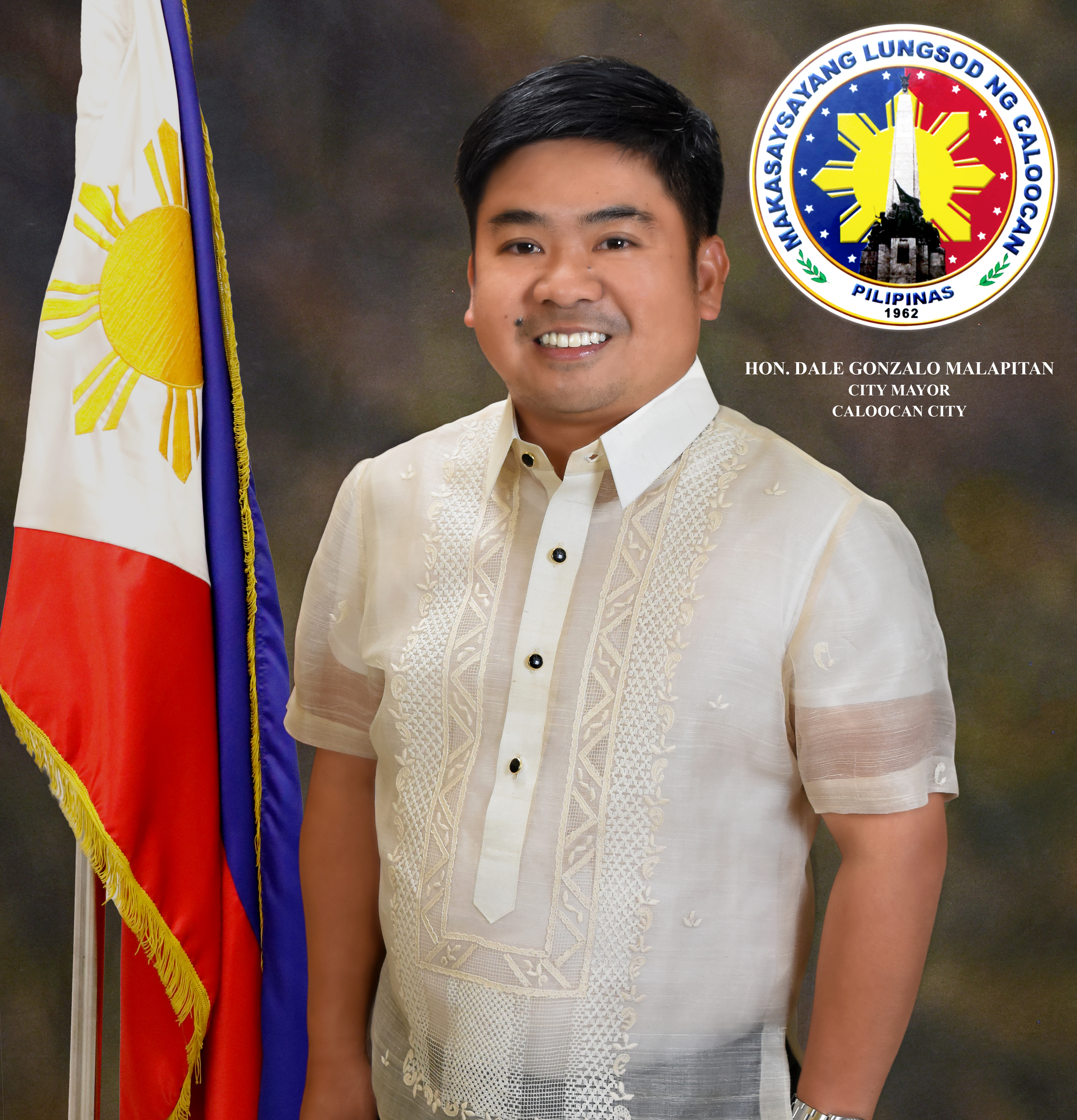
- Incumbent; Dale Gonzalo "Along" Malapitan since June 30, 2022
- Style: Mayor, The Honorable
- Seat: Caloocan City Hall; Caloocan City Hall North
- Appointer: Elected via popular vote
- Term length: 3 years
- Inaugural holder: Pedro Silva
- Formation: 1902

The Mayor of Caloocan (Filipino: Punong Lungsod ng Kalookan) is the head of the local government of the city of Caloocan who elected to three-year terms. The mayor is also the executive head and leads the city's departments in executing the city ordinances and improving public services. The city mayor is restricted to three consecutive terms, totaling nine years, although a mayor can be elected again after an interruption of one term. The mayor holds office at both the Caloocan City Hall in Grace Park and at the Caloocan City Hall North in Camarin.

Along Malapitan is the incumbent mayor of the city since June 2022.

Caloocan City Hall

== List ==
No.	Image	Mayor	Deputy (later Vice Mayor)	Starting date	Ending date
Municipal President of Caloocan, Province of Rizal
1		Pedro Silva		1902	1904
2		Silverio Baltazar		1904	1906
3		Tomas Susano		1906	1908
4		Leon Nadurata		1908	1910
5		Emilio Sanchez		1910	1913
6		Godofredo Herrera		1913	1915
7		Jose Sanchez		1915	1921
8		Dominador Aquino		1922	1925
9		Pablo Pablo		1926	1928
10		Dominador Aquino		1928	1931
11		Pablo Pablo	Brias Bernardino (1932-1934); Segundo Asistio (1934-1937)	1932	1940
Municipal Mayor of Caloocan, Province of Rizal
*		Cornelio Cordero^{[a]}		1941	1944
12		Dr. Oscar Baello		1945	1946
13		Jesus Basa	Anacleto Bustamante (1950-1954)	1946	1951
14		Col. Macario B. Asistio Sr.	Mateo Lualhati (1962-1963)	1952	1962
City Mayor of Caloocan, Province of Rizal
15		Col. Macario B. Asistio Sr.	Mateo Lualhati (1962-1963) Alejandro Fider (1963-1971)	1962	1971
16		Marcial Samson	Isagani Arcadio	1972	1976
City Mayor of Caloocan, Metropolitan Manila
17		Alejandro Fider		1976	1978
18		Toribio Paulino		February 18, 1978	May 7, 1978
19		Alejandro Fider		May 8, 1978	June 14, 1978
20		Virgilio Robles		June 15, 1978	December 31, 1979
21		Macario "Boy" Asistio Jr.	Macario Floro Ramirez Sr.	January 7, 1980	April 20, 1986
*		Virgilio Robles^{[b]}	Vicente del Mundo	April 24, 1986	November 1986
*		Antonio Martinez^{[b]}	Vicente del Mundo	December 1986	December 4, 1987
*		Crispulo San Gabriel^{[b]}	Lina Aurelio	December 5, 1987	February 2, 1988
22		Macario "Boy" Asistio Jr.	Celestino Rosca (1988-1992) Reynaldo "Rey" Malonzo (1992-1995)	February 2, 1988	June 30, 1995
23		Reynaldo "Rey" Malonzo	Nancy Quimpo (1995-1998) Oscar "Oca" Malapitan (1998-2001) Luis "Tito" Varela (2001-2004)	June 30, 1995	June 30, 2004
24		Enrico "Recom" Echiverri	Luis "Tito" Varela (2004-2010) Edgar "Egay" Erice (2010-2013)	June 30, 2004	June 30, 2013
25		Oscar "Oca" Malapitan	Macario "Maca" Asistio III	June 30, 2013	June 30, 2022
26		Dale Gonzalo Malapitan	Anna Karina Teh-Limsico	June 30, 2022	present

^{a} Concurrently served as the District Chief of Caloocan, when it was part of the City of Greater Manila.
^{b} Served in an acting capacity.

== Elections ==
- 2007 Caloocan local elections
- 2010 Caloocan local elections
- 2013 Caloocan local elections
- 2016 Caloocan local elections
- 2019 Caloocan local elections
- 2022 Caloocan local elections
- 2025 Caloocan local elections
