= Recom Echiverri =

Filipino lawyer and politician

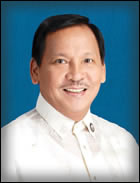
- Official portrait, 2013

Member of the Philippine House of Representatives from Caloocan's 1st congressional district
- In office June 30, 2013 – June 30, 2016
- Preceded by: Oscar Malapitan
- Succeeded by: Along Malapitan
- In office June 30, 1998 – June 30, 2004
- Preceded by: Bobby Guanzon
- Succeeded by: Oscar Malapitan

24th Mayor of Caloocan
- In office June 30, 2004 – June 30, 2013
- Vice Mayor: Tito Varela (2004–2010); Edgar Erice (2010–2013)
- Preceded by: Rey Malonzo
- Succeeded by: Oscar Malapitan

Member of the Caloocan City Council
- In office February 2, 1988 – June 30, 1992

Personal details
- Born: November 18, 1954 (age 71) Manila, Philippines
- Party: PDDS (2021–present)
- Other political affiliations: NPC (2016–2021); Independent (before 1997; 2015–2016); Liberal (2009–2015); Lakas–CMD (1997–2009)
- Spouse: Purificacion Malabanan
- Children: 6
- Education: De La Salle Araneta University; San Beda University; Ateneo de Manila University
- Occupation: Public Servant
- Profession: Lawyer

Enrico "Recom" Reantillo Echiverri (born November 18, 1954) is a Filipino lawyer and politician. He previously served as a member of the Philippine House of Representatives representing the Caloocan's 1st district and Mayor of Caloocan.

== Education ==
Echiverri spent his grade school years at Morning Breeze Elementary School in Caloocan. He finished his secondary studies at the Gregorio Araneta University Foundation High School in Malabon in 1971. He took up AB Economics at San Beda University. Upon graduation, he studied at the Ateneo de Manila University and finished his degree in Bachelor of Laws in 1981.

== Career ==
Before he entered politics, Echiverri served as an arbiter and conciliator at the Department of Labor and Employment from 1981 to 1988 and simultaneously as legal counsel for J. Antonio Leviste Company from 1984 to 1988. He was also appointed Director of the Videogram Regulatory Board in the early 1990s.

Echiverri's political career began when he was elected city councilor in Caloocan from 1988 to 1992. In 1995, he worked as secretary to the mayor under Rey Malonzo until he ran for Congress in 1998. He became the representative of the 1st district of Caloocan in the House of Representatives for two consecutive terms from 1998 to 2004. He was also a law professor at four universities, namely Maryknoll College, San Beda College, Far Eastern University, and Manila Central University.

Echiverri was elected mayor in 2004, defeating Gigi Malonzo, Edgar Erice, Macario "Boy" Asistio Jr., and Luis "Baby" Asistio. He had served as mayor for three terms from 2004 to 2013. He left Lakas Kampi CMD and joined the Liberal Party in 2009, ahead of his 2010 mayoralty reelection bid, to support the presidential candidacy of Benigno Aquino III. During the 2013 elections, he sought a comeback to the Congress at the 1st district and won. Meanwhile, his son Ricojudge ("RJ") ran for mayor but lost to Oscar Malapitan, the outgoing representative of the 1st district.

Echiverri ran for mayor in 2016 as a new member of Nationalist People's Coalition, but lost to incumbent mayor Malapitan.

Echiverri attempted a political comeback for the 2022 elections when he ran for representative of the newly created 3rd district of Caloocan. Though a member of Pederalismo ng Dugong Dakilang Samahan, he ran under the Team Bughaw ticket of 2nd district Rep. Edgar Erice, mayoralty candidate under Aksyon Demokratiko. However, he lost to councilor Dean Asistio.

Echiverri, along with two former city officials, was charged with 13 counts each of graft and falsification of public documents in connection with the pathwalk and drainage repair project in 2012. In October 2022, the Sandiganbayan dismissed all charges due to lack of evidence.

== Awards ==
- Dangal ng Bayan Award for Public Service, 12th Annual Asia-Pacific Excellence Award
- Huwarang Ama for Public Service / Outstanding Father of the Year, National Mother's Day & Father's Day Awards
- Innovative Solutions to Dumps and Waste Award (“Out of the Box Award”), Mother Earth Foundation
- Bagong Bayani ng Caloocan Award, Humanitarian Mission
- Recognition Award for the successful & effective implementation of DILG-NCR Programs, Department of the Interior and Local Government
- Plaque of Merit, 2nd Best City Police Station of the Year, Philippine National Police
- Distinguished Public Service Award - Exemplary Performance as a Leader, Integrated Bar of the Philippines
- Hall of Fame Awardee, Most Outstanding Congressman, Congress Magazine, Makati Graduate School & Metropolitan Disseminators of Information Association (MEDIA)
- Hon. Ramon V. Mitra Bedan Award for Legislation
- "Huwarang Filipino Awardee for Government & Public Service," Gintong Anak/Ina Awards, Parangal ng Bayan Foundation
- "Outstanding Legislator of the Year, Public Servant of the New Millennium,” Phil. Media Research and Progress Report Inc.
- 2003 Year-Ender Excellence Award, National Consumers Affairs Foundation
- Paul Harris Fellow, Rotary International
- Most Outstanding City Councilor, Association of Barangay Council, 1992
- Most Outstanding Alumnus, Araneta University Foundation High School
