= Rose Mercado =

Filipino politician

Member of the Caloocan City Council from the 2nd district
- In office June 30, 2013 – June 30, 2022
- In office June 30, 2004 – June 30, 2010

Personal details
- Born: Maria Milagros Salamat; November 27, 1965 (age 60) Malabon, Rizal, Philippines
- Party: Aksyon Demokratiko (2024–present)
- Other political affiliations: Nationalist People's Coalition (2019–2022); United Nationalist Alliance (2013–2019)
- Spouse: Dr. Ruben Mercado Jr.
- Children: 5, inc. Mayen Mercado

Maria Milagros "Rose" Salamat Mercado (born November 27, 1965) is a Filipino politician who served as city councilor in Caloocan's 2nd district from 2004 to 2010 and from 2013 to 2022.

Mercado was among the councilors who principally proposed ordinances that attempted to counteract the violent incidents that occurred in Caloocan during the early years of the Philippine drug war.

== Career ==
=== First two terms as councilor (2004–2010) ===
Mercado attempted to run for councilor in Caloocan's 2nd district in 2001 under the People Power Coalition, but lost. She was successfully elected councilor in 2004, and by January 2005 was made vice chairperson of the City Council for the Protection of Children. Mercado was among the group of councilors in 2005 who called for the reversal of PJ Malonzo's appointment as the replacement of recently deceased councilor Eduardo Rosca due to their initial choice of Rosca's daughter Kristen Joy for the position being ignored.

=== Third to fifth term as councilor (2013–2022) ===
In October 2014, a warrant of arrest was issued against vice mayor Macario Asistio III and the entire city council, which included Mercado, by Caloocan Regional Trial Court (RTC) judge Dionisio Sison of Branch 125 for the non-payment of a property acquired by the local government in 1996. In reaction to this, Mercado and other councilors unanimously passed a resolution declaring Sison persona non grata to the city for committing acts "inimical to the best interest of the city government and causing irreparable damage to the [city council's] integrity and reputation".

In May 2017, Mercado proposed an ordinance that penalizes "professional squatters", or informal settlers who occupy land without consent but have enough income to afford proper housing, which received pushback from the Kalipunan ng Damayang Mahihirap (Kadamay) Kalookan urban poor organization.

In early September 2017, Mercado wrote the ordinance that established the Caloocan Anti-Drug Abuse Office (CADAO) in response to the rising number of casualties in the Philippine drug war in Caloocan. Around the same time, Caloocan passed an ordinance principally sponsored by Mercado, Onet Henson and Alou Nubla, Ordinance No. 702, that implemented a new curfew for minors from 10 p.m. to 5 a.m. and placed the liability on their parents. This ordinance was written in response to the police murders of Kian delos Santos, Carl Arnaiz and Reynaldo de Guzman, all three of whom were teenagers. In April 2018, Mercado proposed an ordinance alongside PJ Malonzo and Nubla that restricted motorcycle-riding male tandems after a series of shooting incidents perpetrated by motorcycle riders occurred in the city. Upon the protest of motorcycle clubs, however, Mayor Oscar Malapitan stated that changes will first be made to the proposed ordinance before he signs it into law.

Amidst the COVID-19 pandemic in 2020, Mercado broke from the group of Mayor Malapitan and aligned herself with 2nd District Rep. Edgar "Egay" Erice, who was aspiring to run for mayor in 2022. Mercado's decision was due to her difficulty objecting to Malapitan's pandemic policies while she was allied with his administration. In November 2020, Mercado was removed as majority floor leader of the city council while its committee on ethics and discipline investigated a filmed incident where Mercado "hurled curse words" during a special council session. She clarified that the incident did not occur during a session but during recess, and that her outburst was because of the council not recognizing her and four other opposition councilors during a previous session.

On February 17, 2021, Mayor Malapitan filed a cyberlibel complaint against Mercado, Malonzo and three other opposition councilors due to their "series of videos" accusing his government of procuring substandard digital tablets for schools. By November 2021, however, Mercado was not included in the arrest warrant issued by a Caloocan RTC Branch 123 against the councilors.

On July 15, 2024, Mercado joined the Aksyon Demokratiko party alongside former senator Antonio Trillanes IV. In 2025, Mercado ran for councilor in the 3rd district as part of Trillanes' electoral team, but did not receive enough votes to win a seat in the city council.

== Personal life ==
Mercado has five children. Her one daughter, Marienne Princess "Mayen" Mercado, is an optometrist who ran for councilor in 2025 as part of Trillanes' electoral team in the 2nd district but failed to win a seat in the city council.
