= Bobby Guanzon =

Filipino broadcaster and politician (1948-2016)

Roberto "Bobby" S. Guanzon

Member of the Philippine House of Representatives for Caloocan's 1st district
- In office June 30, 1995 – June 30, 1998
- Preceded by: Aurora Asistio-Henson
- Succeeded by: Enrico Echiverri

Personal details
- Born: June 20, 1948 Ligao, Albay, Philippines
- Died: December 18, 2016 (aged 68) Caloocan, Metro Manila, Philippines
- Cause of death: Cardiac arrest
- Resting place: Manila North Cemetery
- Party: Independent
- Other political affiliations: NPC; Lakas-NUCD (c. 1995)
- Occupation: Broadcaster
- Profession: Journalist

Roberto "Bobby" Samar Guanzon (June 20, 1948 – December 18, 2016) was a Filipino radio and television broadcaster and politician.

== Career ==
Guanzon started as an anchorman and one of the pioneering members of DZAQ Radyo Patrol of ABS-CBN from 1968 until it was shut down due to martial law declaration.

He later became anchor of radio stations DZXL and DZBB ("Tawag Pansin") in the 1980s and in DWWW in the 1990s. It is also had a TV version aired on BBC before the People Power Revolution. Guanzon also ventured into television as an anchor of GMA Balita, the network's first flagship Filipino newscast and Kape at Balita, the first simultaneous radio-TV morning commentary show, both aired on GMA Network. He also anchored Teledyaryo, Isyu Ngayon and Tinig ng Bayan on NBN. In the recent years, he became part of DZRM Radyo Magasin as the anchor of "Gabay at Balita".

Guanzon was elected as congressman of the 1st district of Caloocan, serving for one term from 1995 to 1998. He ran again in the same elected position in 2010 and 2013, this time as an independent candidate, but lost.

== Illness and death ==
On the first week of September 2016, Guanzon suddenly lost his voice during a live broadcast on DZRM Radyo Magasin, which turned out to be his last broadcast before his death. He was later diagnosed with lung cancer. Guanzon died on December 18, 2016. He was 68.
