= Rey Malonzo =

Filipino actor and politician

23rd Mayor of Caloocan
- In office June 30, 1995 – June 30, 2004
- Vice Mayor: Nancy Quimpo (1995–1998); Oscar Malapitan (1998–2001); Tito Varela (2001–2004)
- Preceded by: Macario Asistio Jr.
- Succeeded by: Enrico Echiverri

Vice Mayor of Caloocan
- In office June 30, 1992 – June 30, 1995
- Mayor: Macario "Boy" Asistio Jr.
- Preceded by: Celestino Rosca
- Succeeded by: Nancy Quimpo

Member of the Caloocan City Council
- In office June 30, 1988 – June 30, 1992

Personal details
- Born: May 17, 1952 (age 74) Caloocan, Philippines
- Party: KANP (2024–present)
- Other political affiliations: PRP (1992); NPC (2010)
- Spouse: Gwendolyn Yee Emnace
- Children: 2, including PJ
- Occupation: Actor, martial artist

Reynaldo Oliver Malonzo (born May 17, 1952), professionally known as Rey Malonzo, is a former Filipino actor, film director and politician in the Philippines. He was a famous action star doing mostly martial arts in his films during the 1970s up to the 1980s. Malonzo served as mayor of Caloocan from 1995 to 2004, the city vice mayor from 1992 to 1995, and city councilor from 1998 to 1992.

== Education ==
Malonzo graduated with a degree in police science from the Pamantasan ng Lungsod ng Maynila.

== Film career ==
In the 1970s, Malonzo rose to popularity by way of kung fu and karate movies. Malonzo, together with Ramon Zamora gave rise to the so-called Pinoy Bruce Lee clones in the late 1970s. They starred in such films as Bruce Liit (1978) with Niño Muhlach, Ang Hari at ang Alas (1978), The Deadly Rookies (1978) with Rio Locsin and Kambal Dragon (1978). He did also a string of martial arts films including Chaku Master in 1974, and They Call Him Bruce Lee in 1979. In the 1980s, he became a director using his alternate name, Reginald King in his films, Pedrong Palaka (1980), Tigre ng Sierra Madre (1982), Roman Sebastian (1983), and Maestro Bandido (1983) among others. In 1987, he starred with American actors David Anderson, Brett Baxter Clark, and Robert Patrick for the film Eye of the Eagle.

In 2000, Malonzo portrayed Andrés Bonifacio in the television film Pag-ibig sa Tinubuang Lupa, directed by Lorli Villanueva. It was later intended to be reshot and entered into the 2003 Metro Manila Film Festival, but the plan did not come to fruition.

In 2019, he returned to television via FPJ's Ang Probinsyano and on 2026 for Coco Martin's Sigabo with actor and director Coco Martin.

== Political career ==
Malonzo served as councilor of Caloocan from 1988 to 1992. He later ran for vice mayor of Caloocan in 1992 under the People's Reform Party (PRP) alongside mayoral candidate Tomas Teodoro, with the two receiving the endorsement of PRP presidential candidate Miriam Defensor Santiago. Malonzo won the election and defeated incumbent vice mayor Celestino Rosca, while Teodoro ultimately lost to incumbent mayor Macario "Boy" Asistio Jr. of the Liping Kalookan party.

Malonzo became a mayor for three consecutive terms in Caloocan. In 1995, he ran for mayor and defeated Macario 'Boy' Asistio. A year later, Asistio loyalists filed a recall petition against Malonzo. A recall election was conducted, and Malonzo still emerged as the winner. He was reelected as mayor in the 1998 polls. In 2001, Malonzo won a third term, this time against former Congressman Luis Asistio. Upon being term limited, he ran for representative of the 1st district of Caloocan in 2004, but lost to former vice mayor Oscar Malapitan. He later ran for vice mayor of Caloocan in 2010 as Asistio's running mate, but lost to former 2nd district representative Edgar Erice.

In 2023, Malonzo announced that he would run for councilor of San Simon, Pampanga, citing his roots in its barangay San Pedro. However, in 2024, he decided to run for representative of the 1st district of Caloocan instead, following his support for the 2025 Caloocan mayoral run of former senator Antonio Trillanes IV, with whom his son PJ is the running mate for vice mayor. However, he lost the congressional race to Malapitan once again.

== Personal life ==
Malonzo is married to fellow actress Gwendolyn "Gigi" Emnace. They have two children: Christopher "PJ" Malonzo and Charles King Malonzo.

== Filmography ==
=== Film ===
Year	Title
1973	The Radical Boxer Challenges the Big Boss
1973	The Prodigal Sons
1974	Raging Fists
1974	Chaku Master
1974	Matador
1975	Eagle and the Flower
1975	Stowaway
1976	Kuntao
1976	Shaolin Master
1977	Cortes
1977	The Magnificent 3
1977	Leon Montera
1977	Golden Chaku
1977	Homicide
1977	Games of Bruce
1977	Karate Kung Fu Shaolin Masters
1978	Ang Mabait, ang Masungit at ang Pangit
1978	Kambal Dragon
1978	Doble Kara
1978	Ang Hari at ang Alas
1978	Bruce Liit
1978	Born Fighter
1978	Shanghai Joe
1978	Cobra, Lawin at Dragon
1978	Adan Crisologo: Wanted For Murder
1978	Mga Mata ni Angelita
1978	Target Shaolin Master
1978	Manila Chinatown
1978	The Deadly Rookies
1978	Bruce Volcanic Kicks
1978	Ang Huling Lalaki ng Baluarte
1979	Showdown of Martial Arts
1979	Ang Tsimay at ang Tambay
1979	Imposibleng Dalawa
1979	The Tiger and the Lady
1979	Kungfu Triangle
1979	Abel at Cain
1979	Angelita... Ako ang Iyong Ina
1979	They Call Him Bruce Lee
1979	Twin Fists for the Black Masters
1979	Final Showdown
1979	Experts
1979	Deadly Fighters
1979	Tsikiting Master
1979	Ang Agimat ni Pepe
1980	Kodigo Penal: The Valderrama Case
1980	Pinoy Boxer
1980	Pedrong Palaka
1980	Pangkat Do or Die
1980	Boy Singkit
1980	Hepe
1980	Batang North Harbor
1980	Mga Patapon
1981	Kalabang Mortal
1981	Firecracker
1981	Hepe Goes to War
1981	Deadly Commandos
1981	Limbas ng Cavite
1982	Suicide Force
1982	Tigre ng Sierra Madre
1982	Walang Atrasan
1982	Task Force Alamid
1982	Assault Squad Skorpio
1982	Kumander .45
1982	Man to Man
1983	Roman Sebastian
1983	Maestro Bandido
1983	Walang Duwag Na Pilipino
1983	Surigao Tragedy
1983	D' Godson
1984	Search for Vengeance
1984	Hatulan si Baby Angustia
1984	Tatak Vengador
1985	Hatulan si... Jun Bastardo
1985	Ulo ng Gang-Ho: Viong ng Sampaloc
1985	Grease Gun Brothers
1986	Tatakas Ako... Ubos Kayo!
1986	Women of Valor
1986	Kontra Bandido
1987	Behind Enemy Lines
1987	Eye of the Eagle
1987	Mga Agila ng Arkong Bato
1988	Classified Operation
1988	War Camp
2003	When Eagles Strike
2006	The Hunt for Eagle One

=== Television ===
Year	Title	Role	Notes
2000	Pag-ibig sa Tinubuang Lupa	Andrés Bonifacio	Lead role Television film
2019	FPJ's Ang Probinsyano	PMGen. Manuel dela Cruz	Guest
2023	Family Feud	Himself	Contestant
2026	Coco Martin's Sigabo	PMGen. Duran	Guest

== See also ==
- Caloocan
- 2010 Caloocan local elections
