= Caloocan's 3rd congressional district =

Legislative district in the Philippines' House of Representatives

- Constituency for the House of Representatives of the Philippines
- Map
- Location of Caloocan within Metro Manila
- City: Caloocan
- Region: Metro Manila
- Population: 327,769 (2020)
- Electorate: 124,219 (2022)
- Major settlements: 11 barangays: Barangays 178–188
- Area: 11.53 km^{2} (4.45 sq mi)

Current constituency
- Created: 2021
- Representative: Dean Asistio
- Political party: NUP
- Congressional bloc: Majority

Caloocan's 3rd congressional district is one of the three congressional districts of the Philippines in the city of Caloocan. It has been represented in the House of Representatives of the Philippines since 2022. The district consists of eleven barangays in the northeastern portion of Caloocan: Barangays 178 to 188 in Zone 16, all previously part of the first district from its creation in 1987 until 2021, when Republic Act No. 11545 was signed into law. It is currently represented in the 20th Congress by Dean Asistio of the National Unity Party (NUP), who is its first representative since its creation.

== Representation history ==
#	Member		Term of office		Congress	Party	Electoral history	Constituent LGUs
#	Image	Name	Start	End	Congress	Party	Electoral history	Constituent LGUs
=== Caloocan's 3rd district for the House of Representatives of the Philippines ===
District created May 23, 2021 from Caloocan's 1st district.
1		Dean Asistio	June 30, 2022	Incumbent	19th	Lakas	Elected in 2022.	2022–present Barangays 178–188
1		Dean Asistio	June 30, 2022	Incumbent	20th	NUP	Re-elected in 2025.	2022–present Barangays 178–188

== Election results ==
=== 2025 ===
2025 Philippine House of Representatives election in Caloocan's 3rd district
Candidate	Party	Votes	%
Dean Asistio (incumbent)	Lakas–CMD	93,708	100.00
Total		93,708	100.00
Lakas–CMD hold			

=== 2022 ===
2022 Philippine House of Representatives election in Caloocan's Third District
Party	Candidate	Votes	%
PDP–Laban	Dean Asistio	54,319	55.79
PDDS	Enrico "Recom" Echiverri	43,044	44.21
Total votes		97,363	100.00
PDP–Laban win (new seat)			

== See also ==
- Legislative districts of Caloocan
