= Edgar Erice =

Filipino politician and businessman (born 1960)

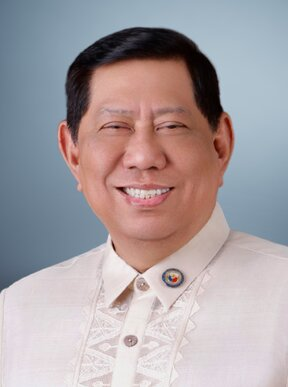
- Official portrait, 2026

Member of the Philippine House of Representatives from Caloocan's 2nd congressional district
- Incumbent
- Assumed office June 30, 2025
- Preceded by: Mitch Cajayon
- In office June 30, 2013 – June 30, 2022
- Preceded by: Mitch Cajayon
- Succeeded by: Mitch Cajayon
- In office June 30, 2001 – June 30, 2004
- Preceded by: Luis Asistio
- Succeeded by: Luis Asistio

House Senior Deputy Minority Leader
- In office July 30, 2025 – March 3, 2026
- Leader: Marcelino Libanan
- Preceded by: Paul Daza
- Succeeded by: Leila De Lima

Vice Mayor of Caloocan
- In office June 30, 2010 – June 30, 2013
- Mayor: Enrico Echiverri
- Preceded by: Tito Varela
- Succeeded by: Luis Macario Asistio

Member of the Caloocan City Council
- In office June 30, 1995 – June 30, 2001

Personal details
- Born: Edgar Ranes Erice; June 15, 1960 (age 66) Quezon City, Philippines
- Party: Liberal (1988–1992; 2003–2021; 2024–present)
- Other political affiliations: Aksyon (2021–2024); Lakas (1992–2003)
- Spouse: Rosalie Villarico Erice
- Education: University of Santo Tomas (BA)
- Occupation: Public Servant and Founder and President of Egay R. Erice Foundation Inc.
- Profession: Businessman

Edgar "Egay" Ranes Erice (born June 15, 1960) is a Filipino politician and businessman who currently serves as the representative for Caloocan's second congressional district since 2025, previously holding the seat from 2001 to 2004 and from 2013 to 2022. Erice ran for mayor of Caloocan in 2022 and lost to fellow representative Along Malapitan.

He was the regional chairman of Aksyon Demokratiko for the National Capital Region from 2021 to 2024, but he quit from the party and returned to Liberal Party in 2024.

== Early life and education ==
Erice took up secondary education at Caloocan High School from 1973 to 1977 and earned his Bachelor of Arts in Political Science at University of Santo Tomas as a beneficiary of "Study-now, Pay-Later Plan" of Caloocan.

Furthermore, Erice was a leader of the Liberal Party of the Philippines for 18 years (since 1988). He was the Regional Chairman for National Capital Region of Aksyon Demokratiko and the Past President of the Rotary Club of Caloocan District 3800 and a past navigator of Andres Bonifacio Assembly – Knights of Columbus.

== Political career ==
=== Caloocan President of Kabataang Barangay (1975) ===
Erice first came to public service in 1975, when he became part of Kabataang Barangay Chairman (now known as Sangguniang Kabataan) at the age of 15. He was the President of the Kabataang Barangay for Caloocan from 1975 to 1981.

=== Administrative roles (1980–1992) ===
From 1980 to 1982, Erice served as Administrative Officer I at the Metro Manila Commission (MMC). He then became the MMC's Plans and Programs Officer from 1982 to 1984. Between 1984 and 1986, he was the Chief of Research and Statistics Office of MMC.

In 1986, he was appointed Area Manager for the Environmental Sanitation Center in Caloocan. He later transitioned to national level, being named as the Chief of Staff to Caloocan 1st district Representative Virgilio Robles in 1989. Robles was later ousted in 1991 as a result of an electoral protest.

=== Caloocan city council member (1995–2001) ===
Erice was elected member of the Caloocan City Council in 1995 at the age of 35. He was re-elected to a second term in 1998.

=== Congressional stint (2001–2004) ===
Erice decided not to seek re-election for councilor in 2001 and instead ran for representative of Caloocan's 2nd congressional district in 2001. He won, serving for one term until 2004. In 2004, he ran for mayor of Caloocan under the Liberal Party but lost to 1st district Representative Enrico Echiverri.

=== 2007 Congressional bid ===
In 2007, Erice attempted a comeback to the Congress, but lost to incumbent Mitzi Cajayon.

=== Vice Mayor of Caloocan under Mayor Echiverri (2010–2013) ===
Erice ran for vice-mayor in the 2010 elections under the Liberal Party-coalition of Mayor Enrico Echiverri. He was elected, defeating former Mayor Rey Malonzo who was the running mate of Luis Asistio. He was also the President of the Vice Mayors' League of the Philippines that time and Director of Metro Manila Development Council. He would serve for only one term until 2013.

=== Congressional stint (2013–2022) ===
Initially planning to run for Mayor of Caloocan, Erice ran for representative of Caloocan's 2nd congressional district in 2013 under the Liberal Party and won, defeating incumbent Mitzi Cajayon. He was re-elected in 2016 and in 2019.

He ran again for mayor in 2022 under Aksyon Demokratiko, which he said would be his last political run, but lost to 1st district Representative Along Malapitan, son of outgoing Mayor Oscar Malapitan.

=== Controversies ===
In July 2024, the Supreme Court en banc directed Erice to file comment on the confidentiality and protective gag order motion filed by Miru Systems joint venture on the 2025 Philippine general election case. Earlier, Erice filed a certiorari case versus the ₱18-billion contract awarded by the COMELEC to Miru Systems. Erice also filed a motion with the Supreme Court to cite Chairman George Garcia in contempt of court for violation of the sub judice rule alleging Garcia's prohibited remarks on the pending case.

In August 2024, Angelo Balatbat and Raymond Salipot filed a joint complaint-affidavit against Erice at the Comelec Law Department. The lawsuit petitioned for a preliminary investigation based on his alleged false claims and information regarding Comelec and Miru Systems.

In November, Garcia in his memorandum recused from all lawsuits before the COMELEC against Erice based on Rule 4, Section 1(c), 1993 Comelec Rules of Procedure.

=== Congressional stint (2025–present) ===
Erice filed his candidacy to run again as congressman in Caloocan's second district in 2025. On November 27, 2024, he was disqualified by the Comelec Second Division for "propagating false information across multiple platforms" in relation for his accusations against Comelec and Miru Systems. The decision was affirmed by the Comelec en banc on December 27. In January 2025, however, the Supreme Court issued a TRO in favor of Erice against the disqualification. Erice later won the election, defeating incumbent Mitch Cajayon-Uy once again, while his disqualification was overturned by the Supreme Court in July 2025.

On July 30, 2025, Erice was named as the Senior House Deputy Minority Leader for the 20th Congress. He was later replaced by Leila De Lima on March 3, 2026.
