= Oscar Malapitan =

Filipino politician (born 1955)

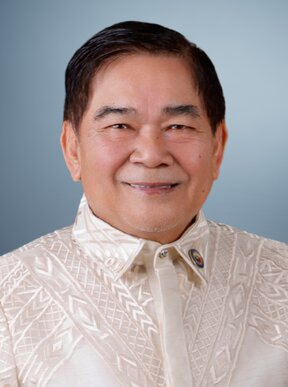
- Official portrait, 2026

Member of the Philippine House of Representatives from Caloocan's 1st congressional district
- Incumbent
- Assumed office June 30, 2022
- Preceded by: Dale Gonzalo Malapitan
- In office June 30, 2004 – June 30, 2013
- Preceded by: Enrico Echiverri
- Succeeded by: Enrico Echiverri

25th Mayor of Caloocan
- In office June 30, 2013 – June 30, 2022
- Vice Mayor: Luis Macario Asistio III
- Preceded by: Enrico Echiverri
- Succeeded by: Dale Gonzalo Malapitan

Vice Mayor of Caloocan
- In office June 30, 1998 – June 30, 2001
- Mayor: Rey Malonzo
- Preceded by: Nancy Quimpo
- Succeeded by: Luis Varela

Member of the Caloocan City Council from the 1st district
- In office June 30, 1992 – June 30, 1998

Personal details
- Born: Oscar Gonzales Malapitan; June 14, 1955 (age 71) Quezon City, Philippines
- Party: Nacionalista (2004–2012; 2015–present); Tao Ang Una (local party)
- Other political affiliations: UNA (2012–2015); NPC (1992–2004)
- Spouse: Edna Rigor Malapitan
- Children: 3, including Along
- Occupation: Politician

Oscar "Oca" Gonzales Malapitan (born June 14, 1955) is a Filipino politician who currently serves as the representative from the 1st District of Caloocan in the House of Representatives of the Philippines since 2022 and previously from 2004 to 2013. He also served as Mayor of Caloocan from 2013 to 2022, Vice Mayor of Caloocan from 2001 to 2004, and City Councilor from 1992 to 1998. He also unsuccessfully ran for representative in 2001. He is currently a member of the Nacionalista Party.

== Early life ==
Malapitan was born on June 14, 1955, in Quezon City to Col. Vicente Malapitan and Josefina Gonzales.

== Political career ==
=== Councilor of Caloocan (1992–1998) ===
Oscar Malapitan served as city councilor of Caloocan for two consecutive terms from 1992 to 1998. As councilor, he sponsored a 1996 resolution stating that Caloocan should begin with the letter "C" instead of "K" as written in historical documents.

=== Vice Mayor of Caloocan (1998–2001) ===
After two terms as councilor, he was elected vice mayor in 1998, serving one term. It was during this period when he removed his support for Mayor Rey Malonzo in 2000 due to accusations from city council members that Malapitan is "[ignorant] of parliamentary procedures". As a supporter of President Joseph Estrada, Malapitan later accused Malonzo of sending him "insulting" text messages after Estrada was ousted by EDSA II in January 2001.

That same year, he attempted to run for congress as representative of Caloocan's 1st District, but lost to re-electionist Enrico Echiverri.

=== Representative (2004–2013) ===
However, Malapitan later defeated Mayor Malonzo for representative of Caloocan's 1st District in 2004, eventually serving three consecutive terms as congressman until 2013.

As representative, Malapitan pushed for the renovation of Dr. Jose N. Rodriguez Memorial Hospital to become a tertiary-level hospital, the establishment of Caloocan National Science and Technology High School, and the establishment of four new branches of the Metropolitan Trial Court at Caloocan.

=== Mayor of Caloocan (2013–2022) ===
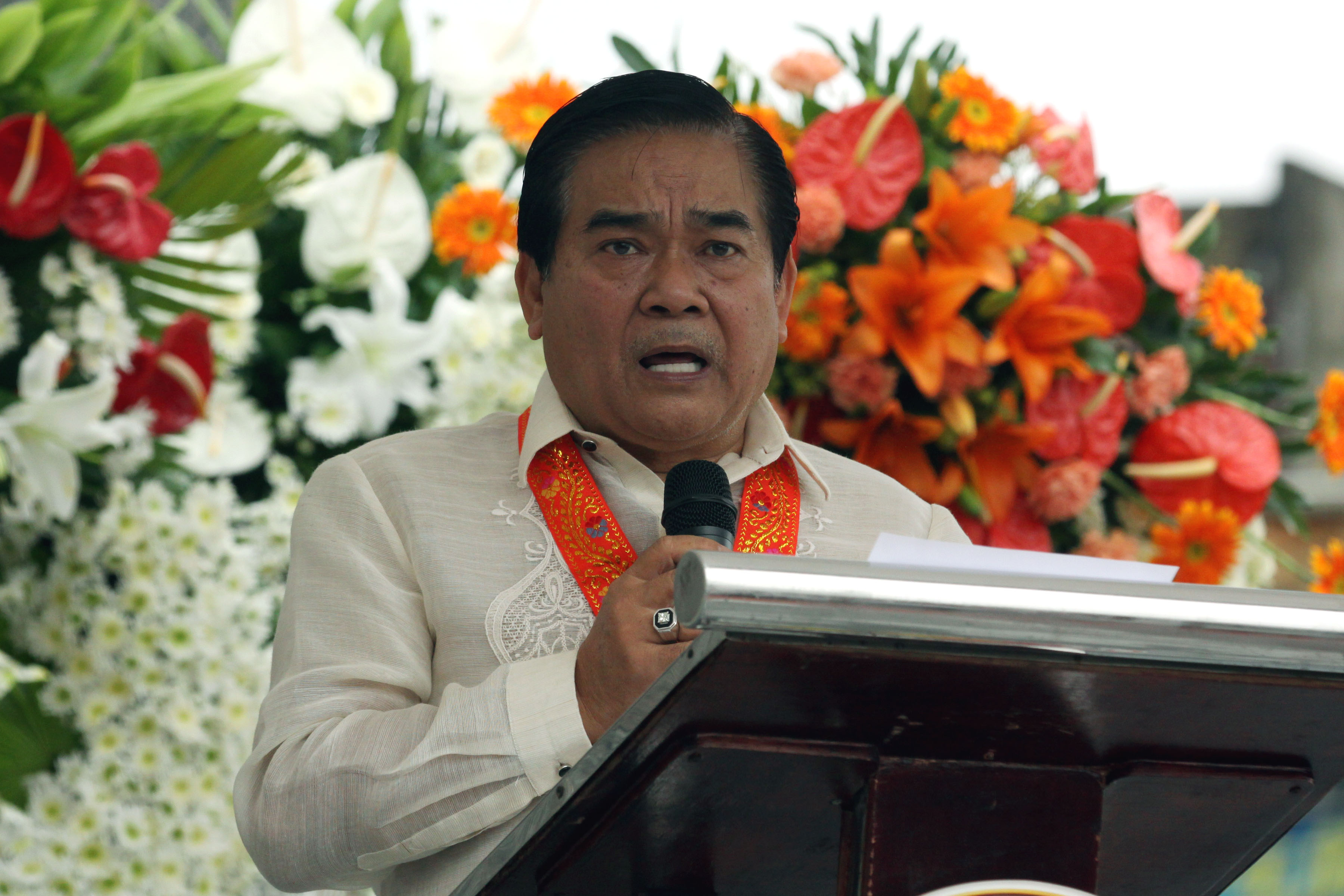
Malapitan during Independence Day 2018

Malapitan ran for and won the mayoral position in 2013, promising to improve Caloocan's health care and education in a similar manner to Jejomar Binay's mayorship in Makati.

Throughout his incumbency, Malapitan regularly boasted of a decreased crime rate in Caloocan. However, the Peace Research Institute Frankfurt (PRIF) noted in 2020 that Malapitan's mayorship was characterized with a passivity towards President Rodrigo Duterte's war on drugs during its first year (2016–2017), with Malapitan asking the local branch of the Philippine National Police (PNP) to take charge of crime control and work vigorously against illegal drugs, which PRIF claimed to have "resulted in a huge spike of deadly police violence" and "excessive levels of vigilantism" during this period. Many of the high-profile incidents in Duterte's national drug war occurred in Caloocan, including the murders of Luis Bonifacio and his son Gabriel in 2016 and the murders of Kian delos Santos, Carl Arnaiz and Reynaldo de Guzman in 2017. By September 2017, Caloocan's entire police force was relieved from duty by PNP Chief Oscar Albayalde, despite it receiving the award for Metro Manila's Best City Police Station from the National Capital Region Police Office (NCRPO) a month earlier; only newly assigned police chief Jemar Modequillo and his administration deputy were retained.

Sometime in 2017, Bishop Pablo Virgilio David of the Diocese of Kalookan met with Malapitan, Modequillo and lawyer Sikini Labastilla, all three of whom are members of the Caloocan City Anti-Drug Abuse Council (CADAC), to discuss how to better facilitate rehabilitation and drug prevention in the city during the drug war, which lead to the establishment of the Caloocan Anti-Drug Abuse Office (CADAO) the following year.

Malapitan would come to serve out three consecutive terms as mayor, with his son Along Malapitan succeeding him.

=== Representative (2022–present) ===
In 2022, Malapitan ran for representative of Caloocan's 1st District once again and won, switching places with his son Along. During the 19th Congress, he served as the chair of the House Committee on National Defense and Security and vice chair of the House Committee on Local Government and of House Committee on Metro Manila Development. He was re-elected in 2025. In the 20th Congress, he then continued to chair the House Committee on National Defense and Security.

== Controversies ==
=== Graft ===
In 2009, Malapitan was accused of misusing his Priority Development Assistance Fund (PDAF), amounting to ₱8 million allocated to the Kalookan Assistance Council, Inc. (KACI), during his term as representative. The case was later dismissed by the Ombudsman due to lack of evidence. Malapitan was later acquitted by the Supreme Court of the Philippines in 2021 upon the dismissal of a relevant administrative case. However, on July 16, 2024, Rey Malonzo filed a graft and malversation complaint with the Ombudsman against Malapitan, former Social Welfare and Development Secretary Esperanza Cabral, four former Department of Social Welfare and Development (DSWD) officials, and KACI president Cenon Mayor for the same misuse of funds that occurred from 2007 to 2009.

On April 22, 2016, during the campaign period for the local elections, Malapitan was charged of graft and plunder with the Office of the Ombudsman over allegedly overpriced birthday gift packages for senior citizens of Caloocan. Malapitan denied the accusations, stating it has no evidence, and added that the ₱500 senior's social fund, which the complainant claimed she did not receive from the city's social welfare department, was to come from the DSWD.

=== 2024 birthday celebration ===
In June 2024, Rey Malonzo accused Malapitan of reportedly spending at least ₱3 million on his birthday celebration at Solaire Resort & Casino in Parañaque held on June 14 of that same year, drawing scrutiny from local constituents and national figures alike. Malonzo and former senator Antonio Trillanes separately criticized the event as insensitive to Caloocan's poor residents.

== Personal life ==
Malapitan is married to Edna Rigor. Their sons Dale Gonzalo (Along) and Vincent Ryan (Enteng) are also in politics, currently serving as mayor and 1st district councilor of Caloocan, respectively. Their daughter, Sharon Faye Malapitan Bautista, has been a board director of the Clark Development Corporation since 2024.

Political offices
Preceded by Nancy Quimpo	Vice Mayor of Caloocan; 1998–2001	Succeeded by Luis Varela
Preceded by Enrico Echiverri	Mayor of Caloocan; 2013–2022	Succeeded by Along Malapitan
House of Representatives of the Philippines
Preceded by Enrico Echiverri	Representative, 1st District of Caloocan; 2004–2013	Succeeded by Enrico Echiverri
Preceded by Along Malapitan	Representative, 1st District of Caloocan; 2022–present	Incumbent
