= Along Malapitan =

Filipino politician (born 1979)

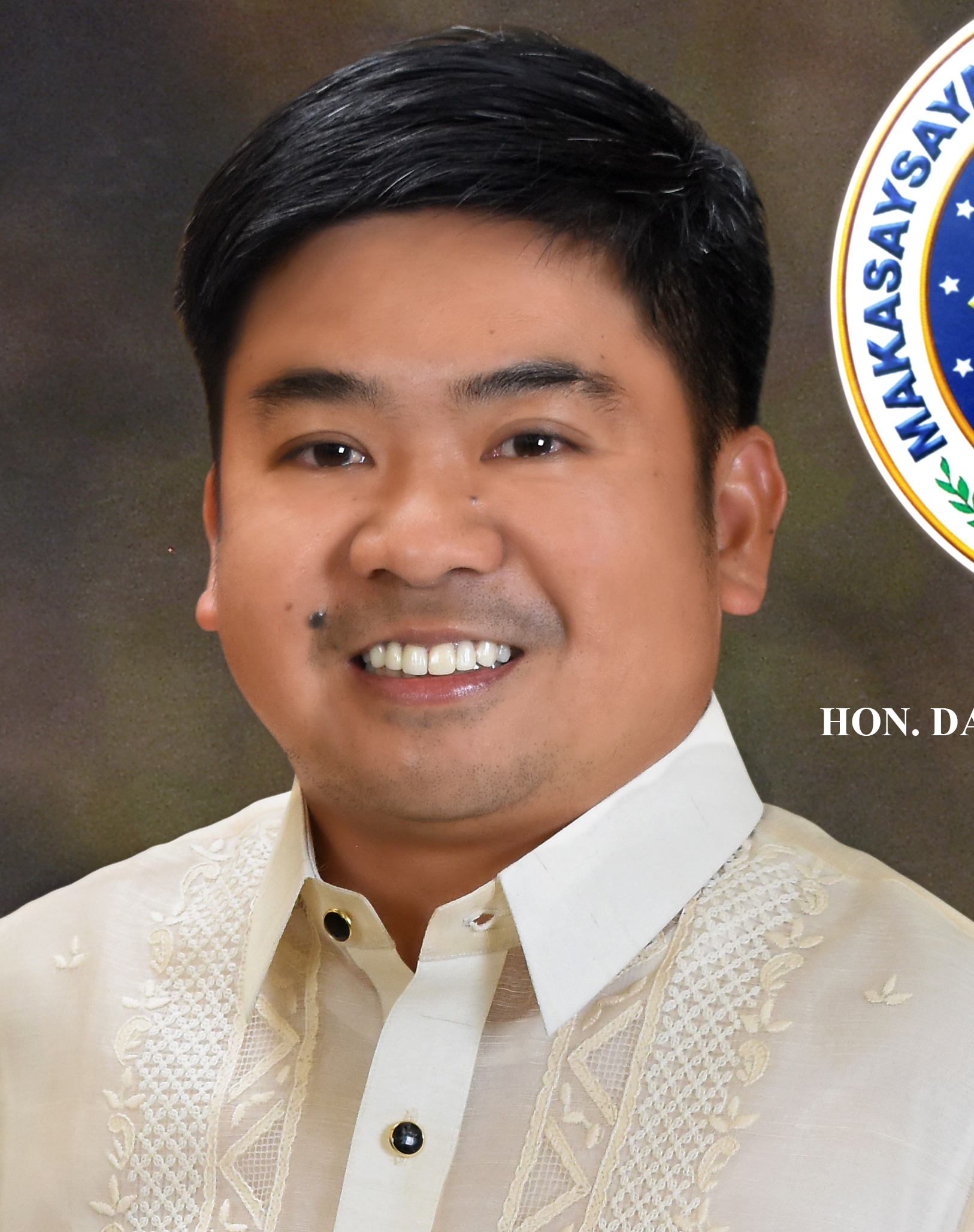
- Official portrait, 2022

26th Mayor of Caloocan
- Incumbent
- Assumed office June 30, 2022
- Vice Mayor: Karina Teh-Limsico
- Preceded by: Oscar Malapitan

Member of the House of Representatives of the Philippines from Caloocan's 1st congressional district
- In office June 30, 2016 – June 30, 2022
- Preceded by: Enrico Echiverri
- Succeeded by: Oscar Malapitan

Member of the Caloocan City Council from the 1st district
- In office June 30, 2010 – June 30, 2013

Captain of Barangay 137, Caloocan
- In office November 30, 2013 – June 30, 2016
- Preceded by: Sharon Faye Malapitan-Bautista
- Succeeded by: Cita Montes
- In office November 30, 2007 – June 30, 2010
- Succeeded by: Sharon Faye Malapitan-Bautista

Personal details
- Born: Dale Gonzalo Rigor Malapitan; October 31, 1979 (age 47) Quezon City, Philippines
- Party: Nacionalista (2009–2012; 2024–present)
- Other political affiliations: PDP (2016–2024); Liberal (2015–2016); UNA (2012–2015)
- Spouse: Aubrey Narciso
- Children: 2
- Parents: Oscar Malapitan (father); Edna Rigor (mother)
- Education: Colegio de San Juan de Letran
- Occupation: Politician

Dale Gonzalo "Along" Rigor Malapitan (born October 31, 1979) is a Filipino politician currently serving as the Mayor of Caloocan since 2022. He previously served as the representative of the first district of Caloocan from 2016 to 2022.

== Early life and education ==
Malapitan was born on October 31, 1979, to Oscar "Oca" Malapitan and Edna Rigor. His brother and sister, Vincent Ryan ("Enteng") and Sharon Faye, also entered politics.

He studied elementary at Notre Dame of Greater Manila, high school at School of Divine Mercy, and college at Colegio de San Juan de Letran.

== Political career ==
=== Barangay chairman, Barangay 137, Caloocan (2007–2010) ===
Malapitan was elected chairman of Barangay 137 in Bagong Barrio West, Caloocan in 2007.

=== Councilor, First District of Caloocan (2010–2013) ===
He was elected member of the Caloocan City Council in 2010. He served for one term.

=== Congressional attempt (2013) ===
After one term as councilor, he ran for representative of Caloocan's first district in 2013, but lost to then-outgoing mayor Enrico "Recom" Echiverri.

=== Barangay chairman and Liga ng mga Barangay President of Caloocan (2013–2016) ===
After his loss in the congressional elections, he was elected to another term as chair of Barangay 137 in Bagong Barrio West and later elected as ex-officio councilor as President of Liga ng mga Barangay during the mayoral term of his father Oscar.

=== Representative, First District (2016–2022) ===
After three years, he ran again in the same position and won. He ran for re-election in 2019 and won unopposed.

=== Mayor, Caloocan (2022–present) ===
Although eligible for re-election, Malapitan ran as mayor instead, switching place with his father then-Mayor Oscar "Oca" Malapitan who was term-limited. He ran with the campaign slogan Aksyon at Malasakit (lit. transl. Action and Care) after his initials with nickname. He won the elections, succeeding his father. He ran for re-election in 2025.

== Personal life ==
Malapitan is married to Aubrey Narciso-Malapitan, a doctor and an incumbent board member of the Association of Nutrition Action Officers in NCR, Inc., with whom he has a son and a daughter. His younger brother, Vincent Ryan, is an incumbent 1st district councilor of Caloocan, while his sister, Sharon Faye, is a former Barangay 137 chair and an incumbent board director of the Clark Development Corporation.

== Electoral history ==
Electoral history of Along Malapitan
| Year | Office | Party | Votes received | | | | Result |
| Year | Office | Party | Total | % | P. | Swing | Result |
|---|---|---|---|---|---|---|---|
| 2010 | Councilor (Caloocan–1st) | Nacionalista | 132,123 | 10.38% | 1st | —N/a | Won |
| 2013 | Representative (Caloocan–1st) | UNA | 113,453 | 42.09% | 2nd | —N/a | Lost |
| 2016 | Representative (Caloocan–1st) | Liberal | 215,639 | 68.49% | 1st | +26.40 | Won |
| 2019 | Representative (Caloocan–1st) | PDP–Laban | 284,851 | 100.00% | 1st | +31.51 | Unopposed |
| 2022 | Mayor of Caloocan | PDP–Laban | 314,903 | 56.13% | 1st | —N/a | Won |
| 2025 | Mayor of Caloocan | Nacionalista | 348,211 | 59.49% | 1st | +3.36 | Won |

== Controversies ==
=== Rape case ===
On April 28, 2008, Malapitan, then chair of Barangay 137, Caloocan, was charged with the rape of two underage girls in Barangay 137, along with his uncle Mariano and six other barangay officials before the office of Caloocan assistant prosecutor Darwin Cañete. The charges alleged that on the evening of April 12, a 16-year-old girl and her 14-year-old cousin were caught violating a curfew for minors by barangay watchmen and were brought to the barangay hall, where they claimed to have been forced to drink liquor by Malapitan and have sexual intercourse with him in the comfort room lest they be brought to the police and put in jail instead. A parent of one of the girls claimed to have later met an alleged aide of representative Oscar Malapitan, Along's father, on April 21 who gave the girls ₱20,000 (equivalent to ₱30,093 in 2021) each as hush money for the incident, though the parents proceeded to report the incident to the police on April 26. The two girls were thus placed under the protective custody of the Department of Social Welfare and Development (DSWD), which helped provide them counseling and legal services.

The Caloocan City Regional Trial Court 131 began hearing the People v. Malapitan, et al. case in 2008, but later dismissed it in 2011 without informing the victims of the reason for dismissal. In April 2013, the elder victim (with the alias "Mila") and lawyer Trixie Cruz-Angeles attempted to revive the case against Malapitan, to no avail. Malapitan has repeatedly denied the allegations. After Malapitan was elected mayor in 2022, he announced a "zero tolerance" policy to heinous crimes such as rape committed in Caloocan.

=== Vote-buying allegation ===
On April 24, 2025, the Commission on Elections (COMELEC) Kontra Bigay committee issued show cause orders against Malapitan and other local candidates over alleged vote-buying activities surrounding their campaign.
