= Boy Asistio =

Philippine politician (1936 – 2017)

Macario "Boy" Asistio Jr.

21st & 22nd Mayor of Caloocan
- In office February 2, 1988 – June 30, 1995
- Vice Mayor: Celestino Rosca (1988–1992); Rey Malonzo (1992–1995)
- Preceded by: Crispulo San Gabriel (acting)
- Succeeded by: Rey Malonzo
- In office January 7, 1980 – April 20, 1986
- Vice Mayor: Macario Ramirez Sr.
- Preceded by: Virgilio Robles
- Succeeded by: Antonio Martinez (acting)

Member of the Caloocan City Council
- In office December 30, 1967 – December 30, 1971

Personal details
- Born: Macario A. Asistio Jr. April 6, 1936 Tondo, Manila, Philippines
- Died: February 6, 2017 (aged 80) Antipolo, Rizal, Philippines
- Resting place: Eternal Gardens Memorial Park, Baesa, Caloocan
- Party: Independent
- Other political affiliations: Liping Kalookan (1987–2004); Nacionalista (1967–1971)
- Spouse: Jhoanna Garcia (m. 1974; sep. 1990)
- Domestic partners: Nadia Montenegro (1990–2010s); Veronica Jones (1980s–2010s)
- Relations: Luis "Baby" Asistio (brother); Aurora "Nene" Asistio-Henson (sister)
- Children: 21, inc. Alynna
- Parent: Macario Asistio Sr.

Macario "Boy" Aquino Asistio Jr. (April 6, 1936 – February 6, 2017) was the mayor of Caloocan in Metro Manila, Philippines for 13 non-consecutive years, from 1980 to 1986 and 1988 to 1995. Asistio unsuccessfully ran for mayor again in 1998, 2004, 2013 and 2016.

In July 1986, Asistio participated in a coup attempt against the Aquino administration at the Manila Hotel.

== Political career ==
Asistio was elected councilor of Caloocan in 1967 under the Nacionalista Party.

In July 1986, five months after the People Power Revolution overthrew President Ferdinand Marcos and resulted in Asistio's removal as Caloocan mayor, Asistio participated in a coup attempt led by Arturo Tolentino against the administration of President Corazon Aquino, in which soldiers briefly occupied the Manila Hotel.

== Personal life ==
Asistio was born on April 6, 1936 to politician Macario Asistio Sr., who was mayor of Caloocan from 1951 to 1971, and Asuncion Aquino. His siblings include Luis ("Baby"; 1937–), Aurora Sr. (1939–) and Alita.

Asistio married singer Jhoanna "Giji" Garcia on April 21, 1974, and had two children: Adelaide ("Lady") and Alexis. Giji, as the wife of Mayor Asistio, was noted to have headed the Santacruzan activity in Caloocan and actively engaged in the city's charity projects by the mid-1980s. The two separated in 1990 due to Asistio's extramarital affairs.

Asistio also had five children with Veronica Jones: Abbigail (known as Abby, a singer) Anna, Angelica, Arriane, and Macario III, and eight children with Nadia Montenegro: Alyssa Assandra, Alynna Alexandra or Alynna, Alyana Alissandra, Anykka Allandra, Alexander, Samantha Grace, Yisha, and Sophia. Asistio had another six children with four more ex-partners.

=== Health and death ===
Asistio had suffered from sleep apnea in June 2013 and was admitted to a hospital.

He died on 6 February 2017 at the age of 80 at the Metro Antipolo Hospital and Medical Center. He was in coma and was admitted to the intensive care unit.
