= Caloocan's 1st congressional district =

Legislative district in the Philippines' House of Representatives

- Constituency for the House of Representatives of the Philippines
- Map
- Location of Caloocan within Metro Manila
- City: Caloocan
- Region: Metro Manila
- Population: 953,125 (2020)
- Electorate: 377,294 (2025)
- Major settlements: 64 barangays: Barangays 1–4; Barangays 77–85; Barangays 132–175; Barangays 176-A, 176-B, 176-C, 176-D, 176-E, 176-F; Barangay 177
- Area: 34.86 km^{2} (13.46 sq mi)

Current constituency
- Created: 1987
- Representative: Oscar Malapitan
- Political party: Nacionalista Party
- Congressional bloc: Majority

Caloocan's 1st congressional district, also known as North Caloocan district, is one of the three congressional districts of the Philippines in the city of Caloocan. It has been represented in the House of Representatives of the Philippines since 1987. The district consists mostly of the North Caloocan barangays north of EDSA and Circumferential Road 4: Barangays 1 to 4 of Zone 1, Barangays 77 to 85 in Zones 7 and 8, and Barangays 132 to 177 in Zones 12 to 15. It also included Barangays 178 to 188 in Zones 15 and 16 in the northern portion of Caloocan until their redistricting to the third district that took effect in 2022. It is currently represented in the 20th Congress by Oscar Malapitan of the Nacionalista Party (NP).

== Representation history ==
#	Image	Member	Term of office		Congress	Party	Electoral history	Constituent LGUs
#	Image	Member	Start	End	Congress	Party	Electoral history	Constituent LGUs
=== Caloocan's 1st district for the House of Representatives of the Philippines ===
District created February 2, 1987 from Caloocan's at-large district.
1		Virgilio P. Robles	June 30, 1987	March 6, 1991	8th	UNIDO	Elected in 1987. Removed from office after an electoral protest.	1987–2022; Barangays 1–4, 77–85, 132–188
2		Romeo L. Santos	March 6, 1991	June 30, 1992	8th	Nacionalista	Declared winner of 1987 elections.	1987–2022; Barangays 1–4, 77–85, 132–188
2		Romeo L. Santos	March 6, 1991	June 30, 1992	8th	LDP	Declared winner of 1987 elections.	1987–2022; Barangays 1–4, 77–85, 132–188
3		Aurora Asistio-Henson	June 30, 1992	June 30, 1995	9th	Liping Kalookan	Elected in 1992.	1987–2022; Barangays 1–4, 77–85, 132–188
3		Aurora Asistio-Henson	June 30, 1992	June 30, 1995	9th	NPC	Elected in 1992.	1987–2022; Barangays 1–4, 77–85, 132–188
4		Bobby Guanzon	June 30, 1995	June 30, 1998	10th	Lakas	Elected in 1995.	1987–2022; Barangays 1–4, 77–85, 132–188
5		Enrico Echiverri	June 30, 1998	June 30, 2004	11th	Lakas	Elected in 1998.	1987–2022; Barangays 1–4, 77–85, 132–188
5		Enrico Echiverri	June 30, 1998	June 30, 2004	12th	Lakas	Re-elected in 2001.	1987–2022; Barangays 1–4, 77–85, 132–188
6		Oscar Malapitan	June 30, 2004	June 30, 2013	13th	Nacionalista	Elected in 2004.	1987–2022; Barangays 1–4, 77–85, 132–188
6		Oscar Malapitan	June 30, 2004	June 30, 2013	14th	Nacionalista	Re-elected in 2007.	1987–2022; Barangays 1–4, 77–85, 132–188
6		Oscar Malapitan	June 30, 2004	June 30, 2013	15th	UNA	Re-elected in 2010.	1987–2022; Barangays 1–4, 77–85, 132–188
(5)		Enrico Echiverri	June 30, 2013	June 30, 2016	16th	Liberal	Elected in 2013.	1987–2022; Barangays 1–4, 77–85, 132–188
(5)		Enrico Echiverri	June 30, 2013	June 30, 2016	16th	NPC	Elected in 2013.	1987–2022; Barangays 1–4, 77–85, 132–188
7		Along Malapitan	June 30, 2016	June 30, 2022	17th	PDP–Laban	Elected in 2016.	1987–2022; Barangays 1–4, 77–85, 132–188
7		Along Malapitan	June 30, 2016	June 30, 2022	18th	PDP–Laban	Re-elected in 2019.	1987–2022; Barangays 1–4, 77–85, 132–188
(6)		Oscar Malapitan	June 30, 2022	Incumbent	19th	Nacionalista	Elected in 2022.	2022–2025; Barangays 1–4, 77–85, 132–177
(6)		Oscar Malapitan	June 30, 2022	Incumbent	20th	Nacionalista	Re-elected in 2025.	2025–present Barangays 1–4, 77–85, 132–175, 176-A–176-F, 177

== Election results ==
=== 2025 ===
Congressional Election in Caloocan's First District
Party	Candidate	Votes	%
Nacionalista	Oscar Malapitan	193,468	71.69
KANP	Rey Malonzo	67,976	25.14
Independent	Johram Alama	8,394	3.11
Total votes		269,838	100.00
Nacionalista hold			

=== 2022 ===
Congressional Election in Caloocan's First District
Party	Candidate	Votes	%
Nacionalista	Oscar Malapitan	195,705	74.27
Aksyon	Alou Nubla	63,604	24.14
Independent	Violeta Dela Cruz	4,207	1.60
Total votes		263,516	100.00
Nacionalista gain from PDP–Laban			

=== 2019 ===
2019 Philippine House of Representatives election in Caloocan's 1st District
Party	Candidate	Votes	%
PDP–Laban	Dale Gonzalo Malapitan	284,851	100.0
Valid ballots		284,851	88.2
Invalid or blank votes		38,165	11.8
Total votes		323,016	100.0
PDP–Laban hold			

=== 2016 ===
2016 Philippine House of Representatives election in Caloocan's 1st District
Party	Candidate	Votes	%
Liberal	Dale Gonzalo "Along" Malapitan	215,639	68.49
NPC	Susana Punzalan	90,950	28.89
Independent	Romualdo Orbe	2,996	0.95
PDP–Laban	Garth Gollayan	2,376	0.76
Independent	Violeta dela Cruz	1,744	0.55
Independent	Glenn Openiano	1,160	0.36
Valid ballots		314,865	91.12
Invalid or blank votes		30,694	8.88
Total votes		345,559	100.00
Liberal gain from NPC			

=== 2013 ===
2013 Philippine House of Representatives election at Caloocan's 1st district
Party	Candidate	Votes	%
Liberal	Enrico Echiverri	126,209	46.82
UNA	Dale Gonzalo Malapitan	113,453	42.09
Independent	Roberto Guanzon	10,443	3.87
Independent	Imelda Pengson	374	0.14
Independent	Maria Hernando	364	0.13
Independent	Milagros Libuton	329	0.12
Independent	Sirgea Villamayor	283	0.10
Independent	Sandro Limpin	193	0.07
Margin of victory		12,756	4.73%
Invalid or blank votes		17,904	6.64
Total votes		269,552	100
Liberal gain from UNA			

=== 2010 ===
Philippine House of Representatives election at Caloocan's 1st district
Party	Candidate	Votes	%
Nacionalista	Oscar Malapitan	163,150	60.21
Liberal	Tito Varela	48,333	17.84
Independent	Roberto Guanzon	12,112	4.47
PMP	Ernesto Ray Adalem	10,444	3.85
Independent	Gualberto Bacolod	8,026	2.96
Bangon Pilipinas	Jaime Regalario	2,866	1.06
Valid ballots		244,931	90.39
Invalid or blank votes		26,045	9.61
Total votes		270,976	100.00
Nacionalista hold			

== See also ==
- Legislative districts of Caloocan
