= Caloocan's 2nd congressional district =

Legislative district in the Philippines' House of Representatives

- Constituency for the House of Representatives of the Philippines
- Map
- Location of Caloocan within Metro Manila
- City: Caloocan
- Region: Metro Manila
- Population: 381,690 (2020)
- Electorate: 237,712 (2025)
- Major settlements: 118 barangays: Barangays 5–76; Barangays 86–131
- Area: 7.67 km^{2} (2.96 sq mi)

Current constituency
- Created: 1987
- Representative: Edgar Erice
- Political party: Liberal
- Congressional bloc: Minority

Caloocan's 2nd congressional district, also known as South Caloocan district, is one of the three congressional districts of the Philippines in the city of Caloocan. It has been represented in the House of Representatives of the Philippines since 1987. The district consists of the entire South Caloocan barangays south of Circumferential Road 4 (including EDSA): Barangays 5 to 76 in Zones 1 to 7 and Barangays 86 to 131 in Zones 8 to 11. It is currently represented in the 20th Congress by Edgar Erice of the Liberal Party.

== Representation history ==
#	Image	Member	Term of office		Congress	Party	Electoral history	Constituent LGUs
#	Image	Member	Start	End	Congress	Party	Electoral history	Constituent LGUs
=== Caloocan's 2nd district for the House of Representatives of the Philippines ===
District created February 2, 1987 from Caloocan's at-large district.
1		Gerardo P. Cabochan	June 30, 1987	June 30, 1992	8th	PDP–Laban	Elected in 1987.	1987–present Barangays 5–76, 86–131
2		Luis A. Asistio	June 30, 1992	June 30, 2001	9th	Independent	Elected in 1992.	1987–present Barangays 5–76, 86–131
2		Luis A. Asistio	June 30, 1992	June 30, 2001	10th	NPC	Re-elected in 1995.	1987–present Barangays 5–76, 86–131
2		Luis A. Asistio	June 30, 1992	June 30, 2001	11th	LAMMP	Re-elected in 1998.	1987–present Barangays 5–76, 86–131
3		Edgar Erice	June 30, 2001	June 30, 2004	12th	Lakas	Elected in 2001.	1987–present Barangays 5–76, 86–131
(2)		Luis A. Asistio	June 30, 2004	June 30, 2007	13th	NPC	Elected in 2004.	1987–present Barangays 5–76, 86–131
4		Mary Mitzi L. Cajayon	June 30, 2007	June 30, 2013	14th	Lakas	Elected in 2007.	1987–present Barangays 5–76, 86–131
4		Mary Mitzi L. Cajayon	June 30, 2007	June 30, 2013	15th	NUP	Re-elected in 2010.	1987–present Barangays 5–76, 86–131
(3)		Edgar Erice	June 30, 2013	June 30, 2022	16th	Liberal	Elected in 2013.	1987–present Barangays 5–76, 86–131
(3)		Edgar Erice	June 30, 2013	June 30, 2022	17th	Liberal	Re-elected in 2016.	1987–present Barangays 5–76, 86–131
(3)		Edgar Erice	June 30, 2013	June 30, 2022	18th	Aksyon	Re-elected in 2019.	1987–present Barangays 5–76, 86–131
(4)		Mitch Cajayon-Uy	June 30, 2022	June 30, 2025	19th	PDP–Laban	Elected in 2022.	1987–present Barangays 5–76, 86–131
(4)		Mitch Cajayon-Uy	June 30, 2022	June 30, 2025	19th	Lakas	Elected in 2022.	1987–present Barangays 5–76, 86–131
(3)		Edgar Erice	June 30, 2025	Incumbent	20th	Liberal	Elected in 2025.	1987–present Barangays 5–76, 86–131

== Election results ==
=== 2025 ===
Congressional Election in Caloocan's Second District
Party	Candidate	Votes	%
Liberal	Edgar Erice	104,049	58.10
Lakas	Mitch Cajayon-Uy	75,016	41.94
Total votes		179,065	100.00
Liberal gain from Lakas			

=== 2022 ===
Congressional Election in Caloocan's Second District
Party	Candidate	Votes	%
PDP–Laban	Mary Mitzi "Mitch" Cajayon-Uy	63,669	35.20
Lakas	Roberto "Obet" Samson	41,057	22.70
NPC	Luis Macario "Maca" Asistio	28,603	15.81
Reporma	Alexander "Alex" Mangasar	26,870	14.86
Aksyon	Jacob Reuben Cabochan	20,672	11.43
Total votes		180,871	100.00
PDP–Laban gain from Aksyon			

=== 2019 ===
Congressional Election for Caloocan's Second District
Party	Candidate	Votes	%
Liberal	Edgar "Egay" Erice	124,223	90.30
NUP	Noel Cabuhat	13,349	9.70
Total votes		137,572	100.00
Liberal hold			

=== 2016 ===
2016 Philippine House of Representatives election in Caloocan's 2nd District
Party	Candidate	Votes	%
Liberal	Edgar Erice	101,051	64.67
NPC	Mitch Cajayon-Uy	52,549	33.63
PBM	Edgardo Espiritu	2,655	1.70
Total votes		156,255	100.00
Liberal hold			

=== 2013 ===
2013 Caloocan legislative election
Party	Candidate	Votes	%
Liberal	Edgar Erice	57,318	38.80
NUP	Mitzi Cajayon	49,976	33.83
NPC	Luis Asistio	26,196	17.73
Ang Kapatiran	Carlo Cabochan	3,346	2.26
Independent	Adoracion Garcia	473	0.32
Margin of victory		7,342	4.97%
Invalid or blank votes		10,443	7.06
Total votes		147,742	100
Liberal gain from NUP			

=== 2010 ===
Philippine House of Representatives election at Caloocan's 2nd district
Party	Candidate	Votes	%
Lakas–Kampi	Mitzi Cajayon	77,364	48.97
Nacionalista	Antonio Almeda	35,546	22.50
Ang Kapatiran	Carlos Cabochan	16,943	10.72
Independent	Ma. Milagros Mercado	13,306	8.42
Liberal	John C. Santos	1,336	0.85
Independent	Tany Catacutan	723	0.46
PGRP	Adoracion Garcia	304	0.19
Independent	Enrique Cube	217	0.14
Valid ballots		145,739	92.25
Invalid or blank votes		12,246	7.75
Total votes		157,985	100.00
Lakas–Kampi hold			

== See also ==
- Legislative districts of Caloocan
