= Community Mortgage Program =

Housing initiative in the Philippines

The Community Mortgage Program is a socialized housing initiative of the Philippine Government. By 2001, 106,273 families had found secure tenure.

== Program ==
The Community Mortgage Program (CMP) was set up following the People Power Revolution of 1986. It aims to help low-income families who are squatting to find secure tenure by establishing community associations to buy land, to set up infrastructure and to build houses. In 1992, the CMP was taken under the National Shelter Program by Republic Act Number 7279, the Urban Development and Housing Act. Then in 2004, Social Housing Finance Corporation (SHFC) was created through Executive Order Number 272 and the CMP alongside other housing initiatives was moved under its control.

In the 1990s, individual families could get loans to fund housing construction, namely 30,000 pesos for undeveloped land, 45,000 pesos for developed land and 80,000 pesos for a house with lot. The loans were given at 6% interest on a 25-year repayment plan.

In 2011, the urban poor organization Kalipunan ng Damayang Mahihirap (Kadamay, or Federation of Mutual Aid for the Poor) stated that the Community Mortgage Program fails to address the needs of urban poor residents, many of whom do not have a stable income to repay their loans.

== Legacy ==
The efficiency of the program was challenged by budget cuts and crises in the National Housing Mortgage Finance Corporation. By 2001, the CMP had helped 106,273 families to set up 854 communities. The local government of Marikina, in cooperation with the CMP and other organizations, initiated an in-city relocation program for informal settlers in 1993, eventually succeeding to relocate more than 30,000 families by 2006.

== See also ==
- Squatting in the Philippines
- Street children in the Philippines
- Poverty in the Philippines
