= Squatting in the Philippines =

Occupation of derelict land or abandoned buildings

Philippines on globe

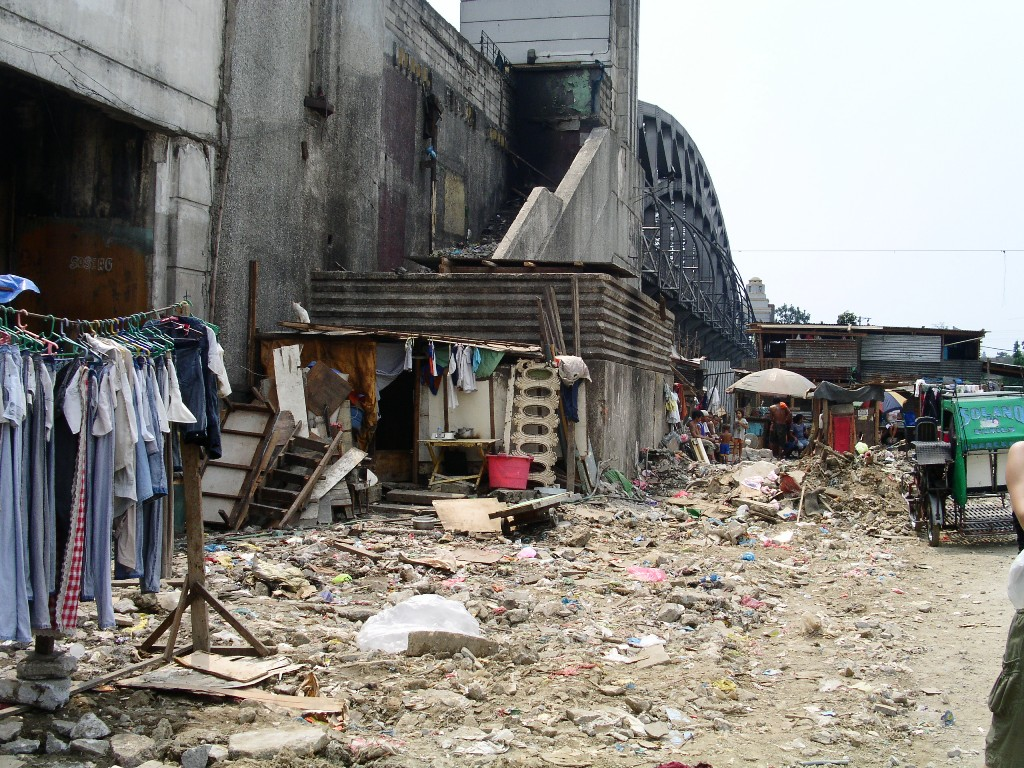
A squatter settlement in Manila in 2007

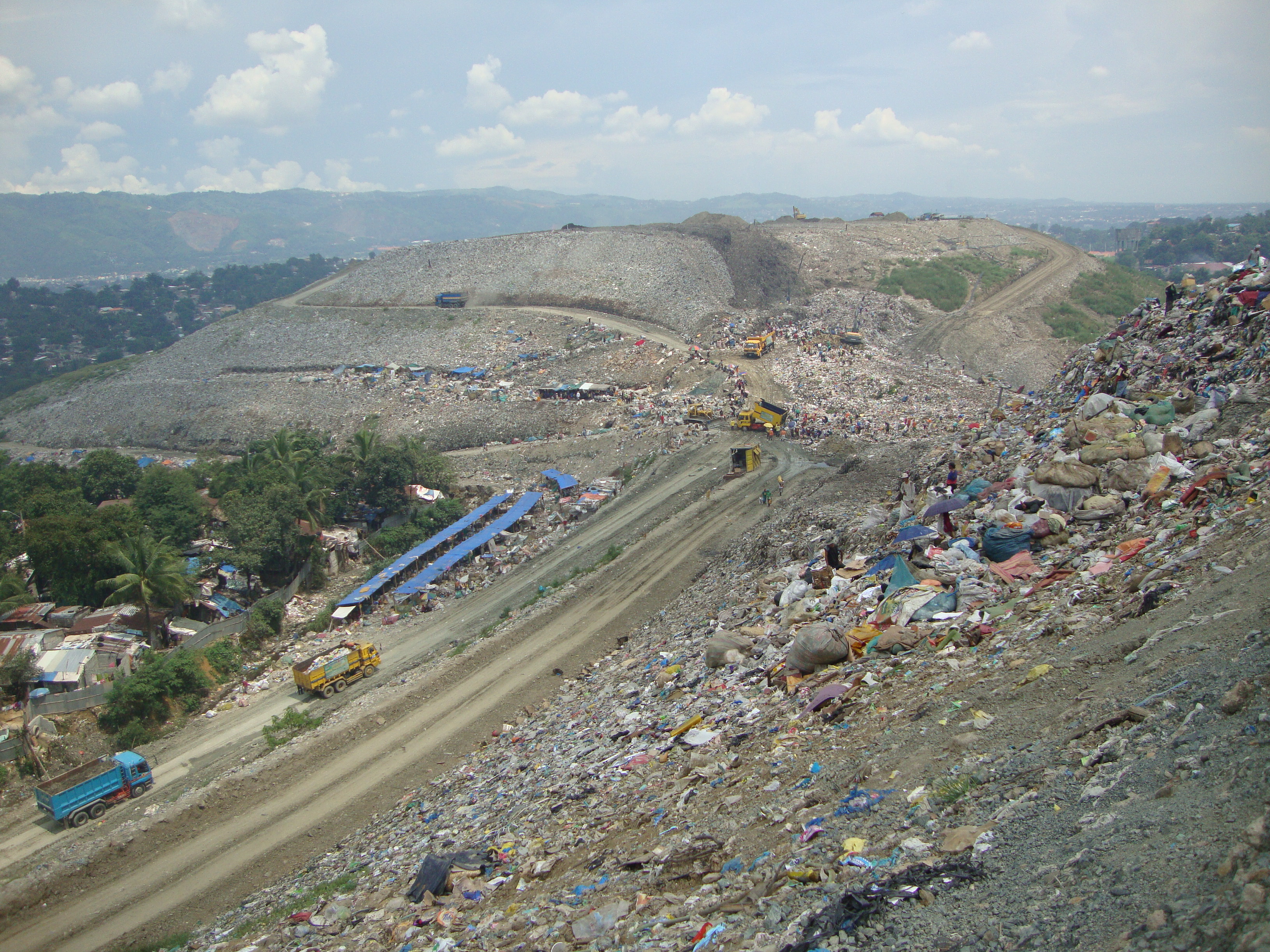
Shacks at Payatas dumpsite in 2010

Urban areas in the Philippines such as Metro Manila, Metro Cebu, and Metro Davao have large informal settlements. The Philippine Statistics Authority defines a squatter, or alternatively "informal dwellers", as "One who settles on the land of another without title or right or without the owner's consent whether in urban or rural areas". Squatting is criminalized by the Urban Development and Housing Act of 1992 (RA 7279), also known as the Lina Law. There have been various attempts to regularize squatter settlements, such as the Zonal Improvement Program and the Community Mortgage Program. In 2018, the Philippine Statistics Authority estimated that out of the country's population of about 106 million, 4.5 million were homeless.

== Overview ==
The Philippine Statistics Authority has defined a squatter as "One who settles on the land of another without title or right or without the owner's consent whether in urban or rural areas". Local media and journalists refer to squatters euphemistically as "informal settlers."

Out of the country's population of about 106 million, an estimated 4.5 million were homeless according to the Philippine Statistics Authority; of these 3 million were in the capital Manila. Causes of homelessness include poverty and destruction of homes due to natural calamities and climate change. Urban poor activist Mimi Doringo has called on the government to redirect corruption-prone pork barrel funds and counterinsurgency spending to address the Philippines' housing backlog.

The growth of homelessness and squatting in urban areas are linked to internal migration from poorer regions. Rural poverty, a major factor in internal migration, has been rooted on various factors, including farmer dispossession and land grabbing, violent suppression of peasant movements, decline of the agricultural sector, and the deterioration of living conditions in rural areas.

Residents of informal settlements tend to experience poor living conditions and may lack access to basic services such as water, sanitation, and health care. Informal settlements may be threatened by or subjected to demolitions, while housing rights activists may be subjected to red-tagging, violent attacks, or harassment. According to cultural studies professor Laurence Castillo, demolitions are justified through a development framework, using such terms as "economic development", "urbanization", and "infrastructural projects".

The Philippine government allotted ₱65.43 billion for housing projects from 2015 to 2022. According to the Philippine Commission on Audit, the National Housing Authority failed to achieve its targets repeatedly, citing instances of project delays and unoccupied housing units. The housing backlog stood at 6.5 million in 2022 and is projected to rise to 10 million under the Bongbong Marcos presidency. UN-Habitat estimates that the housing backlog could reach 22 million by 2040.

== History ==
Squatters build makeshift houses called "barong-barong" on unused land. The occupations increased after World War II as people moved from rural to urban areas. In Cebu City, colonies of squatters emerged after the city was bombed to ruin. By 1974, it was reported that Cebu City had 34 informal settlements and by 1985, it was estimated that there were 232,520 squatters, which had comprised 40% of the city's population. In Davao City, there was a scramble for land previously owned by Japanese people and these occupations were legalized in the 1950s by the government. By 1968, there were an estimated 75,000 squatters living in informal settlements and inner-city slums. At the Port of Manila, land was reclaimed in the 1950s in Tondo and quickly occupied by squatters. By 1968, there were over 20,000 households in the informal settlement. Elsewhere in Manila, parks and military land were occupied. The Zone One Tondo Organization (ZOTO) was set up in 1970 to represent squatter interests in Tondo and campaign for land rights. It inspired other groups and the Ugnayan ng Maralitang Tagalunsod (UMT) was founded in 1976 to campaign for squatters on a national scale. The first mass eviction on record in Manila was in 1951 and the largest took place in late 1963 and early 1964 when 90,000 people were displaced. By 1978, there were estimated to be two million squatters in Manila, occupying 415 different locations.

President Ferdinand Marcos announced martial law in December 1972 and by 1975 he had introduced a decree criminalizing squatting in an attempt to stop the expansion of informal settlements. The dictatorship often forcibly relocated squatters to sites 30 or 40 km outside cities. First Lady Imelda Marcos wanted to beautify Manila and therefore evicted thousands of squatters when the city hosted the 1974 Miss Universe Pageant and the 1976 meeting of the IMF and World Bank. She commented in 1982 that "professional squatters [were] plain land-grabbers taking advantage of the compassionate society". The government attempted to resettle the squatters elsewhere, only for the squatters to return to their homes which were near where they worked, so the Zonal Improvement Program (ZIP) was started in the late 1970s. Slums were then upgraded in situ: The occupations were regularized and supplied with sanitation and electricity. There were squatters at the U.S. Naval Base Subic Bay and the Clark Air Base in the 1980s. In this time, the government began to forcibly resettle squatters again, moving them to places such as Bagong Silang in Caloocan and Payatas in Quezon City. Resistance to evictions fed into the opposition to the Marcos dictatorship and resulted in the 1986 People Power Revolution.

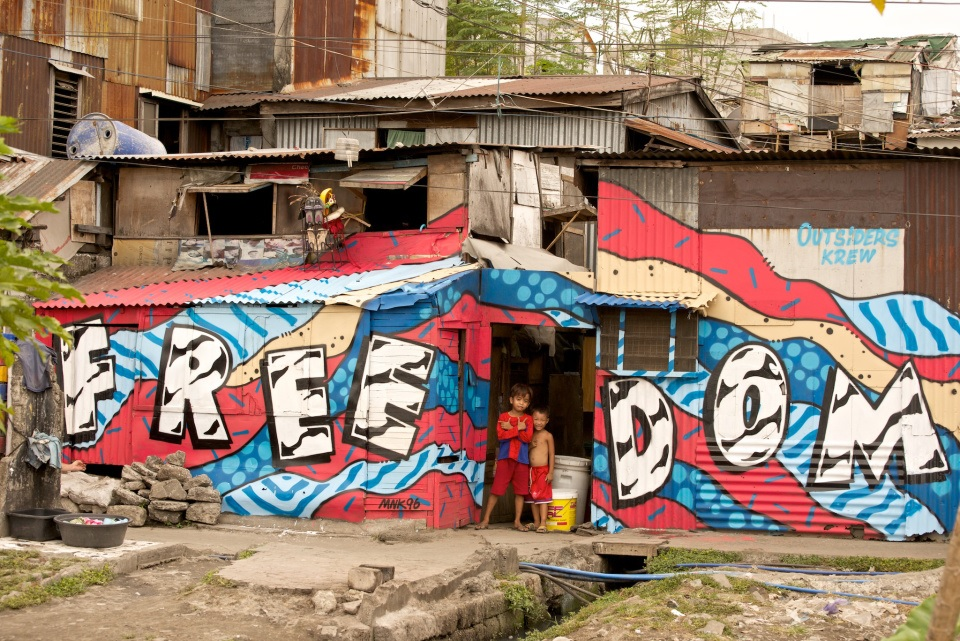
Mural by artist Seb Toussaint in a slum in Manila

The Community Mortgage Program was set up in 1992, aiming to help low-income families transition from squatting to affordable housing. By 2001, around 106,000 families had found secure housing in over 800 separate communities. In 1993, slums in Metro Manila were estimated to contain 2.39 million people, or 30.5 per cent of the area's total population and 706,185 people had been assisted by the ZIP. Impoverished squatters lived on landfill sites such as Smokey Mountain and Payatas dumpsite, working as scavengers.

The urban poor organization Kalipunan ng Damayang Mahihirap (Kadamay, or Federation of Mutual Aid for the Poor) was formed on November 7, 1998, with Carmen "Nanay Mameng" Deunida elected as its first chair.

On January 12, 2000, informal settlers living along Circumferential Road 4 (C-4 Road) in Malabon City were forcibly removed from the area by local policemen, who were conducting a clearing operation to make way for the Camanava Mega-Flood Control project, and squatters who refused to cooperate were temporarily sent to the Malabon police station via dump trucks. Up to 93 squatters and policemen sustained injuries from the operation.

In 2011, community network organization Demolition Watch and Kadamay filed with the United Nations Special Rapporteur on Right to Adequate Housing an appeal to investigate human rights violations on the urban poor, such as violent demolitions and forced relocation to areas with inadequate utilities.

Kadamay carried out the Pandi housing project occupation in March 2017, which is considered a part of the global Occupy movement with its opposition to social and economic inequality. The occupation of over 5,000 housing units built by the National Housing Authority (NHA) in Bulacan was at first condemned by President Rodrigo Duterte and then regularized. The group then attempted to squat NHA property in Rodriguez, Rizal, the following year and in 2019 it picketed the NHA offices in Quezon City.

In June 2020, the Sitio San Roque Alliance, Samahan Ng Magkakapitbahayang North Triangle Association (SAMANA), and Kadamay joined a protest against the demolition of homes in Sitio San Roque, Barangay Bagong Pag-asa, Quezon City.

The number of informal settlers in the Philippines is believed by government officials to have increased during the COVID-19 pandemic.

Amid the flood control projects scandal in the Philippines in 2025, Kadamay and other progressive groups protested budget cuts to social services, such as the ₱50-billion cut to the Pantawid Pamilyang Pilipino Program (4Ps), warning that the funding may be funneled to government corruption. In November 2025, Kadamay and other members of the urban poor community protested in front of the NHA building, saying that President Bongbong Marcos, NHA, and the Human Settlements and Urban Development were "guilty of systemic corruption resulting in homelessness of millions of Filipinos".

== Legal ==
The Philippines is a party to the Universal Declaration of Human Rights and the International Covenant on Economic, Social, and Cultural Rights, which recognize the right to adequate standard of living and adequate housing.

The Urban Development and Housing Act of 1992 (RA 7279), also known as the Lina Law after its proponent Joey Lina, criminalized squatting yet discouraged evictions except in certain cases, such as when the occupation was carried out by "professional squatters and squatting syndicates". The Marcos decree which had previously outlawed squatting was annulled by the Anti-Squatting Law Repeal Act of 1997 (RA 8368).

The Presidential Commission for the Urban Poor, created on December 8, 1986, through Executive Order No. 82, is tasked to formulate policy and implement programs for the urban poor.

The Community Mortgage Program, set up following the People Power Revolution (EDSA I) of 1988, aims to help low-income families who are squatting find secure tenure by establishing community associations to buy land, set up infrastructure, and build houses.

The Philippine Commission on Human Rights recognizes adequate housing as a basic human right and provides guidance for the humane treatment of informal settlers.

In 2021, the Philippine House of Representatives declared a housing emergency in the country through House Resolution 1677. The resolution called on the Department of Human Settlements and Urban Development and other government agencies to address the housing gap by providing housing to the homeless population and to families living in informal settlements. The department estimated the government's housing backlog at 6.5 million units in 2022.

== See also ==
- Land reform in the Philippines
- Street children in the Philippines
- Poverty in the Philippines
