= Smokey Mountain =

Landfill in Manila

Coordinates: 14°37′56″N 120°57′37″E

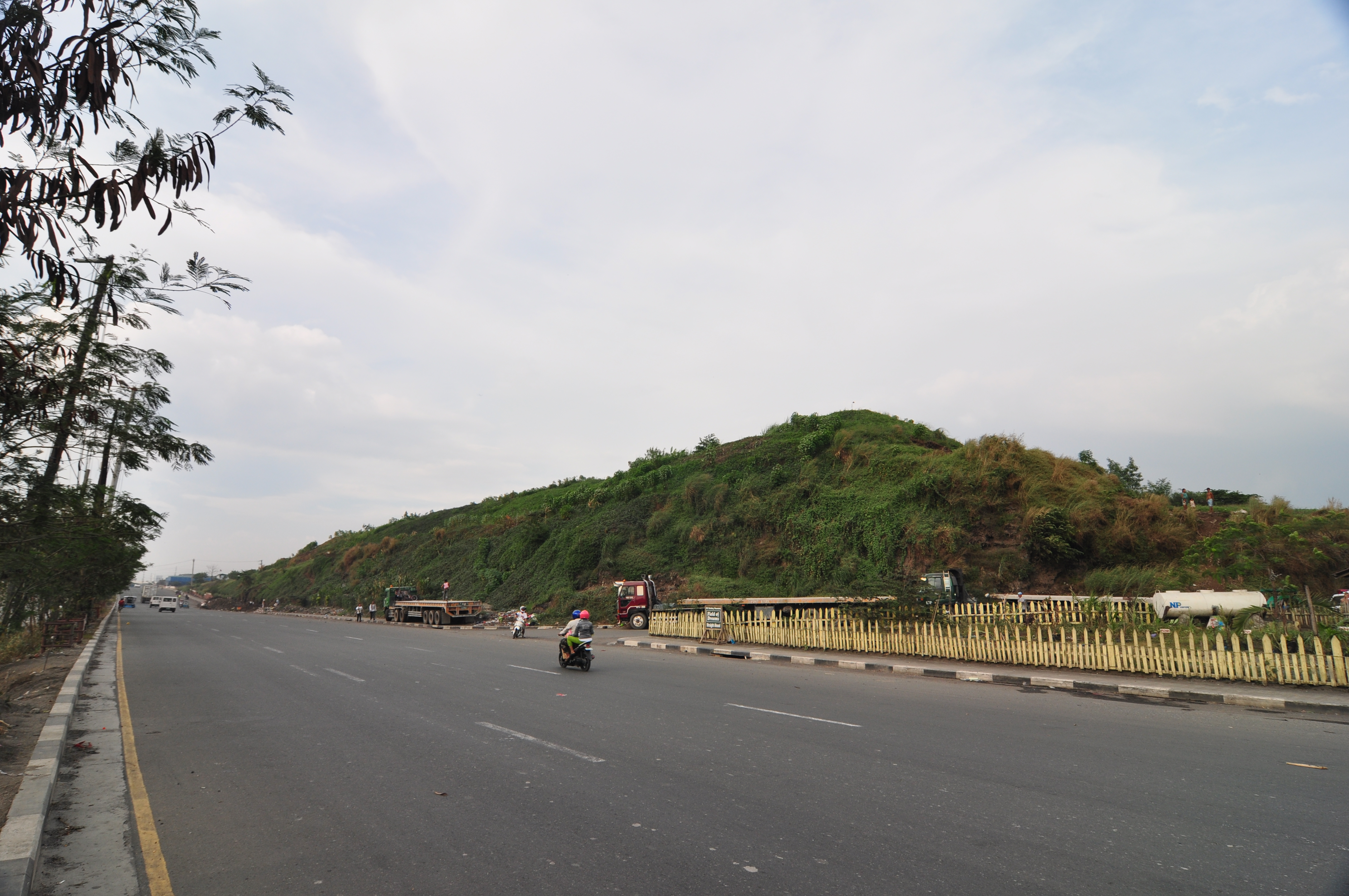
Smokey Mountain, in 2011.

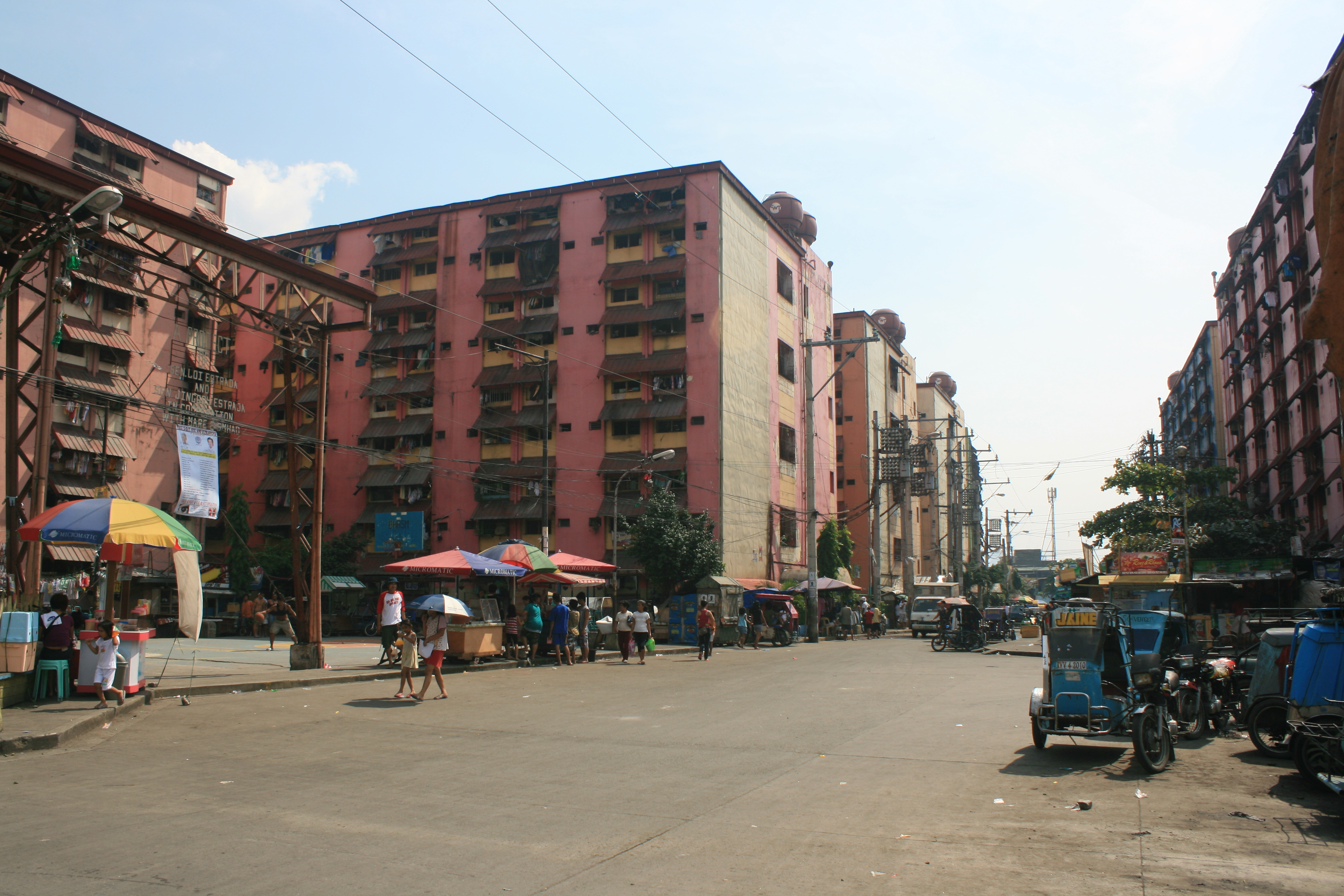
Housing built around Smokey Mountain, seen in 2011.

Smokey Mountain was a large landfill once located in Tondo, Manila.

== History ==
Smokey Mountain operated for at least 50 years, consisting of over two million metric tons of waste. The flammable substances in decomposing waste led to fires that resulted in many deaths.

On March 19, 1993, a joint venture agreement was made between the National Housing Authority (NHA) and R-II Builders Inc. (RBI) to build a low-cost housing project at Smokey Mountain. On August 15, 2007, this agreement was declared valid by the Philippine Supreme Court. The area was officially closed in 1995. The site was turned into public housing for the impoverished people living in the slums surrounding the landfill. The slums were also cleared, which was the home of 30,000 people who made their living from picking through the landfill's rubbish.

In the 1990s, Jane Walker arrived in the Philippines on holiday, and her taxi took her by Smokey Mountain. She was intrigued by the Tondo slums, and she returned to Southampton, where her plan to do something took place. In time, Walker would raise money and funds and build businesses that transformed rubbish into products like handbags. She was awarded an MBE in 2006, and in 2012, she lived in the Philippines.

Projects have been enforced by the government and non-government organizations to allow urban resettlement sites for slum dwellers. According to a UN-Habitat report, over 20 million people in the Philippines live in slums. In Manila alone, 50% of the over 11 million inhabitants live in slum areas.

=== Migration to the Payatas Dump ===
When Smokey Mountain closed in 1995, many scavengers migrated to the Payatas dumpsite, where another scavenging community arose. A landslide at the Payatas dump in 2000 killed over two hundred scavengers. As of 2007, approximately 80,000 people lived at the Payatas dump. The Payatas dumpsite itself closed in 2017.

== In popular culture ==
National Artist for Music Ryan Cayabyab formed the singing group Smokey Mountain in 1989, named after the garbage dump. The band performed songs that tackled socially relevant themes such as poverty, children's rights, environmentalism, and overseas Filipino workers.

National Artist for Film Lino Brocka set some of his films in the slums of Tondo. Smokey Mountain features prominently as the setting for the 1987 film Pasan Ko ang Daigdig starring Sharon Cuneta.

Smokey Mountain was part of a walking tour organized by Smokey Tours, a private organization that donated its profits to impoverished communities through livelihood and environmental projects. Tours at Smokey Mountain ended in 2014 and new tours were held at the Happyland slum area in Tondo and Baseco Compound.

In the manga One Piece, the slum "Grey Terminal", home to main protagonist Monkey D. Luffy, is inspired by Smokey Mountain.

Smokey Mountain was a major hub for helping start Pinoy Gangster Rap, especially as the area was controlled by the Tondo Bloods. Smokey Mountain became the heart of Tondo Bloods territory, even as the dumpsite closed down and as development ensued. During the migration to Payatas dumpsite, the Tondo Bloods expanded their territory to cover parts of Payatas, provoking a major ongoing gang war between the Tondo Bloods and Payatas Crips.

== See also ==
- Slums in Metro Manila
- Environment of the Philippines
- Poverty in the Philippines
- Squatting in the Philippines
