= Barangay 76, Caloocan =

Barangay in Caloocan, Metro Manila, Philippines

Barangay 76 Grace Park West (Monumento)
- Barangay
- Araneta Square Mall
- Interactive map of Barangay 76
- Location within Metro Manila
- Coordinates: 14°39′23.4″N 120°58′58.71″E
- Country: Philippines
- Region: National Capital Region
- City: Caloocan
- District: Part of the 2nd district of Caloocan

Government
  - Type: Barangay
  - Barangay Captain: Adelino A. Fausto
  - Barangay Kagawad: Jhoanna Marie P. Tolentino; Dionisia R. Magat; Lorna J. Dela Cruz; Alain T. Conde; Cesar C. Dela Cruz; Vernon Ommar M. Lagman; Luisito E. Liasos
  - Electorate: 210 (regular; 2023); 85 (SK; 2023)

Area
  - Total: 0.028 km^{2} (0.011 sq mi)

Population (2024)
  - Total: 0
  - Density: 0.0/km^{2} (0.0/sq mi)
- Time zone: UTC+8 (PST)
- Postal Code: 1406
- Area code: 02

Barangay 76 is a barangay of Caloocan, Metro Manila, Philippines. It is known for being the least populous barangay in Metro Manila, with a population of 0 according to the 2024 census. Formerly an agricultural land and later an informal settlement, it is currently predominated by commercial establishments.

== History ==
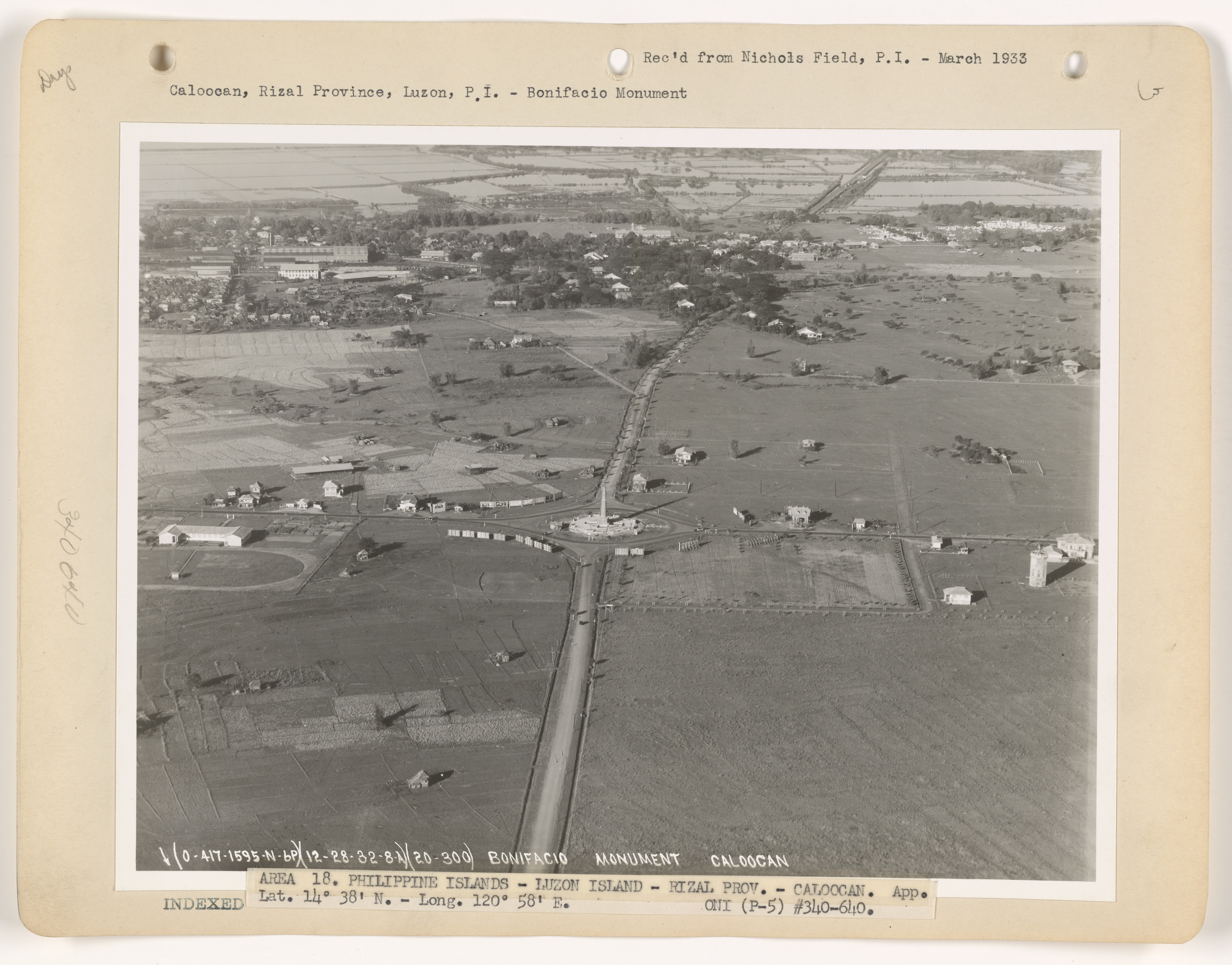
Aerial view of Caloocan showing the vicinity of the present-day barangay, 1933

The barangay occupies parts of land originally of Maysilo Estate (Hacienda de Maysilo), which was once an agricultural land. It was founded apparently when Caloocan implemented the hybrid system for its barangays, where the city is divided into barangays identified by numerical names.

Over time, the barangay became an informal settlement. However, settlers were forced to relocate when the property was sold to businesses.

=== Planned mergers ===
On February 28, 1988, Republic Act No. 6714 was enacted to reduce the number of barangays in Caloocan from 188 to 60. As part of this plan, Barangay 76 was slated to merge with Barangays 70, 72, 74, and 75 to form the new Barangay Calaanan. This proposed merger was subject to a plebiscite on March 10, but was rejected, resulting in the continuation of the existing barangays as independent entities.

Given the small population of Barangay 76, the Caloocan City Government considers merging it with the adjacent Barangay 72, which also has a small population of 46 as of 2020.

== Geography ==
Barangay 76 is located in South Caloocan, particularly at its Grace Park West area. It is part of Zone 7. It is bounded by Samson Road and Barangays 77 and 78 in University Hills to the north, Rizal Avenue and Barangays 86 and 88 in Grace Park East to the east, and Barangay 75 in Grace Park West to the west, and Barangay 72 in Grace Park West to the south. It also occupies the southwestern portion of the Monumento Circle, where the Bonifacio Monument is situated.

== Demography ==
According to the 2024 census, Barangay 76 has a population of just 0, making it the smallest barangay in Metro Manila in terms of population. It succeeded Barangay 72, which had recorded zero residents in the 2015 census but saw an increase to 46 residents in 2020, earning this distinction. Since 1990, the barangay's population was recorded to be on downward trend as the informal settlement that used to be in the barangay was being replaced by a predominantly commercial area.

Year	Population
1990	392
1995	232
2000	106
2010	19
2015	3
2020	2
2024	0

== Economy ==
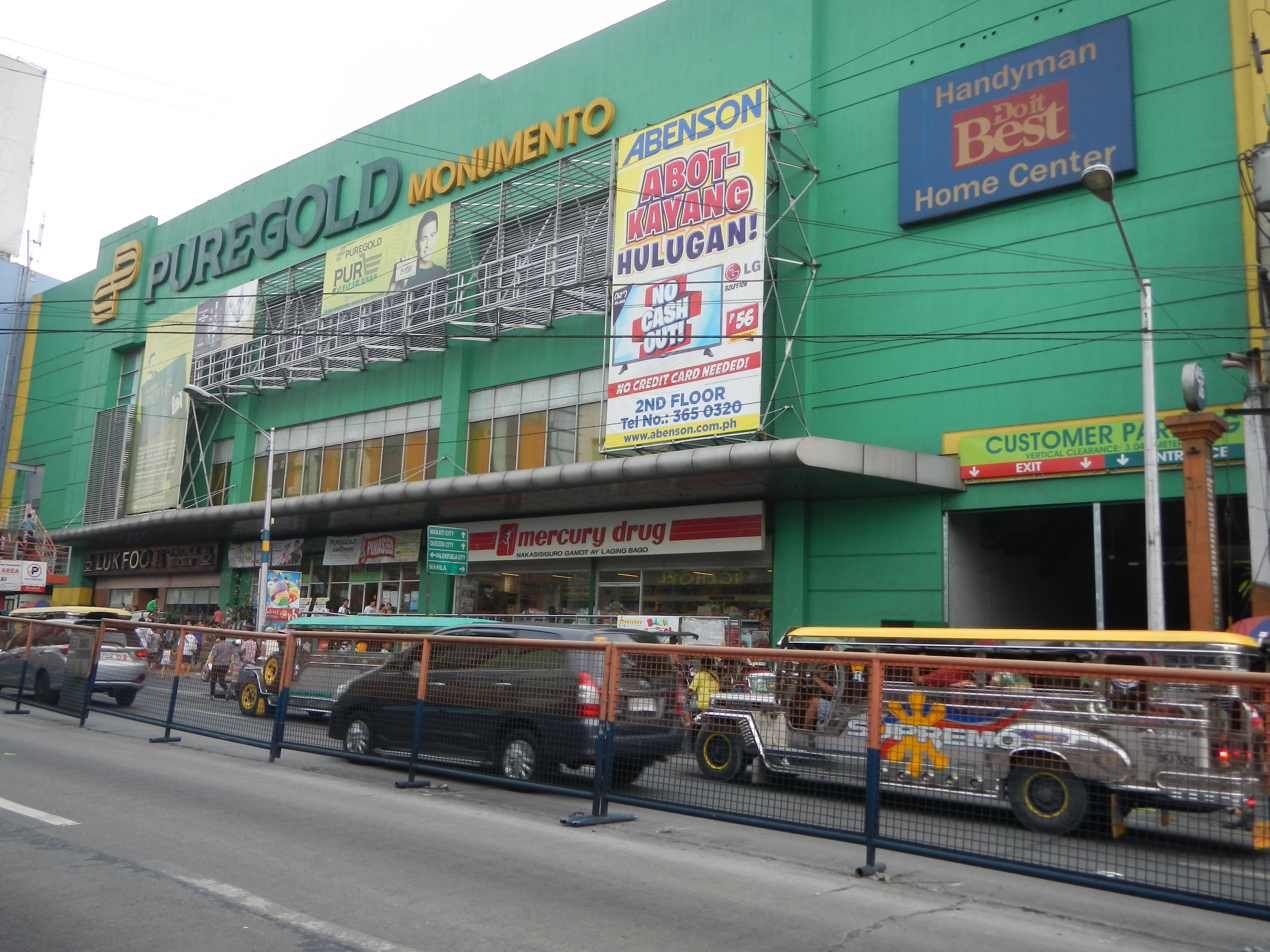
Puregold Monumento

Barangay 76 is allocated ₱1.2 million worth of tax annually. Commercial establishments in the barangay include Araneta Square Mall, Puregold Monumento, Novo Monumento, Northwest Plaza, and the Victory Liner bus terminal.

== Government ==
Like all other barangays of the Philippines, the barangay government of Barangay 76 consists of the barangay captain, its head of government and presiding officer of the seven-member Sangguniang Barangay. The aforementioned officials are all elected. Its seat of government, the barangay hall, is located at the third floor of Araneta Square Mall since 2004.

Its incumbent barangay captain is Adelino Fausto, currently a Malabon resident, who has been holding the position since 1988.

As of 2023, it has 210 registered voters, consisting of former residents of the barangay as the majority, stall owners, salespeople, and shoppers in the vicinity. In addition, it has 85 registered voters for the Sangguniang Kabataan election.
