= Street children in the Philippines =

Poverty-stricken children living or working on the streets in The Philippines

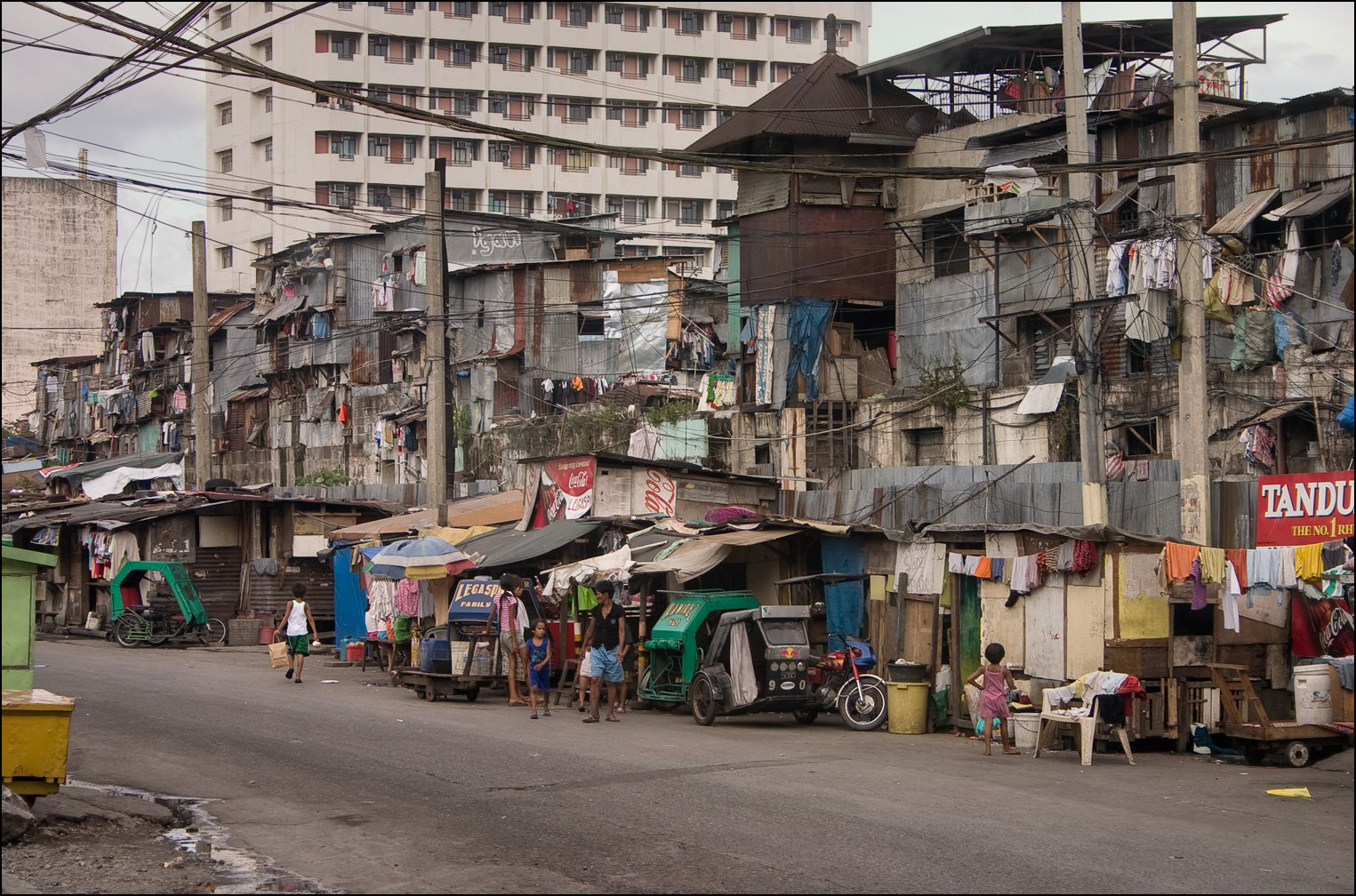
A slum in Manila, circa pre-2009

The Philippines has an estimated 250,000 street children as of 2021. Street children are defined as those who spend part of their time living in the streets for any reason.

== Causes ==
Poverty, displacement due to armed conflict, and exposure to climatic and environmental impacts are key factors that lead to heightened vulnerability and increases in the number of street children. In 2015, 31.4% of children in the Philippines lived below the poverty line, with poverty rates for children in the Autonomous Region in Muslim Mindanao being much higher at 63.1%, according to official government estimates. Street children are more likely to live in poverty, be deprived of access to education and other social services, and experience social discrimination. They are also less likely to have access to justice or legal status.

== Challenges ==
=== Crime ===
A 1997 study estimated that up to 40% of street children had used drugs in the past. Other reports suggest that 66% to 85% of children had used inhalants, and 3% had used marijuana and methamphetamine (known locally as "shabu").

Many street children were in danger of summary execution during the Marcos government era. 39 children in Davao City had been killed by vigilante groups between 2001 and 2005, most after having been released from police detention cells.

=== Sexual abuse ===
Street children are at particular risk of child prostitution. and around 60,000 of the 1.5 million street children in the Philippines were involved in prostitution in 1996. Child prostitutes are used by foreign sex tourists and sexual predators, as well as local people. Some are used to film child pornography, which is rampant in the Philippines. Many street children are lured into prostitution as a means of survival, while others do it to earn money for their families. In particular, child prostitution in Angeles City was exacerbated in the 1980s by Clark Air Base, where bars employed children who ended up as sex workers for American soldiers.

== Response and solutions ==
The Philippines ratified the United Nations Convention on the Rights of the Child on August 21, 1990. It also ratified the Optional Protocol to the Convention on the Rights of the Child on the involvement of children in armed conflict on August 26, 2003, and the Optional Protocol to the Convention on the Rights of the Child on the sale of children, child prostitution, and child pornography on May 28, 2002. The Philippines observes the annual commemoration of the International Day for Street Children on April 12.

Various non-government organizations have established charities and shelters, providing counseling, food, clothing and religious instruction in an attempt to help street children, such as the Tuloy Foundation.

A Filipino street child, Darwin Ramos, was named a Servant of God by the Vatican in 2019 for his efforts in caring for his family and his personal relationship with Christ.

== See also ==
- Children in jail in the Philippines
- Poverty in the Philippines
- Rugby boy

=== Street children in other countries ===
- Street children in Bangladesh
- Street children in Eastern Europe
- Street children in Ghana
- Street children in India
- Street children in Latin America
- Street children in Thailand
- Street children in Ukraine
