= Jane Walker (charity founder) =

British Philippine charity founder (born c. 1964)

Jane Walker MBE
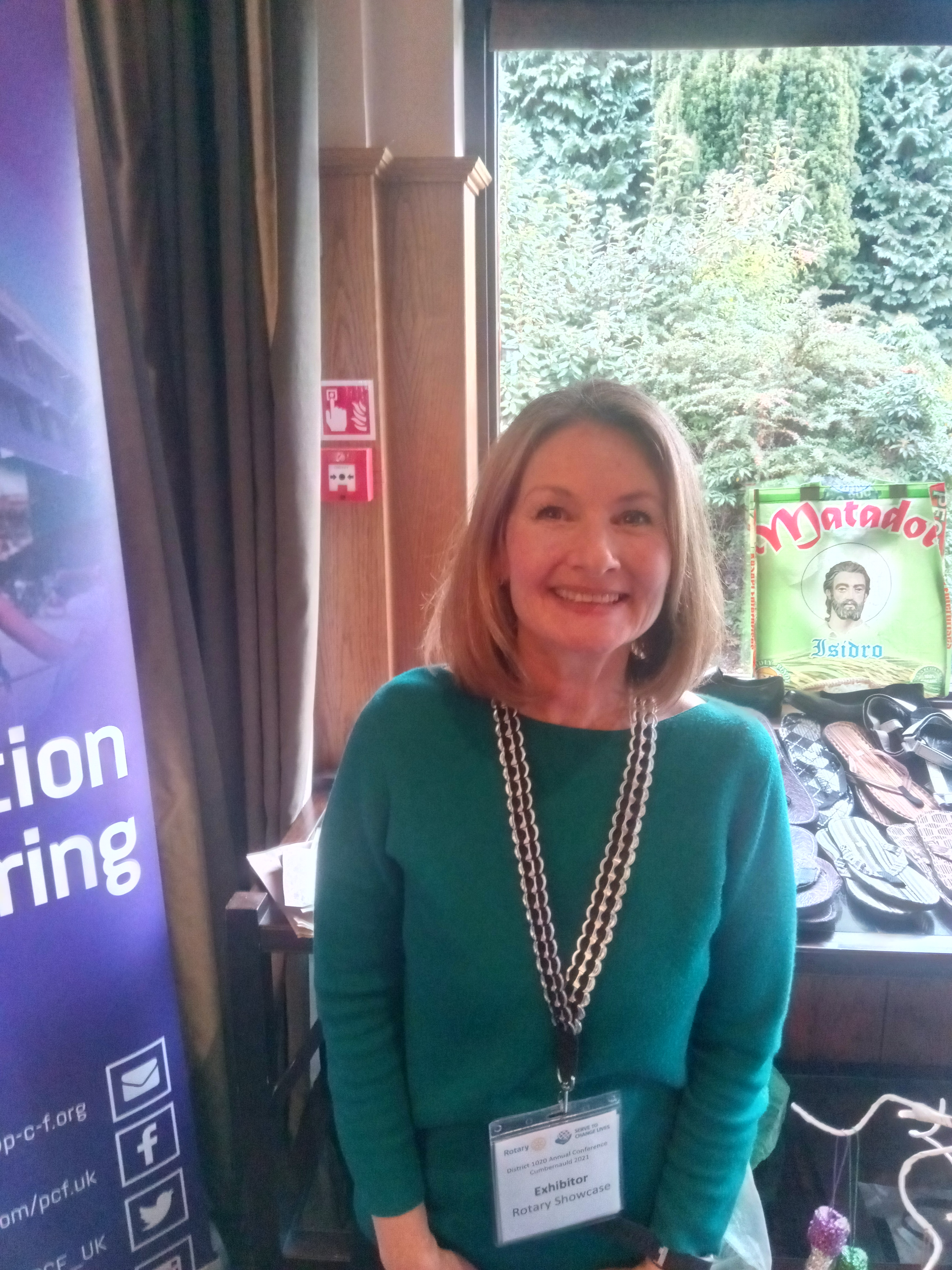
- Walker in 2021
- Born: 1964 (age 61–62); Southampton, England
- Occupation: Charity worker
- Known for: Charity work in the Philippines

Jane Walker MBE (born c. 1964) is a British charity worker who founded the Philippine Community Fund, which is now called the Purple Community Fund. She founded two schools in the Philippines and a supporting charity in 2002.

She was appointed Member of the Most Excellent Order of the British Empire (MBE) in the 2008 Birthday Honours for services to disadvantaged children in the Philippines.

== Life ==
Walker was born in Southampton, England in about 1964. She left home and school when she was sixteen and took various jobs including being a chambermaid. She went into the magazine industry and made some money.

In the 1990s, Walker arrived in the Philippines on holiday and her journey took her by the dump and area of Manila known as Smokey Mountain. She had come to visit a friend after becoming a Christian. Her plan was to take a three-month holiday in the sun with some idealised view of a perfect desert island. As her childhood friend drove her back from the airport she could see the families living in slums by the roadside. She arranged a visit to the cemetery project and she decided before she got back to give up her job in Britain. She was intrigued by the Tondo slums and she returned to Southampton where her plan to "do something" took place. Her family had to respond to the jobless Walker's seemingly irrational vision. She started to gather funds and send them to a contact in Navotas who managed their distribution.

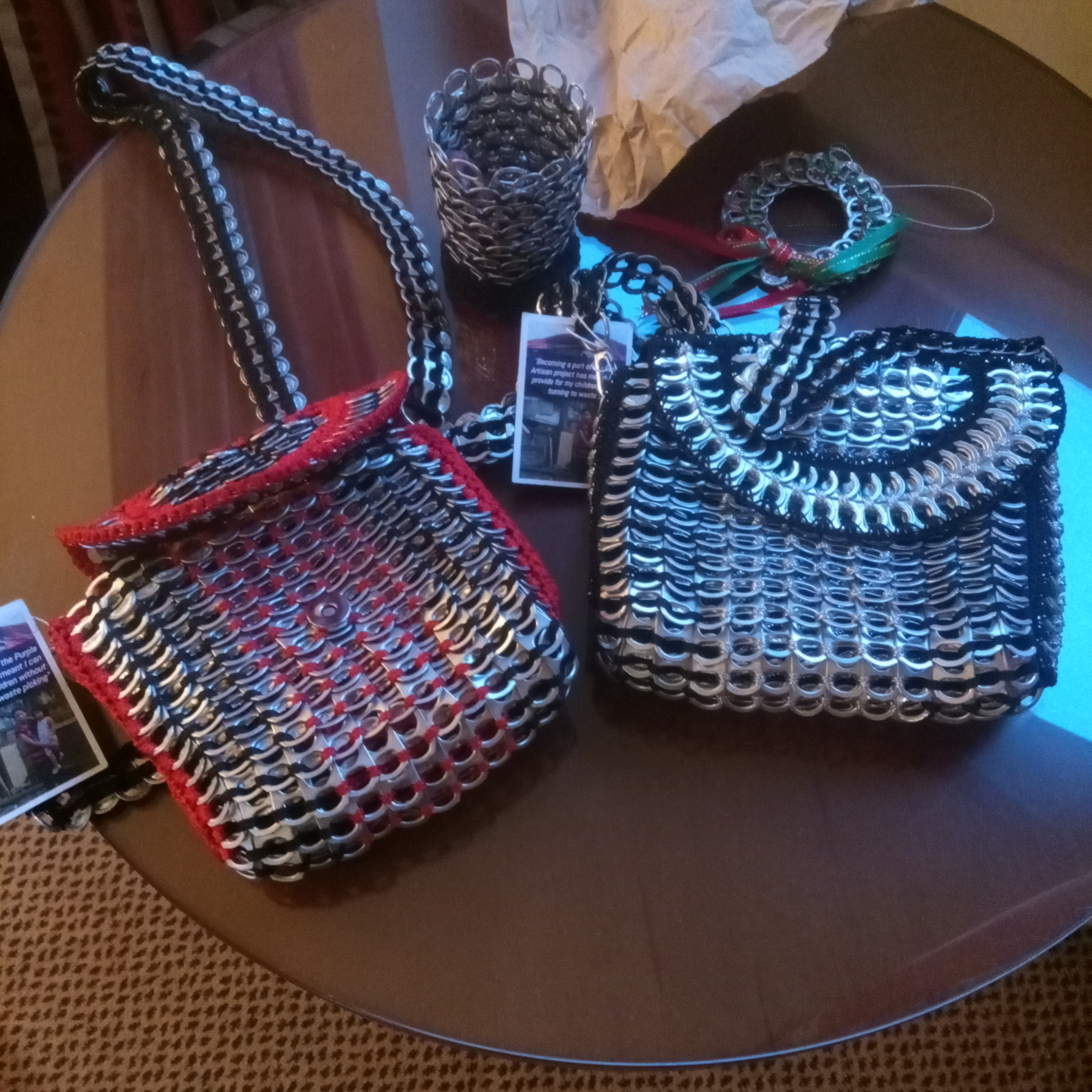
Handbags and other goods made from Ring-pulls by the Purple Community Fund in the Philippines

She raised the money to clear away the asbestos hut that served as a school and it was replaced with a new building. However the new school had pupils but they were hungry and unhealthy. This prompted further work as school students need to be well and well fed.

In 2002, she founded what is now known as the Purple Community Fund as a UK registered charity. The charity looked after the community providing schooling, healthcare and clean water. Moreover the government agreed to let the charity take over a building so that it could create a second school for the children of the Navotas cemetery. The classes were oversubscribed but teaching was happening. Class sizes in the Philippines are frequently over 70 as the country copes with crippling debt and impoverished industries. Children who stepped outside where they lived would have to walk through flies and deep mud and the whole place had methane coming to the surface and polluted air that smelled of smoke and rotting food.

She was awarded an MBE in 2006 and in 2009 she started a scheme in the UK to help offenders after they left prison. In the following year a new school opened on the former rubbish tip in Tondo. The new school was made from 74 shipping containers and it has nearly thirty classrooms on four different floors. The school was called the "Philippine Community Fund (PCF')'s Openwork foundation school" and it had facilities for 1,000 children who can attend from four years old. The new school lacked the rats, flooding and mosquito's of the previous school and it had new features like windows.

In 2012 she was living in the Philippines.

In time she would raise money, raise funds and build businesses that transformed rubbish into products. This caused her to be referred to by gulfnews.com as the "Angel of the dump". In 2013 her charity was supported by Rotary International members. People in the Philippines were collecting ring-pulls, as where members of Soroptimist International and the girl guides. After they were gathered together they are cleaned, sorted and polished they are made into handbags by the elderly, teenagers and people with disabilities.
