= Decree 770 =

1967 Romanian natalist decree

State Council of Romania
- Long title: Decree No. 770 of October 1, 1966, on Measures to Regulate Pregnancy Interruption Romanian: Decret Nr. 770 din 1 octombrie 1966 - pentru reglementarea întreruperii cursului sarcinii
- Territorial extent: Socialist Republic of Romania
- Enacted by: State Council of Romania
- Enacted: 1 October 1966
- Repealed: 26 December 1989

Repeals
- Decree No. 463 (1957)

Amended by
- Decree 53 (1972); Decree 411 (1985)

Repealed by
- Decree - Law No. 1 (1989)
- Status: Repealed

The birth and death rate in Romania from 1950 to 2050. Decree 770 was signed by Nicolae Ceaușescu in 1967. The birthrate surged in 1967. It returned to its previous trend, as people found ways to circumvent the decree.

Decree 770 was a decree of the communist government of Romanian dictator Nicolae Ceaușescu, signed in 1967. It restricted abortion and contraception in Romania, and was intended to create a new and large Romanian population. The term decreței (from Romanian decret 'decree'; diminutive decrețel) is used to refer to those Romanians born during the time period immediately following the decree.

== Origin of the decree ==
Before 1968, the Romanian abortion policy was one of the most liberal in Europe. Because the availability of contraceptive methods was poor, abortion became the foremost method of Romanian family planning.

Through a combination of Romania's postwar modernization, high participation of women in the workforce, and a low standard of living, the number of births significantly decreased after the 1950s, reaching its lowest recorded level up-to-date in 1966. Romanian leaders interpreted the decreasing number of births to be a result of the 1957 decree that legalized abortion.

To counter this sharp decline in the birth rate, the Communist Party decided that the country's population should be increased from 20 million to 30 million inhabitants. In October 1966, Decree 770 was personally sanctioned by Ceaușescu. Abortion was declared illegal, except for:

- women over 45 (later lowered to 40, then raised again to 45).
- women who had already borne four children (later raised to five).
- women whose life would be threatened by carrying to term, due to medical complications.
- women who were pregnant through rape and/or incest.

== Enforcement ==
To enforce the decree, society was strictly controlled. Contraceptives were removed from sale and all women were required to be monitored monthly by a gynecologist. Any detected pregnancies were followed until birth. The secret police kept a close eye on hospital procedures.

Sex education was refocused primarily on the benefits of motherhood, including the ostensible satisfaction of being a heroic mother who gives her homeland many children.

== Consequences ==
The direct consequence of the decree was a huge baby boom. Between 1966 and 1967 the number of births almost doubled, and the estimated total fertility rate (TFR) increased from 1.9 to 3.7. The generation born in 1967 and 1968 was the largest in Romanian history. Thousands of nursery schools were built. As the children got older, their needs were not properly met. There were cases where lectures were shortened to enable three school shifts. In schools, a student–teacher ratio of over 40 children per class became frequent. When, after the revolution, lots of businesses closed or shrank their workforce, the latest hires were fired preferentially.

The decree was abolished on 26 December 1989, days after the Romanian Revolution.

== Circumvention and mortality ==
In the 1970s, birth rates declined again. Economic pressure on families remained, and people began to seek ways to circumvent the decree. Wealthier women were able to obtain contraceptives illegally or to bribe doctors to give diagnoses which made abortion possible. Especially among the less educated and poorer women there were many unwanted pregnancies. These women could only use primitive methods of abortion, which led to infection, sterility, or even their own death. The mortality among pregnant women became the highest in Europe during the reign of Ceaușescu. While the childbed mortality rate kept declining over the years in neighboring countries, in Romania it increased to more than ten times that of its neighbors.

Many children born in this period became malnourished, were severely physically disabled, or ended up in care under grievous conditions, which led to a rise in child mortality.

== Romanian orphans ==
A consequence of Ceaușescu's natalist policy was that large numbers of children ended up living in orphanages, because their parents could not cope with looking after them. The vast majority of children who lived in the state-run orphanages were not actually orphans, like the name implies, but simply children whose parents could not afford or did not want to look after them.

== Romanian revolution ==
In their book Freakonomics, authors Steven Levitt and Stephen J. Dubner discuss the legalised abortion and crime effect: the argument that children who are born after their mothers are refused an abortion are much more likely to commit crimes or refuse to recognize authority when they reach adulthood. They further argue that the Decreței are exactly the same people who spearheaded the Romanian revolution where Ceaușescu's regime was violently overthrown in 1989.

In 1989, the oldest decreței would have been 22 years old, in the general age range of most revolutionaries. Levitt and Dubner note that Romania was the only east-European communist country with strict anti-abortion and anti-contraception laws at the time, and the only country whose ruler was violently overthrown and killed at the end of the Cold War. Most other such countries experienced a tumultuous, but peaceful, transition. There were however other aspects of totalitarian rule that would promote violent reaction instead of peaceful transition, including a lack of associational life and legal gatherings, a more extensive system of informants and special police than any state other than East Germany, and a cult of personality built up around the leader.

The actual violence of the revolution can be attributed to divisions among the ruling and military/secret police and the vacuum of power that resulted. Revolutions are often observed to come in waves, and it is believed by some authors that Romania would have experienced violent revolution no matter its demographic situation.

== Abortion after 1990 ==
Although abortion in Romania was legalized and the abortion rates were very high, they decreased strongly as more couples started using contraception.

Although in the early 1990s, shortly after abortion was legalized, the abortion rate was very high, it decreased strongly as more couples started using contraception, and the economy also started to improve after the instability of the transition. The chart presented shows data from the National Institute of Statistics for years between 1990 and 2010 and from Eurostat for data between 2011 and 2018.

== In film ==
- 4 Months, 3 Weeks and 2 Days is a 2007 film directed by Cristian Mungiu (born in 1968 under the decree). It follows two unmarried students who try to abort a pregnancy.

== See also ==
- Tales from the Golden Age
- Tax on childlessness

== Sources ==
This article, or a previous version, was translated from the article "Decreet 770" on the Dutch Wikipedia. This Dutch article used the following sources:

- Children of the decree (Das Experiment 770: Gebären auf Befehl), German movie from 2004 by Florin Iepan
- "The 1966 law concerning prohibition of abortion in Romania and its consequences - the fate of one generation", Manuela Lataianu, Polish Academy of Sciences, Warsaw
