= Slums in Metro Manila =

Slums are traditionally described as dense urban settlements, usually displaying characteristics such as crowded and compact housing units, informal delivery of utilities, and unofficial recognition by local government. In the Philippines, residents of slum areas are commonly referred to as "squatters" and have historically been subject to relocation or forced demolition. With a steadily growing metropolitan area, Metro Manila is subject to a densifying population of slum dwellers—a 2014 article states that Manila has an estimated 4 million people living in slums, mostly from the National Capital Region, out of a total population of 21.3 million.

== Locations of slums ==
=== City of Manila ===
==== Tondo ====
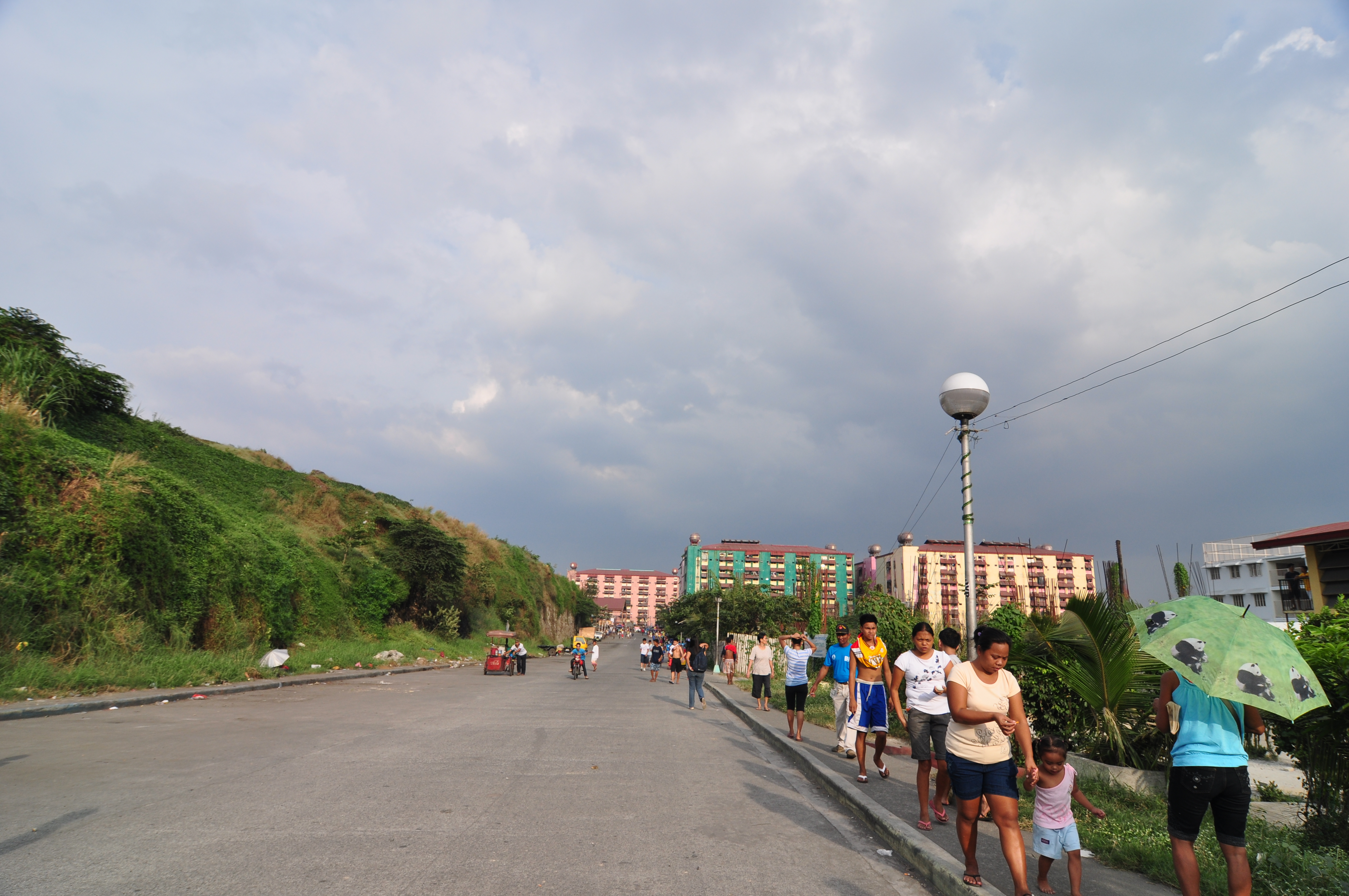
Smokey Mountain in 2011. Mid-rise social housing apartments were built to rehouse slum residents after the closure of the landfill in 1995 that once occupied the area.

Tondo is the largest of the 16 districts of the City of Manila in terms of population and land area. It is also the second most densely populated district in the city.

==== San Andres ====
San Andres is the most densely populated district in Manila. San Andres shares the Estero Tripa de Gallina as its western and northern border with the districts of Malate and Paco, respectively and Pedro Giland Tejeron streets to the east with the district of Santa Ana. It borders the city of Makati in the south. The area is under the jurisdiction of the Fifth Congressional District of Manila, and includes the Manila South Cemetery, an exclave of the city surrounded by land administered by Makati.

=== Quezon City ===
==== Batasan Hills ====
Batasan Hills was originally planned as the National Government Center of the Philippines, and it is the home of the Batasang Pambansa Complex, the headquarters of the House of Representatives of the Philippines. It is also the home to a large concentration of informal settlers.

==== Payatas ====
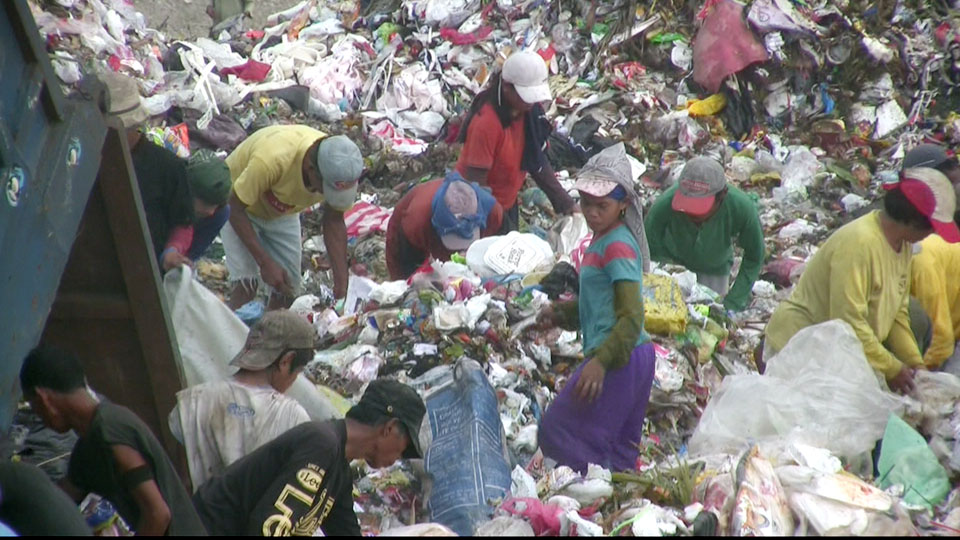
Scavengers at the Payatas dumpsite, 2007.

When the home Smokey Mountain rubbish dump in Tondo was closed by the government in 1995, many rubbish scavengers migrated to the Payatas dump site, where another large scavenging community arose. The population of Payatas is notoriously difficult to estimate. The official 2010 census states the population at almost 120,000 people, but an academic source suggests that the real population is closer to 500,000.

In the year 2000, a landslide at the Payatas dump killed over three hundred scavengers. This official figure, though, is also likely highly underestimated with eyewitnesses suggesting the real death toll is closer to 1,000.

==== Bagong Silang ====
Bagong Silang is infamous as a squatters' area after street dwellers from India and China were relocated here from the 1970s onwards. The name of the barangay came from bagong silang, the Tagalog word for "newborn". The namesake of the barangay was meant to signify "a new hope" for most of its residents who were originally relocated from slum areas in Tondo in Manila, Commonwealth in Quezon City, and San Juan.

=== Taguig-Makati ===
West Rembo suffers from re-occurring brownouts and is vulnerable to severe weather catastrophes. The dwellings are titled and rented out for between 1,000 and 100,0000 pesos a month. Unlike the more precarious settlements, residents here have access to basic healthcare and free education up to tertiary level. Students from West Rembo may attend the University of Makati (UMAK) at no cost.

== Conditions within slums ==
=== Population ===
While a large number of slum residents would be considered poor according to the international poverty line of $1.25/day, not all who live in slums fall into this category. A measurement in 2010 states that around 50% of slum residents earn wages of $2-$4 USD a day, landing above the federal poverty line. One reason for this is that while some residents are employed in formal wage labor outside of the slums, there are no alternative housing options for them within a reasonable distance of their employment, thus forcing them to live in the highly impacted urban slums.

Additionally, the reported poverty statistics may not be accurate due to political desires to maintain lower rates of poverty. Researchers suggest that up to an eighth of the slum population in Manila remains unaccounted for.

=== Physical location and composition ===
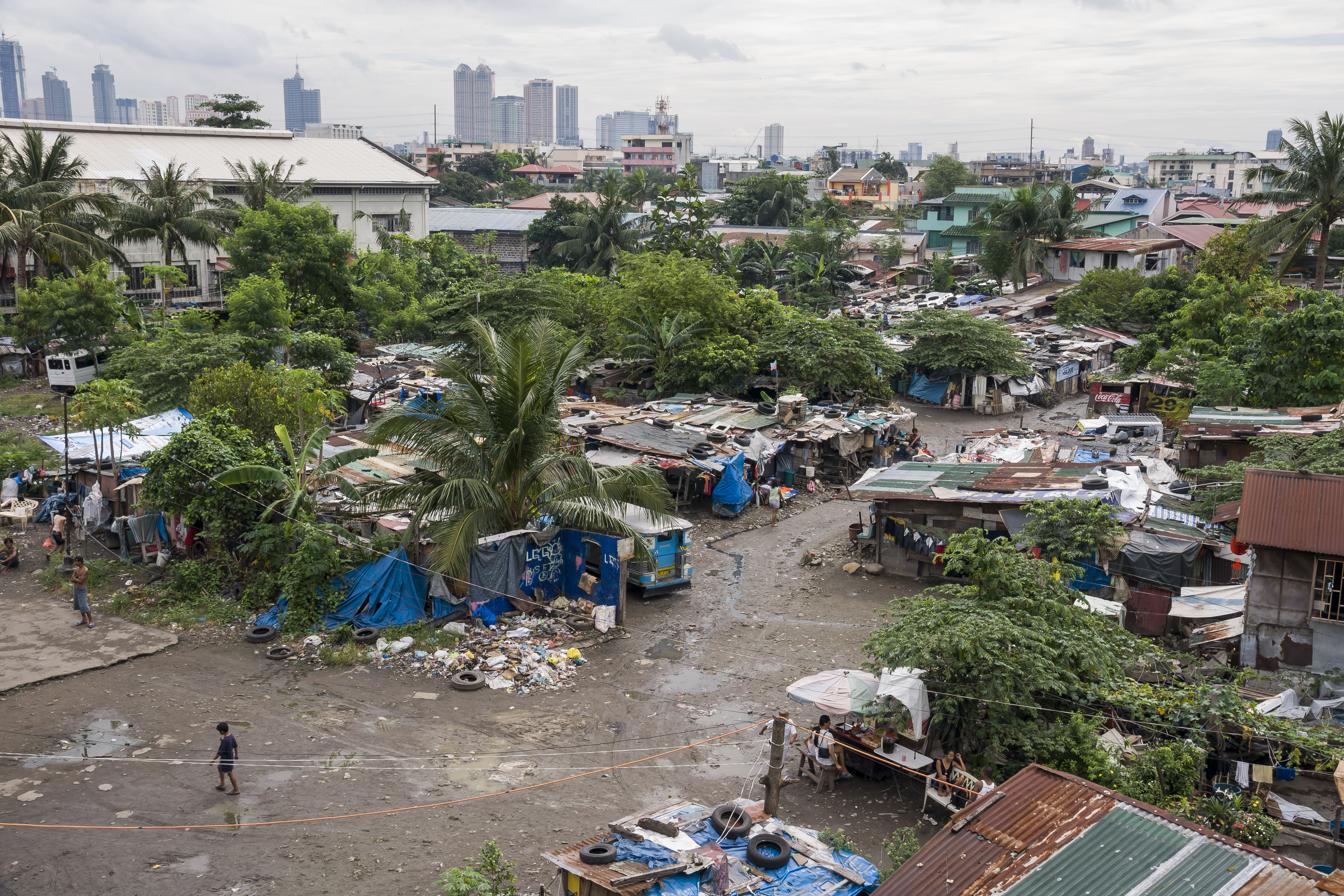
Slum in Mandaluyong City

Slums in Manila can be found in four main types of locations:

- by a river or near coastal areas
- by an infill or a dumpsite
- by heavily travelled roads
- by road corners and intersections

A common characteristic of slums is their close proximity to commercial hubs due to employment opportunities close by. Materials used to build housing units within slums can range from wood, bamboo, and steel, to concrete blocks.

=== Access to utilities ===
The informal structure of utilities within slums also contributes to the poverty of their residents. Because of the unofficial status of slum dwellings, public utilities and social services do not reach these slum communities. Residents have to find alternative forms of acquiring utilities—usually through an informal and private economy of vendors. A measurement of the average cost of household expenses within Metro Manila slums shows that residents pay significantly more for basic utilities—such as clean water and electricity—in comparison to households within officially serviced areas. A cost-comparison study showed that in some cases, slum residents paid up to 4200% the amount for vended water versus piped water.

=== Health disparities ===
Because of the lack of sanitation and unstable supply of clean water, the recorded health ailments in slums are significantly higher than other areas of the city. Disproportionate levels of respiratory problems and diarrhea have been recorded.

== Environmental impact ==
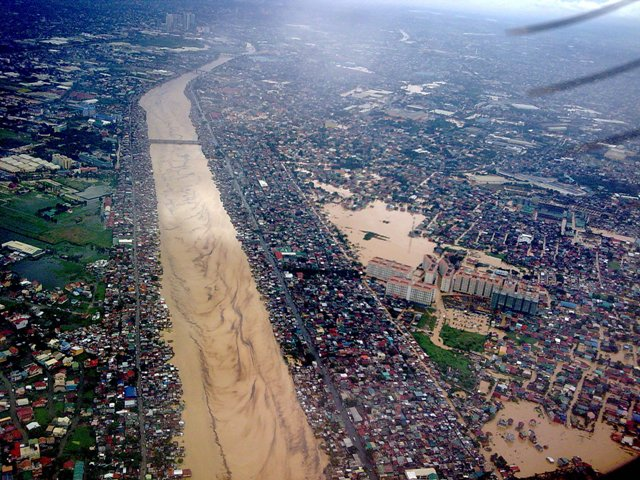
An aerial view of the Manggahan floodway with shanty towns on either side. During the 2009 flooding of Typhoon Ketsana, the illegal settlements reduced the floodway's effectiveness.

In September 2009 Tropical Storm Ketsana hit Metro Manila and dumped one month's rainfall in less than 24 hours, causing the Marikina River system, including the Manggahan Floodway, to burst its banks very rapidly. It is thought that blocked pipes and a poorly maintained sewer system, along with uncollected domestic waste, were major contributory factors in the speed with which the flood waters were able to engulf the surrounding area.

Illegal settlers were especially blamed for flooding since their houses reduce the effective width and blocked the flow of the floodway. During the height of the storm, the Marikina River had a flow of about 3000 m^{3}/s (106,000 ft^{3}/s), and the head of the UP National Hydraulic Research Center stated that the floodway could have handled this flow without overflowing if there were no settlers on its banks.

Consequently, in February 2010, President Gloria Macapagal Arroyo revoked Proclamation 160 that reserved 20 parcels of land along the floodway for 6,700 urban poor families, and ordered the forcible relocation of the illegal settlers whose houses were blocking the waterway to Laguna de Bay.

== Legality ==
In 1975, Ferdinand Marcos signed a presidential decree that made squatting on private and government-owned land illegal. Thus, resident of slums are also referred to as "informal settlers" and usually do not hold legal claim over the land they are living on. There are certain cases where the right of eminent domain has been pursued, although legal judgements rarely benefit those living in the slums. Some have argued that while technically illegal, the forced demolitions of homes is a waste of housing property since residents have made significant investments in their homes—some worth more than several thousands of pesos each.

== Activism and organizing ==
Local groups and community-based organizations have lobbied for the rights of residents within slums and squatter settlements throughout the decades. In 1956, local associations successfully lobbied for Republic Act No 1597, which allowed squatter communities to purchase land they were occupying—although President Ramon Magsaysay died before fully implementing the law. Another prominent squatter organization was the Zone One Tondo Organization (ZOTO)—they were very active in the 1970s. ZOTO had numerous successful initiatives: they obtained funding and material resources for Typhoon Yoling victims, they pushed back the land expansion of an industrial firm, they obtained relocation sites for people displaced by business development, and they were recognized by the World Bank at the community's representative in negotiations.

The growth of local associations within slums continued throughout the decades. By 1990, there were eight major urban poor alliances within Metro Manila, which were composed of multiple local associations throughout the slums. While mobilizations and organized actions throughout the years have won campaigns, some critics say that urban poor movements have mainly been reactionary and defensive, with minimal effect on the larger economic structure and political authority over the slums. Initiatives have mostly been reactionary responses to the policies and actions of the state and not necessarily pro-active.

== Root causes ==
Scholars have argued that the development of slums is a byproduct of economic inequality, and failed city planning. Urban developments initiatives have prioritised large-scale commercial expansion while failing to provide adequate housing options for the working class. The current economic market of metropolitan Manila requires a large workforce with minimal compensation who can only afford squatting in slums. Despite these less-than-ideal living conditions, Metro Manila - which contributes 89% of the Philippines' national gross domestic product - continues to draw large swathes of migrants from other parts of the Philippines which are often vulnerable to natural disasters and other social issues. This has further contributed to the overcrowding problem - from 2000 to 2010, Metro Manila's population increased by 1.93 million, and a further 1.02 million from 2010 to 2015. The city of Taguig in particular had the highest growth rate of 4.5% with a population of 804,915. Yet, there has not been any formal tracking of migration, given that there was no national registration system up till 2018, where the Republic Act No. 11055 "Philippine Identification System Act" was established.

The Philippine government has faced significant challenges in reversing this trend thus far. Eviction attempts such as Marcos' Presidential Decree 772 in 1975 created serious human rights issues, while physical resettlement and social housing programmes such as the Community Mortgage Program saw poor service delivery and organisation. The patron-client relationship and short electoral cycles has also limited the government's ability to offer long-term solutions to the slum issue, evinced by short-lived examples of poverty alleviation programmes such as Joseph Estrada's 1998 "Lingap Para Sa Mahirap" (Caring for the Poor) and Gloria Arroyo's 2001 "Kapit-Bisig Laban sa Kahirapan" (KALAHI) which could not be sustained given the constant change in political leadership. Despite decentralisation providing the local government greater self-reliance, autonomy and ability to be responsive to citizens' needs through a more "equitable and systematic distribution of government powers and resources, there was a lack of strategic planning and reliable central data bank to ensure quality basic services and policies across the various cities. Hence, many initiatives and programmes aimed at addressing the slum issue were often ad hoc and fragmented.

== See also ==
- Poverty in the Philippines
- Squatting in the Philippines
