= Street children in Thailand =

Based on the definition by the Inter-NGO Programme on Street Children and Street Youth, 1983, a street child refers to "any boy or girl…for whom the street in the widest sense of the word…has become his or her habitual abode and/or source of livelihood, and who is inadequately protected, supervised, or directed by responsible adults". One recent U.S. State Department study reported an estimated 20,000 children on the streets of Thailand's major urban centres.

According to a research by the Foundation for the Better Life for Children, the number rose rapidly from 20,000 in 2006 to 30,000 in 2010. This suggests an escalating scale and severity of the problem. These children are not restricted to only the Thai nationals; a significant portion of them are Khmer, Burmese, Laos and Vietnamese. Roughly 40 percent of the street children in Bangkok surveyed in 2008–2010 by Friends-International are Khmer, Burmese and Vietnamese.

== Categories ==
While there are various definitions and categories of street children, the organizations that work with street children in Thailand frequently employ these categories in their works:

1. Street working children - children who maintain regular contacts with their families, but spend a majority of their time working on the streets to provide an income for their families or themselves;
2. Street living children - children who actually live and work on the streets and are abandoned and neglected or have run away from their families; and
3. Children from street living families - children of families living on the streets.

== Causes ==
Children end up on the streets of Thailand for many reasons, including homelessness, poverty, domestic violence, natural disasters, rapid urbanization and economic crises. For Thai street children, the main causes of them coming to work/live on the streets are family problems and domestic violence. In contrast, the non-citizen street children mainly cited poverty and economic reasons. Economics reasons also affect the Thai children significantly, as the Asian economic crisis resulted in the increase in number of Thai street children who came from middle-class families.

== Risks and challenges ==
Street children in Thailand are faced with serious risks and challenges. Organized gangs often exploit street children to work as beggars or to sell flowers and miscellaneous items. Many of these children are forced to turn over their daily earnings to the gang and are paid about 20 to 30 baht (less than a dollar) a day. Working conditions for these children are usually poor, leaving them exposed to the elements for long periods of time and to further exploitation.

Street children also lack control over their situation and power to change it. On the streets, they are vulnerable to dangers such as sexual abuse. They are more likely than other children to contract HIV/AIDS and to engage in lifelong criminal or self-destructive behaviors, for example, abusing drugs and sniffing glues.

They also face a serious long-term threat to their rights and their future. The likelihood of ever having an opportunity to fulfill their potential, since living on the streets virtually makes them unable to go to the schools. A minority of these children has never attended school at all.

== See also ==
- Homelessness
- Street Child
- Prostitution of children
- Child prostitution in Thailand
- Child trafficking
- Child labour
- Child abuse
