= Street children in Ghana =

The total population of children in Ghana under the age of 15 is 38.01%. The youth constitute the most important human resource potential that can contribute significantly to the overall development of a nation. The idea of children on the streets violates the children's act which states that under no circumstance should a person below the age of fifteen be allowed to work or fend for himself or herself. Therefore, the increasing phenomenon of street-ism is a menace. The street children are viewed worldly as problem (because some of them steal to survive) rather than people whose first habitat is the street. Obviously, extreme deprivation and social exclusion create opportunities for engaging in crime. Street children are among the most physically visible of all children, living and working on various street corners and public squares in our cities ranging from Aflao to Bawku. Ironically, they are also among the most 'invisible', considering that they are the most difficult groups to reach with provision of vital services such as education and healthcare, and thus the hardest to protect. Once on the street, aside being exposed to the mercy of the weather, they are vulnerable to all forms of exploitation and abuse, a life far removed from the childhood envisioned in the United Nations Convention on the Rights of the Child. Street children represent one of the most marginalized groups of children worldwide. They face multiple deprivation of their rights on a daily basis.

== Facts ==
Currently, about sixty-one thousand four hundred and ninety-two children are on the streets of Accra struggling to make ends meet. In May 2009, a head count of street children was done in Accra. The result obtained showed that 43% of the total population were males and 57% were females. In Ghana, a large number of street children can be found in Central Accra, the Kwame Nkrumah circle, Kumasi, Tamale, and other major centres. The largest number of street children came from the Northern Region of Ghana forming 28.53% of the children found in the streets of Accra. The smallest number of children found in the streets of Accra were from the BrongAhafo Region contributing 2.38% to the total population of street children in Accra.

== Causes of street-ism ==
Streetism is the result of increased urbanisation and the difficult socio-economic circumstances rural families are experiencing. There are many root causes for the increasing number of street children in Accra and these root causes are very related. The relationship between the causes are strongly connected to power and privilege. Some children are on the streets because they were subjected to a certain level of power in the house and they believe that the street will be a place with little or no power. While others are underprivileged and take to the streets in search of money. Most of these underprivileged children are homeless because of the impact of divorce, death of a parent(s) or parent not being able to fend for their children. However, streetism in Ghana can be attributed to the following.

=== Poverty ===
Children who are from poor families in Ghana are likely to find themselves on the streets. Most of these children have parents who cannot take proper care of them. Some parents neglect a bit older kids so as to be able to cater for younger ones due to financial problems. These children ends up in streets where they find solace and also struggle to fend for themselves.

=== Parental neglect ===
Another related cause of streetism is parental neglect. Children who are from broken families in Ghana are mostly neglected by their parents. Their parents feel there is not a very big responsibilities for them to cater for these children. Most of these are in an attempt to punish their spouse wo has ended their relationships with them. The results of such acts by parents is these children moving into streets in an attempt to fend for themselves.

=== Rural urban migration ===
Most street children in Ghana are found in the major cities like Kumasi, Accra, and Tamale with only Accra housing more than 50,000 street children. These are partly because of rural urban migration. Many children move from rural areas to the major cities like Kumasi and Accra in search of greener pastures. These movement are mostly because of the constant economic activities going on at these areas. Since most of these children who move from rural areas have no family members in the cities, they end up forming alliances with other street children and end up being on the streets.

=== Second generational street children ===
Some children are born of parents who are on the streets. This automatically makes the street their homes, as such these children end up also being on the streets since they have nowhere else called home other than the street.

=== Truancy ===
Some children prefer to be on the streets other than any other places. Although these may be related to maltreatment in the house or at schools but they have nothing to do with financial predicament. Some children from rich families due to their preference of street lifestyle form alliances with others to engage in some social vices as well as end up in the streets.

== Effects of street-ism ==
Streetism has a variety of effects both on the children on the streets and the society in which they find themselves. Among these are as follows:

=== Health hazards ===
Health problems are major problems of street children in Ghana. Streetism exposes the children to a lot of health problems and other hazards. The children work in unconducive environments and they are vulnerable to defilement. Major diseases affecting street children include malaria, fever, cold, rashes, cholera, headache and infections. These children are at considerable risk and are more likely than other children to suffer from a serious physical injury due to an accident such as falling, drowning, fire, or ingesting poison.

=== Sexual assaults ===
Children in the streets lack all forms of security and easily fall prey to any possible harmful people. As a result, they are at a greater risk than other children of being physically and sexually abused by strangers and passers-by. These result in unwanted pregnancy which further exposes them to a lot more health hazards and sometimes death.

=== Increase in crime wave ===
Streetism poses a greater national threat to Ghana. Most crimes like armed robbery, prostitution, kidnapping and drug abuse can be related to streetism. Since most children who find themselves on streets are unable to have access to formal education and learning of trades, these children engage in such vices in an attempt to make ends meet. These however poses a greater national threat to the country hence the need to curb the menace.

== Possible solutions to street-ism ==
Like many other social problems, streetism can be effectively handled. In the first place, public education is the major means of controlling streetism in Ghana. Through public education parents, guardians, children and everyone will become aware of the effects of streetism on the development of the child. Organizations like Save a Street Child foundation have played a key role in public education and mentorship of street children and efforts like these go a long way in helping curb streetism. Rehabilitation is also one of the ways through which streetism can be solved. There should be rehabilitation for girls who become pregnant after they are delivered of their babies. The government should task the Department of Social Welfare to train teenage girls after they have given birth. This training programme will enable the girls to acquire skills in hair dressing, sowing, construction work, crafting, banking and others to enable them earn a living. The government should also promulgate legislation and enforce laws to stop the activities of street children.

== Related organizations ==
1. Save A Street Child Foundation
2. Future Of Africa (FOA)
3. Street Children Empowerment Foundation (SCEF)
4. Catholic Action for Street Children (CAS)
5. Chance for Children
6. Kaya ChildCare
7. Village of Hope and Hope Training Institute
8. Reach Out Street kids Feeding Programme LBG.
9. Street Girls Aid (S.Aid)
