= Street children in Eastern Europe =

Street children or orphans in some Eastern European countries face problems such as malnutrition, HIV, lack of resources, victimization though child sex tourism, social stigmatization and discrimination.

== Overview ==
Children living on the streets often come from a background of poverty and abuse, and a normal childhood is replaced by violence and crime. These children live in tunnels, garbage containers, and basements. In the winter, they take comfort from hot water pipes whose steam provides them with much needed warmth. However, in the early 2000s, as many of the Eastern European countries joined the European Union, they were required to deal with the situation of street children and orphans; and the situation has improved in many of these countries. Unemployment and the extremes of income inequality are some of the causes behind the phenomenon of street children in countries like Russia, Romania and Ukraine.

== Romania ==
The phenomenon of street children in Romania must be understood within a local, historical context. Under Nicolae Ceauşescu, both abortion and contraception were forbidden, leading to a rise in birth rates. In October 1966, the Decree 770 was enacted, which banned abortion, except in exceptional cases. There was an increase in the number of births in the following years, especially in the 1967-1968 period, which resulted in many children being abandoned. This forced children into orphanages run by disabled and mentally ill people. Together, these vulnerable groups were subjected to institutionalised neglect and abuse, including physical and sexual abuse as well as use of drugs to control behaviour. After the fall of communism (December 1989), the conditions which existed in the orphanages were leaked internationally, and created outrage. A news report on the American newsmagazine 20/20, which first aired on 5 October 1990, was the first to show the conditions in full detail on television. The 1990s was a difficult transition period, and it is during this period that the number of street children was very high. Some ran away or were thrown out of orphanages or abusive homes, and were often seen begging or roaming around the Bucharest Metro; this situation was presented in a documentary called Children Underground, which depicted the life of Romanian street children in 2001. In the 21st century, Romania has taken drastic steps to stop the phenomenons of mistreatment and exploitation of children and child abandonment, and to improve the situation of orphans, especially as it prepared itself to become a member of the European Union. As such, the number of street children declined markedly. Around 2004, about 500 children lived permanently in the streets of Bucharest, while other children (less than 1,500) worked in the streets during the day, but returned home to their families in the evenings - making a total of 2,000 street children in Romania's capital. Child begging is a problem that Romania has taken many steps to prevent, including criminalizing it under the Penal Code, as well as through other civil sanctions that can be applied to parents. Parents who encourage or force children under 18 to beg or to prostitute themselves can face criminal charges. With regard to the right to education of children, parents/legal guardians are obligated to ensure the child gets an education; failure to do so can result in criminal prosecution (Art. 380 Preventing access to compulsory public education). Also, according to Art 33 of Law No. 61/1991 penalising the violation of public order and social standards, parents/legal guardians who fail to take "adequate measures" to prevent children under 16 from engaging in vagrancy, begging, or prostitution are liable to pay a contraventional fine (Law No. 61/1991 on contraventions applies only in cases when the deed of the guilty party does not constitute a criminal offense).

== Moldova ==
Some children in Moldova face abandonment by parents. In Moldova, there are now programs aimed at rehabilitating former street children. In the early 2010s, these programs reduced the numbers of street children significantly. However, these issues continue to persist in modern times with new research shedding light on the problems with children's rights.

== Ukraine ==
In Ukraine, "a social orphan" is a child with one or more living parents who are unable to care for them. The Centre of Motherhood and Childhood, a project supported by UNICEF and its partners in Kherson, provide mothers in poverty with clothes for their children, a place to live, and medical care, so that mothers may avoid abandoning children due to lack of necessary resources. Homeless children in Ukraine typically sleep in manholes or basements, under bridges or on top of hot water pipes. There are up to 4,000 homeless children that live in squalor on the streets of Odesa. Homeless young people often inhale glue or inject cold and flu medicine as ways of taking drugs. Young people turn to inhaling glue as the fumes suppress feelings of cold and hunger and produce auditory and visual hallucinations. Violence, sexual abuse and drug addiction are common among homeless children in Odesa. Many homeless children in Odesa are at high risk for HIV due to the large number sharing needles and engaging in unsafe sex. The base rate of infection is higher than the 1% of the population that epidemiologists say is a critical threshold. The outreach teams claim that close to 1 in 10 of all children tested turned out to be HIV positive UNICEF is currently implementing assistance to these homeless children most notably ‘The Way Home’ which sends an outreach team to visit street children each week. The outreach team provides street children with clean water, food and basic first aid. During the summer, they set up an outdoor camp, giving youths a chance to enjoy activities such as swimming and playing.

== Russia ==
According to the Department of Social Population Protection in Moscow says the city has 4,142 children who are beznadzorniye (neglected), or besprizorniki (homeless). Many Russian children still live outside of the family unit, despite progress in developing family-style alternatives to institutionalization; 156,000 children are currently housed in orphanages or boarding homes. MSF, an international medical organization also known as Doctors Without Borders, which has worked with them since 2003, estimates that there are about 2,000. Numbers from MSF reveal that fifty percent of the street children consume alcohol regularly; 77.8 percent smoke cigarettes; 27.4 percent inhale glue. About one-thirduse butorphanol, which is classified as a prescription drug but loosely regulated, and are freely able to purchase it at pharmacies. Moscow's department for homeless and neglected children is currently trying to decrease the number of children living on the street. Police bring street children to hospitals where for one to two weeks they undergo examinations and receive medical care. They are then “placed in priyuty, shelters that provide medical services, education and rehabilitation, and where children are received regardless of nationality and the legal documents they hold. Each child’s length of stay depends on what rehabilitative measures are needed. Street children in Russia often miss out on proper education due to the difficulties of living on the streets. Specialists claim that it is possible to reverse homelessness for children if they have been living on the street for less than six months though it is harder if it’s longer since they may have already become used to finding their own ways to survive UNICEF partner Samu Social currently provides emergency assistance, food and water for street children in Moscow. Samu Social sees its mission “as a kind of link in the chain from emergency help for such young people to their social rehabilitation”
