= Poverty in the Philippines =

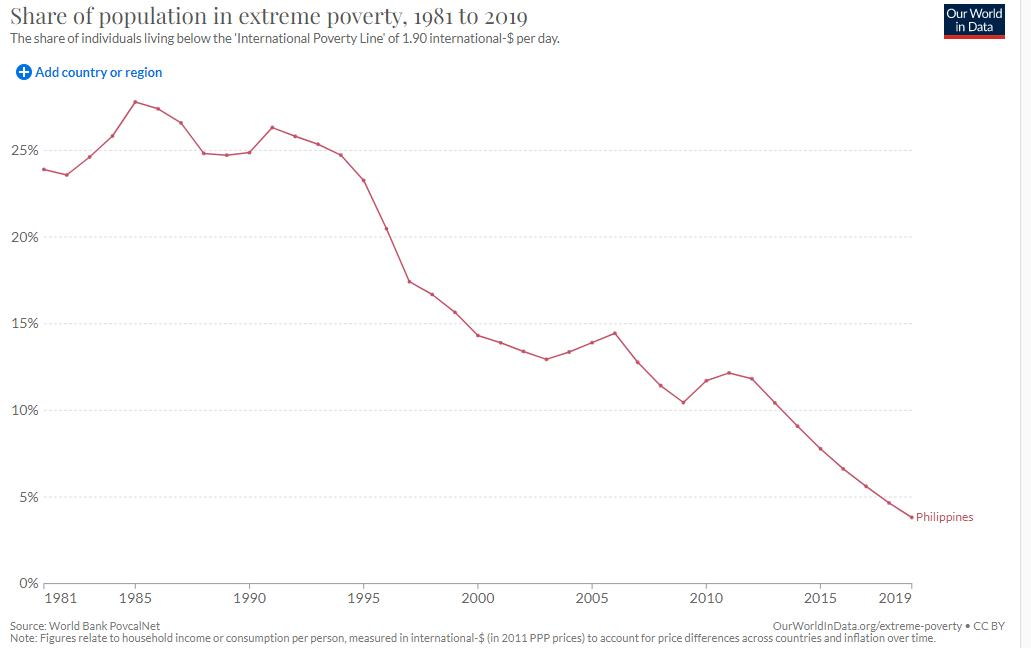
Share of population in extreme poverty (1981–2019)

Despite improvements in recent years, poverty in the Philippines remains high, and the pace of poverty reduction has been slower compared to other East Asian countries. Economic growth in the Philippines was less inclusive and slower than in high-performing neighbors, resulting in a lag in poverty reduction. Between 2006 and 2015, the country's poverty rate, measured by the international poverty line (US$1.90/day), declined by only 0.9 percentage points annually, compared to 2–2.5 percentage points in China, Indonesia, and Vietnam. When measured by the lower-middle-income-class poverty line (US$3.20/day), poverty declined by just 1.3 percentage points annually, while same three countries saw reductions of 3–5 percentage points.

In 2023, the Philippine Statistics Authority (PSA) set the national poverty threshold at ₱13,873 per month for a family of five (approximately US$250), or about ₱92.49 per person per day (around US$1.67). Individuals are considered "poor" if their income falls below this threshold, which is intended to cover basic food and non-food needs. However, the PSA acknowledged that the food component of this threshold was not sufficient to meet the minimum daily dietary or nutritional requirements, suggesting that even those not classified as "food poor" may still be undernourished. In 2023, official government statistics reported that the Philippines had a poverty rate of 15.5%, (or roughly 17.54 million Filipinos), significantly lower than the 49.2 percent recorded in 1985 through years of government poverty reduction efforts. From 2018 to 2021, an estimated 2.3 million Filipinos fell into poverty amid the economic recession caused by the COVID-19 pandemic.

National Economic and Development Authority (NEDA) deputy director general Rosemarie Edillon attributed the overall decline of poverty in the Philippines to a generally low and stable inflation, improved incomes, and higher employment rates during the period. In 2022, the poverty situation in the Philippines has seen a steady improvement.

Some of the many causes of poverty are bad governance, corruption, a political system dominated by political dynasties, the lack of available jobs, and vulnerability to environmental disasters.

Poverty in the Philippines means the condition where individuals or families do not have enough income or resources to meet their basic needs such as food, shelter, clothing, healthcare, and education. It reflects a lack of access to opportunities that allow people to improve their living standards. In simple terms, poverty in the Philippines means struggling to afford the essentials needed for a decent and secure life.

== Definition ==
As of 2022, the Philippine Statistics Authority has set the poverty threshold at PHP12,030 per month for a family of five, or about PHP80 per day per person to spend on food and non-food requirements.

== Background ==
As of 2021, about 19.99 million Filipinos lived in poverty. Through various anti-poverty programs, such as the Comprehensive Agrarian Reform, Lingap Para sa Mahirap, and the Social Reform Agenda, the Philippines has been through a long battle to ameliorate that statistic. Despite these governmental efforts, the Millennium Development Goal milestone of poverty reduction has been a slow process.

=== Demographics ===
2021 map of cities and municipalities where poverty is prevalent. Areas close to red indicate higher poverty rates.

People living in poverty in the Philippines are most likely self-employed farmers, fishermen, or agricultural workers. Three-quarters of these people live in severe disaster-risk areas that are highly rural. In 2015, about 58 percent of poor households have more than six members. Education overall has improved over time; from the ages of 15–24, over 75 percent have completed secondary education or above in 2015. Specifically in poor households, however, over 60 percent of families have education only up to elementary school.

As of 2022, the Bangsamoro Autonomous Region in Muslim Mindanao has the highest incidence of poverty in the country at 37.2%, while Metro Manila has the lowest at 3.5%.

Children in the Philippines are particularly vulnerable to the effects of poverty and suffer high rates of mortality for those below 5 years old. The UNICEF and World Bank reported that as of 2022, more than 32 million children were living in poverty in the Philippines, including 5 million children living in extreme poverty.

Over 10 million women live in poverty in the Philippines.

A 2024 survey conducted by the Social Weather Stations from September 14 to 23, 2024, estimated 16.3 million Filipino families considered themselves poor compared to 12.9 million in March 2024. Self-rated poverty was highest in Mindanao (67 percent), followed by Visayas (62 percent), and Luzon (55 percent, excluding Metro Manila). Metro Manila was the lowest self-rated poverty at 52 percent.

=== Hunger ===
In 2025, the Philippines ranked as the most food insecure country in the Southeast Asian region. The Philippines ranked 67th out of 127 countries in the Global Hunger Index of 2024, with the level of hunger described as "moderate". According to a 2018 study by the United Nations World Food Programme, while nearly all households in the Philippines can afford a diet that provides enough energy, only one third of the overall population can afford a diet that provides sufficient nutrients. Around 2.9 million Filipino families experienced hunger in the third quarter of 2022, according to a survey by the Social Weather Stations.

=== Homelessness ===
Homeless people in Rizal Park, Manila, 2018

Out of the country's population of about 106 million, an estimated 4.5 million were homeless according to the Philippine Statistics Authority; of these, 3 million were in the capital Manila. The Philippine government allotted ₱65.43 billion for housing projects from 2015 to 2022. According to the Philippine Commission on Audit, the National Housing Authority failed to achieve its targets repeatedly, citing instances of project delays and unoccupied housing units, causing worsened homelessness in the country.

=== Health ===
Out-of-pocket health expenses make up 45% of the average household's health expenses. These expenses, meaning those not covered by government or private insurance, are high for Filipino families and tends to worsen their health and their poverty.

The Philippines only has a ratio of 17.1 health care workers for every 10,000 people, compared with the recommended 44.5 for every 10,000 needed to attain the Sustainable Development Goals. The poorest provinces have the least developed health services, with gaps in health outcomes exacerbated by gaps in income and wealth inequality, according to IBON Foundation. In the Bangsamoro Autonomous Region in Muslim Mindanao, which had the highest poverty incidence in 2021, there are only 8.9 health care workers for every 10,000 people.

== Causes of poverty ==
Poverty in the Philippines has been linked to bad governance, corruption, and a political system dominated by political dynasties. The country's poorest provinces are ruled by political dynasties. Additionally, there are the problem of extractive institutions that hinder the country's economic growth.

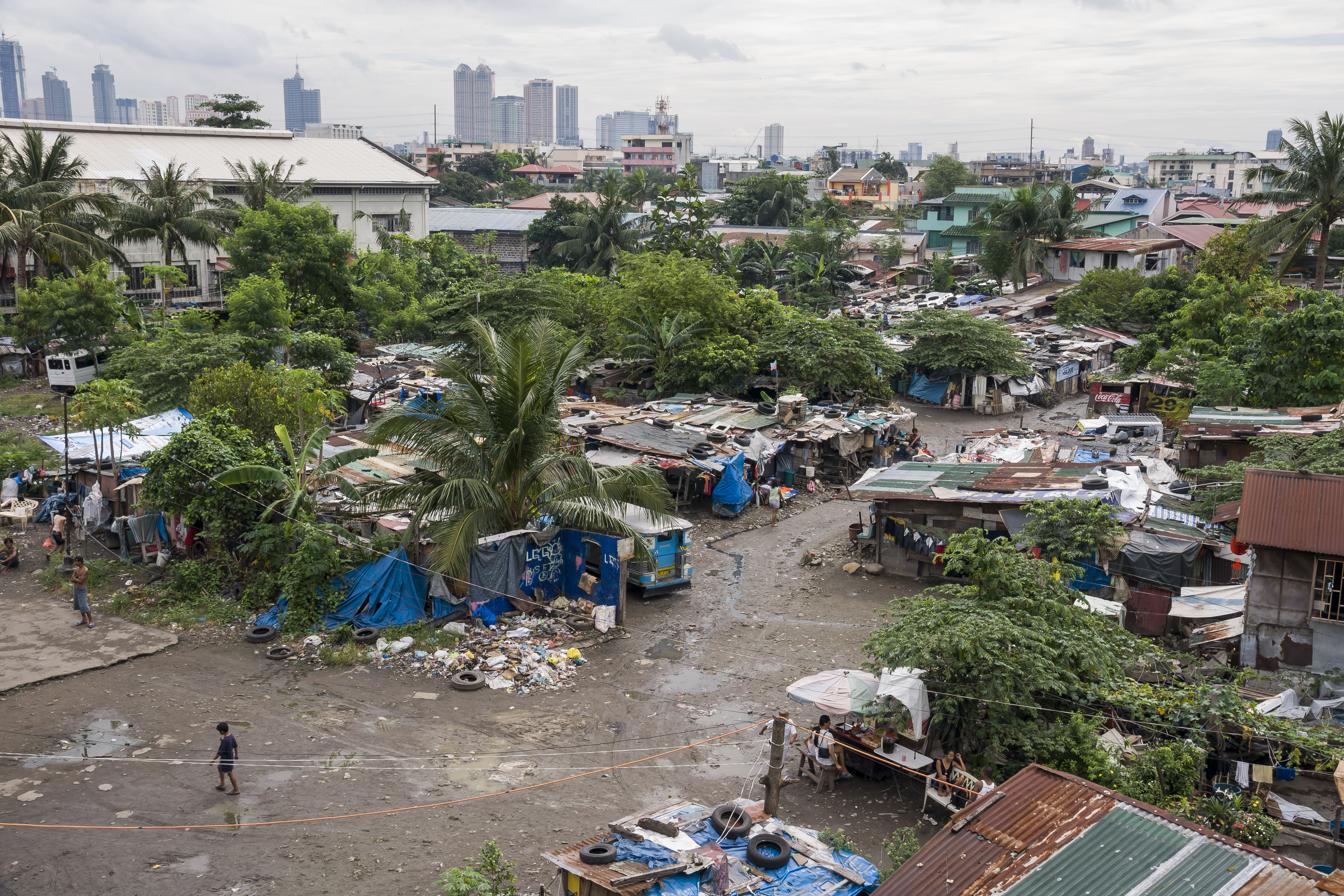
An informal settlement in Mandaluyong, Metro Manila, 2008

Poverty in the Philippines also had its roots from land inequality resulting from land policies under colonization by Spain and the United States.

The Philippines, after its independence in 1946, historically pursued an import substitution industrial policy, penalizing primary and agricultural sectors through tariffs and overvaluing the peso. These policies between the 1950s and 1980s diverted resources from agriculture and favored manufacturing. Price controls, import restrictions, and government interventions in sectors like rice, coconut, and fertilizer further depressed agricultural incomes.

The overvalued peso, tariffs, and government regulation negatively impacted agricultural investment and productivity. The coconut sector, once the country's most important agricultural industry, experienced stagnant productivity between 1982-85 and 1962-66. Low agricultural productivity continues to hinder overall economic growth, partly due to maintained tariffs and slower growth in the agriculture, fishing, and forestry sectors compared to other sectors.

Natural disasters have exacerbated poverty in the Philippines. Natural disasters in the Philippines have caused US$23 billion in damages since 1990, which continues to delay the development process. The frequent occurrences of typhoons cost the country lives, illness, malnutrition, and denial of education and health services. Filipino farmers are some of the most vulnerable, because floods and landslides severely affect their crops and income.

The poorest populations work in agriculture and live in areas prone to natural disasters compared to the wealthier population. There is an inadequate number of available good jobs, and a lack of investment in education, which leads to such a high inequality of income. However, the government has plans focused on reducing poverty with the objective of improving the lives of the poorest segments of the population.

The pattern of poverty growth is common in rural areas, but there has been a rise in poverty in urban areas. Cities in the Philippines have been faced with an increase in poverty due to a lack of well-paid employment.

=== Joblessness and low pay ===
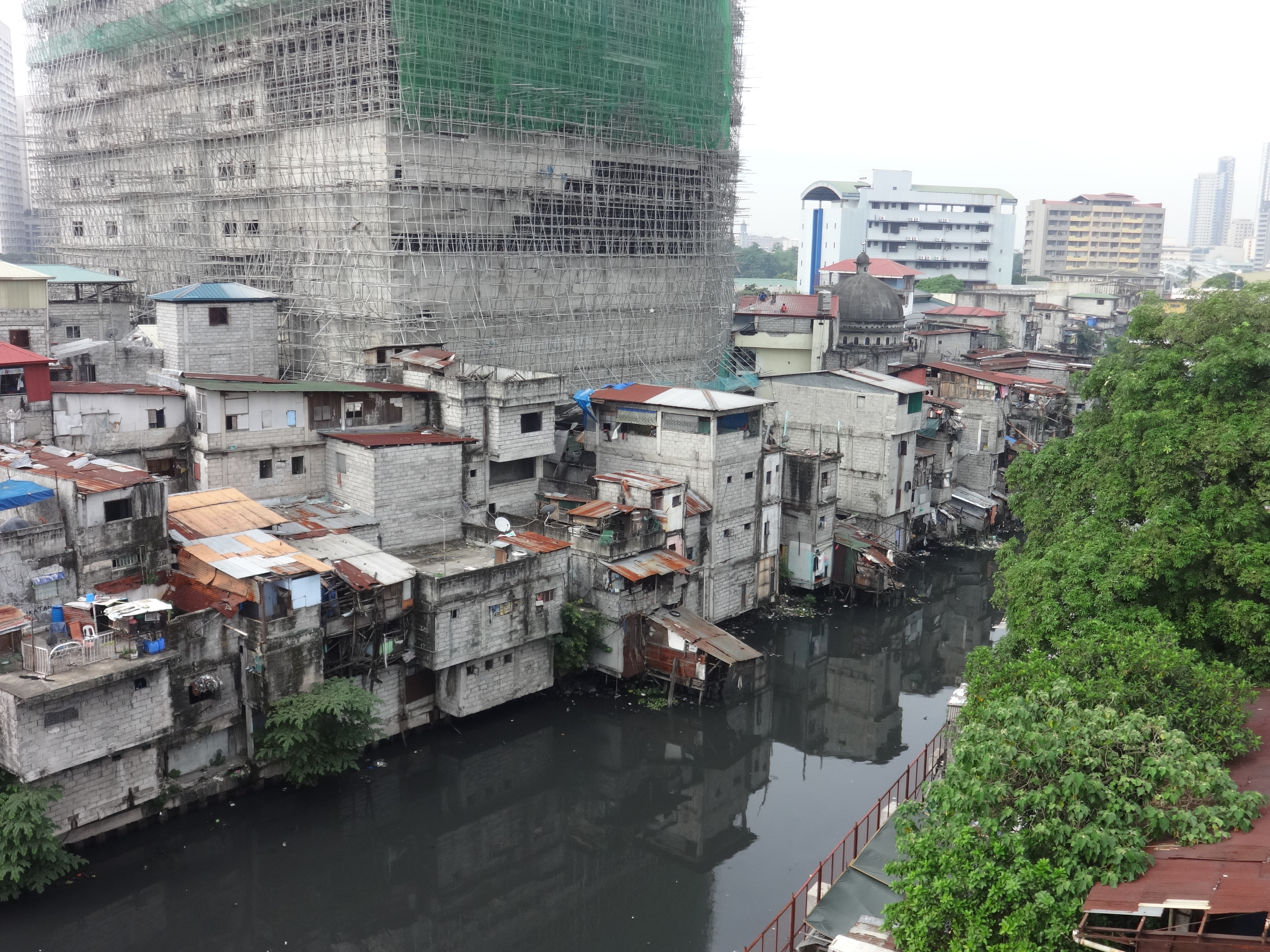
Informal settlements along a creek in Quiapo, Manila, 2019

According to IBON Foundation, self-rated poverty rises due to the lack of good job opportunities, low wages, and high cost of living, exacerbated by inflation.

Despite fast increases on employment opportunities beginning in the 1990s, the unemployment rate remains high in the Philippines due to overpopulation, increased participation in the labor force, lack of opportunities, and weak industry resulting in inadequate job creation.

The majority of the working poor in the Philippines are informal or non-wage workers who are not protected by the Philippine Government's minimum wage policy. Only about half of the working poor are wage workers. In 2015, over 90 percent of low-paid workers were employed informally, making them ineligible for minimum wage protection. Consequently, less than 2 percent of the working poor benefit from the minimum wage policy, highlighting its limited effectiveness in addressing in-work poverty.

==== Contractualization ====
Endo (derived from "end-of-contract") refers to a short-term de facto employment practice in the Philippines. It is a form of contractualization in which companies provide workers with temporary "employment" that lasts for less than six months (or strictly speaking, 180 calendar days) and then terminate their employment just before they can be regularized, to skirt the costs that come with the benefits of regularization. Some examples of such benefits are the de jure "employer-and-employee relationship"-mandated SSS / GSIS, PhilHealth, and Pag-IBIG Fund contributions, paid time off (leaves), and a 13th month pay, among others.

=== High cost of living ===
Informal settlements in Mandaue City, with the University of Cebu campus in the background, 2022

Amid stagnant wages, food inflation affects poor families more than the rest of the population. Inflation levels reported by the Philippine Statistics Authority in 2024 was driven by rising electricity rates, more expensive meat and fruits, and rising oil prices. Policy suggestions to address poverty and the effects of inflation include wage hikes and ensuring the affordability of basic needs, and developing the capacity to produce food locally to lessen dependence on imports.

=== Culture of poverty ===
According to a 1973 study of Sylvia H. Guerrero in Metro Manila, the "culture of poverty" in the Philippines is characterized by a lack of aspirations, reliance on chance, and disillusionment with the social, economic, and political conditions.

Another factor that contributes to these bleak situations were corruption, unresolved legal cases, and high crime rates. Filipinos' patience, tolerance for frustration, and religiosity allow a culture of poverty to persist in Philippine society.

=== Poverty during the COVID-19 pandemic ===
From 2018 to 2021, amid the economic recession caused by the COVID-19 pandemic, an estimated 2.3 million Filipinos fell into poverty; this has been attributed in part to lockdowns enacted to control the spread of the disease and possibly exacerbated by poor governance.

== Threshold and incidence ==
Poverty threshold and incidence vary by geographic region. The threshold ranged from PHP 12,241 to PHP15,713, and the incidence rate ranged from 1.1% to 2 4.2% as of 2023.

=== Poverty among farmers ===
Farmers working in a rice field on Luzon

Farmers and fishers belong to the poorest sectors of Philippine society. The incidence of poverty among farmers was estimated at 31.6% in 2018 (compared to the 16.7% national poverty incidence), according to data from the Philippine Statistics Authority (PSA). Poverty incidence among farmers stood at 30% and fisherfolk at 30.6% in 2021, according to PSA data.

Low-skilled agricultural workers usually receive wages at rates following the regional daily minimum wage set by the government. These rates are close to the national poverty threshold.

The issue of low wages may be compounded by landlessness among farmers, as well as contractual and informal work arrangements that do not provide job security or continuing access to statutory benefits (such as health benefits and other social safety nets). Contractual and informal work arrangements also create barriers that prevent farmers from exercising their constitutional right to free association and collective bargaining, which in turn prevent workers from gaining higher pay and developing new skills.

=== Poverty among Indigenous peoples ===
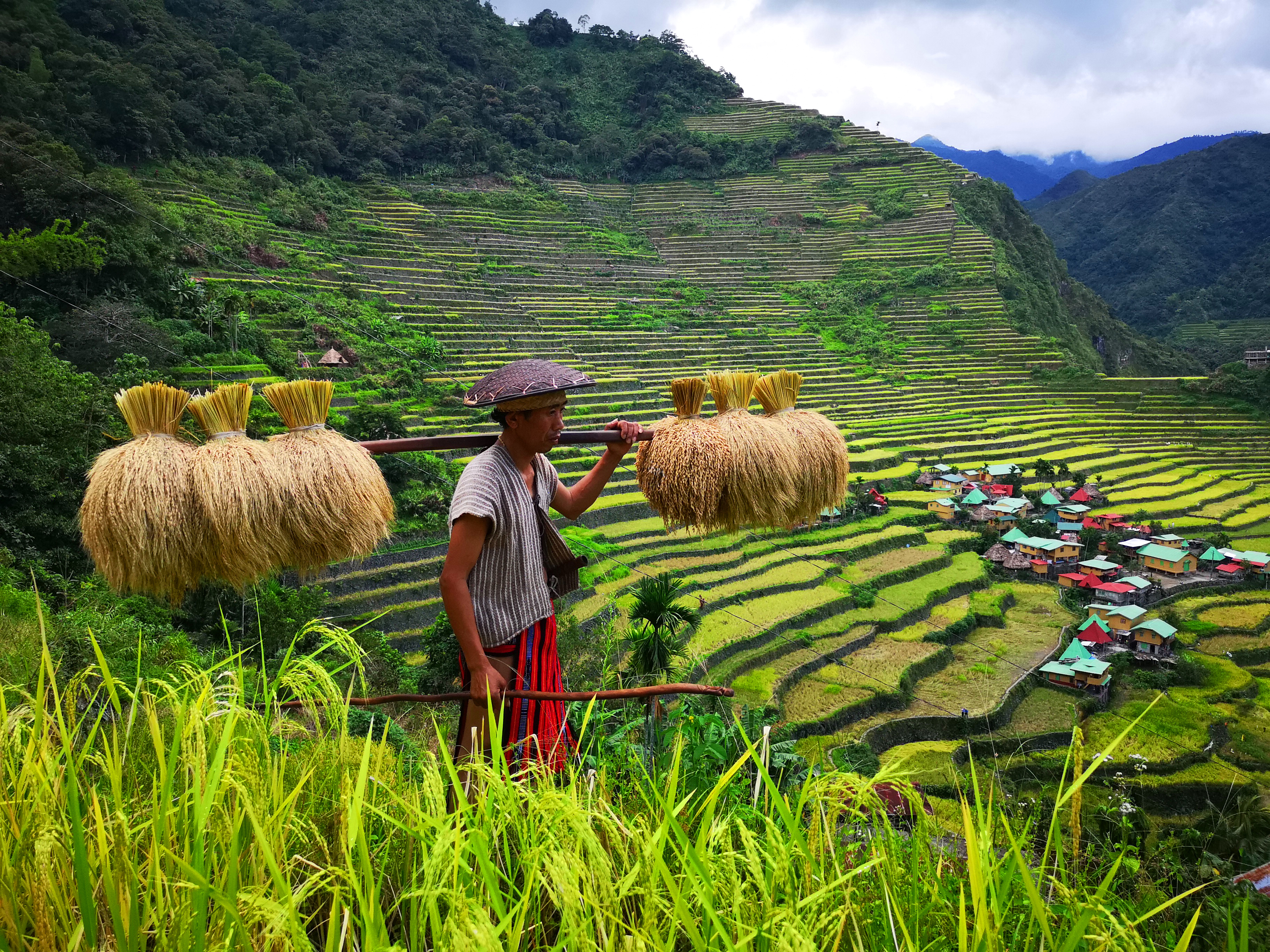
An Ifugao man harvesting rice at the Batad Rice Terraces.

Indigenous communities in the Philippines face challenges in gaining ownership and control of their ancestral lands. They may lack access to resources and face discrimination and poverty. In 2025, the PSA reported that 32.4% of Indigenous peoples lived below the poverty threshold, making them the most affected group, followed by fisherfolk (27.4 % living in poverty), and farmers (27%).

== Comparison to other Southeast Asian countries ==
According to data provided by the World Bank, economic growth in the Philippines competes sufficiently with the GDP per capita percent growth of neighboring countries; the Philippine GDP per capita in 2021 was $3,548.8 compared to 3,694.0 in Vietnam, and 4,291.8 in Indonesia. Declination of poverty is slower in the Philippines because urbanization and industrialization is progressing faster elsewhere. This advancement allows people to leave their agricultural-based work to a factory job with a higher paying income. The country has made movement out of the labor-intensive work in populous regions, such as Manila, however the country as a whole has made slower improvements. In addition to slow progress, natural disasters in the Philippines is one of the biggest conductors of poverty. While other countries are able to develop without consistent disturbances, the Philippines is forced to start from the ground up after every single occurrence.

The Economist in 2017 stated that the Philippines' poverty reduction has lagged far behind China, Vietnam, and Thailand. Growth is also concentrated in Manila while other provinces in the country are neglected and hardly progress.

== Poverty reduction ==
=== Poverty rate declines ===
According to the World Bank, poverty rates declined from 26.6 percent in 2006 to 21.6 percent in 2015. The country has attempted to increase income and opportunities and reverse impacts of occurring natural disasters. The Philippine Development Plan of 2017–2022 and the AmBisyon Natin 2040 are proposals for the nation to decrease poverty and improve the lives of the poorest population. These policies include creating more and better jobs, improving productivity, investing in health and nutrition, managing disaster risks, protecting the vulnerable, and more. These documents help set the overall goal of reducing poverty to 13–15 percent by 2022 and having the nation thrive at similar levels as surrounding countries. The strategic plans that the Philippine government has created are intended to work towards a middle-class society where poverty is reduced and living conditions are improved.

=== Drivers of poverty reduction ===
The main drivers between 2006 and 2015 were an increase in wage income and movement of employment out of agriculture, government transfers, and remittances from domestic and foreign sources, according to the World Bank publication, Making Growth Work for the Poor. Movement from agricultural jobs to lower-end industry jobs led to an increase in wages and accounted for 50 percent of the reduction in poverty. The majority of farm workers and fishers have remained poor, according to the Philippine Statistics Authority.

In addition, a factor in the decline of poverty is the growth of population. A 1.7 percent increase in population a year has resulted in a 3.8 percent increase in per capita GDP growth. An additional factor is an increase of school enrollment and a decrease in dropout rates. Despite a lack of distribution, the water, sanitation, and electricity of the Philippines have also improved. Other socioeconomic indicators, such as social safety nets and health insurance, have also been beneficial factors. In addition, drivers of reduction also include the influx of economic expansion that has grown the economy.

Programs for the economic welfare of children and women will be subject to significant budget cuts under the Philippines government's proposed budget for 2024.However, challenges remain as income inequality and regional disparities continue to limit the full impact of poverty reduction efforts in the country.

== See also ==
- Slums in Metro Manila
- Street children in the Philippines
