= 2025 Caloocan local elections =

17th City and Mayoral elections in Caloocan

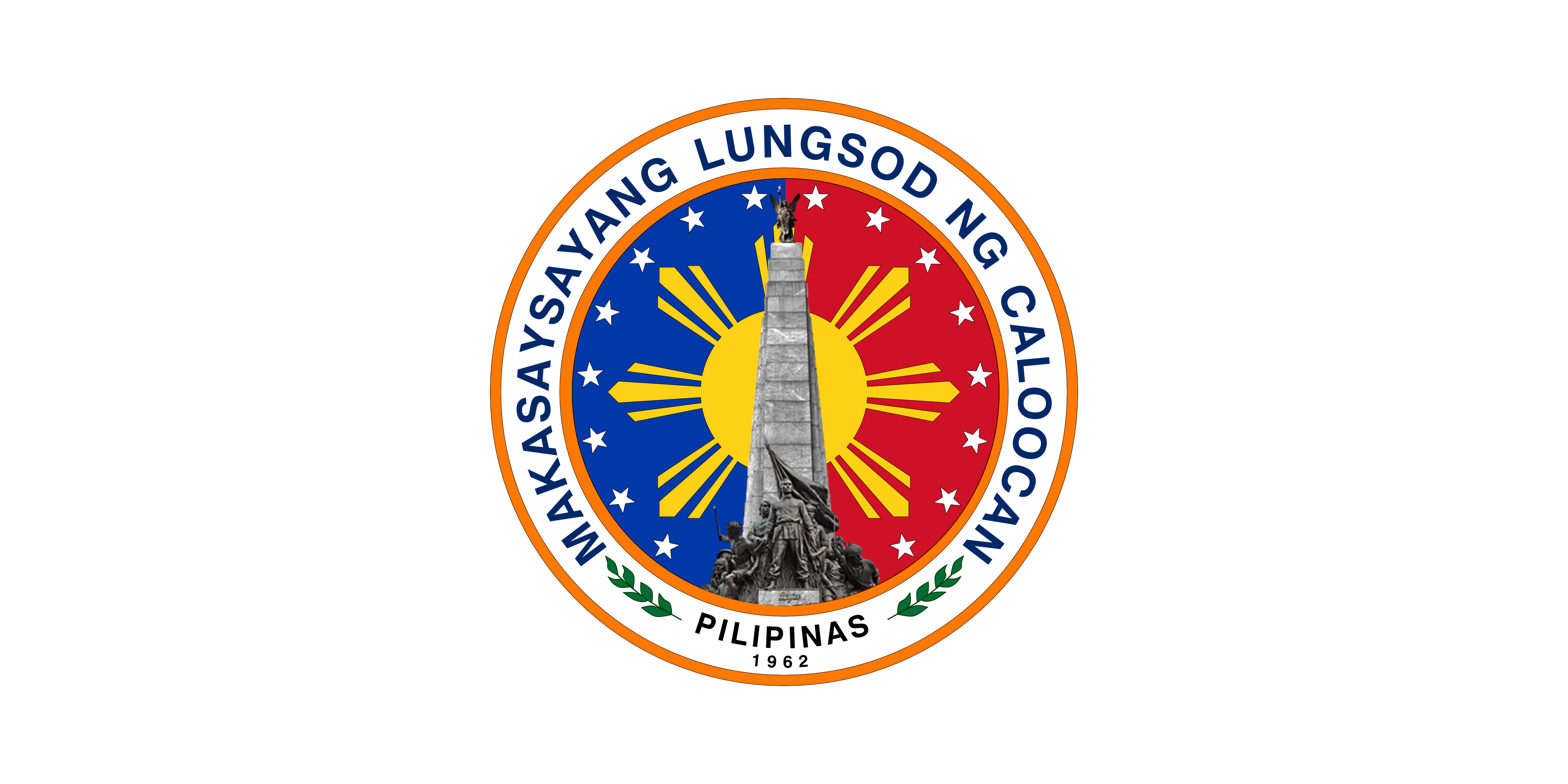
← 2022	May 12, 2025	2028 →
- Mayoral election
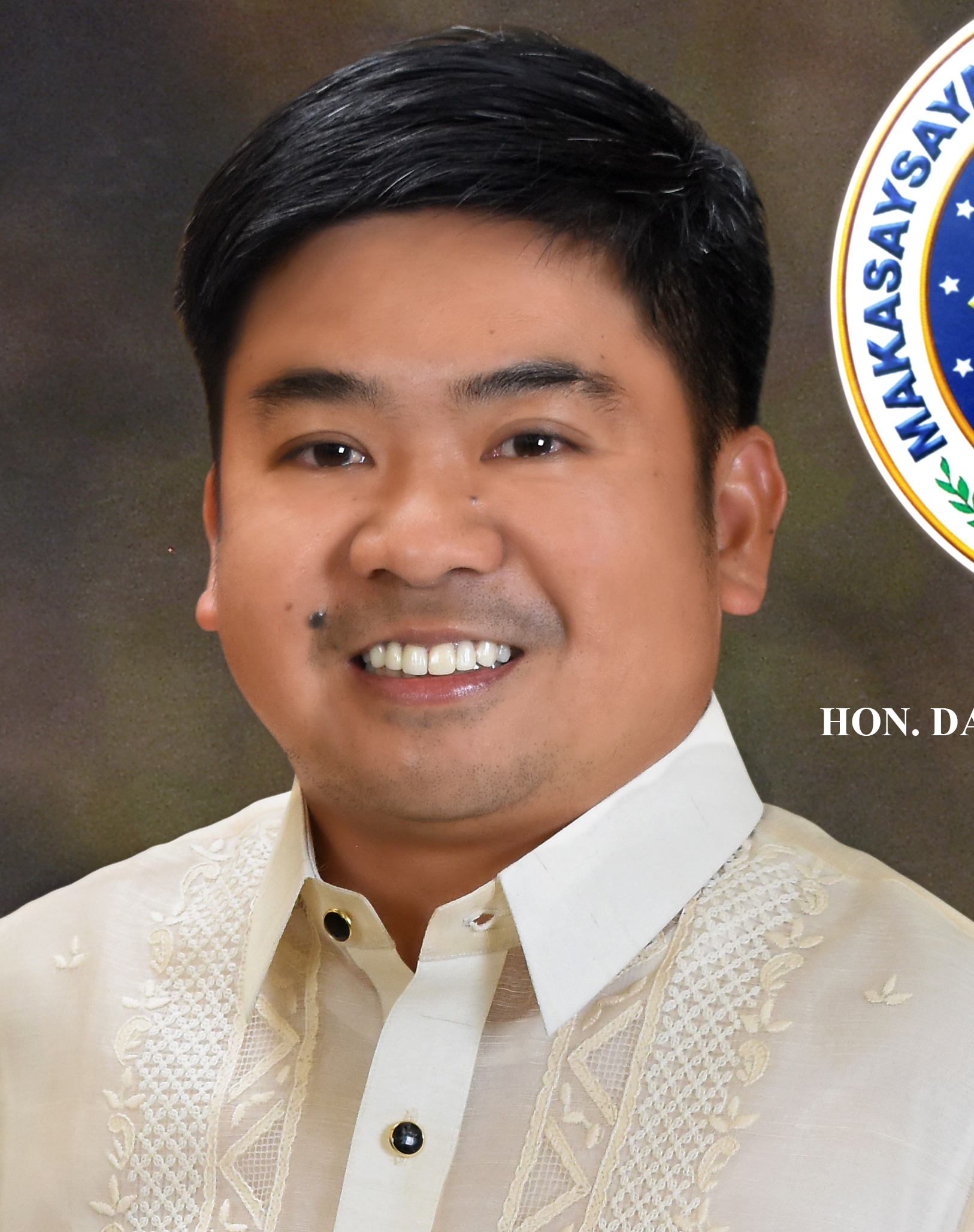

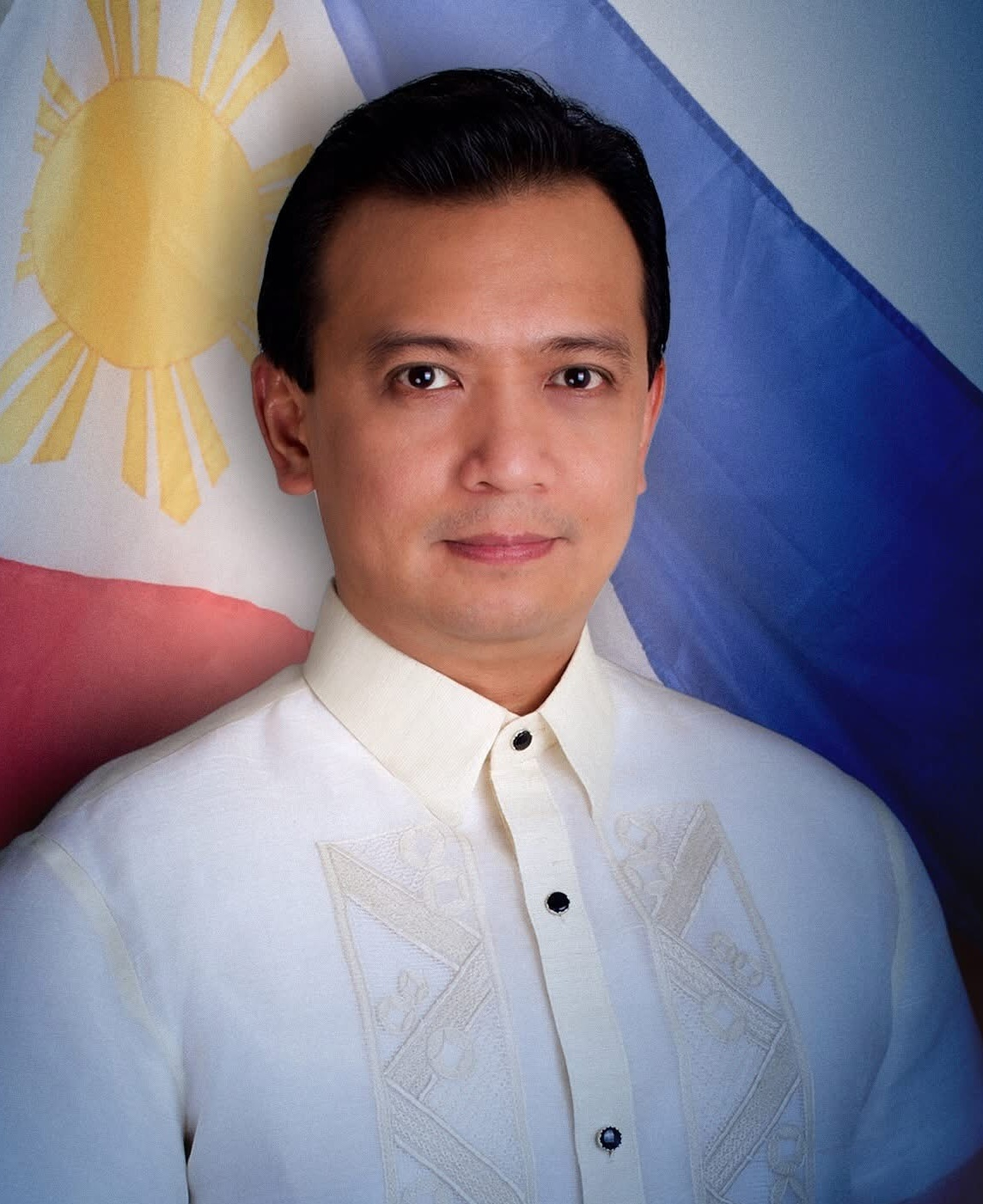
Candidate	Along Malapitan	Antonio Trillanes
Party	Nacionalista	Aksyon
Alliance	Team Aksyon at Malasakit	Team Trillanes
Running mate	Karina Teh	PJ Malonzo
Popular vote	348,211	229,512
Percentage	59.49%	39.22%
Mayor before election
Along Malapitan
Nacionalista
Elected mayor
Along Malapitan
Nacionalista
- Vice mayoral election
Candidate	Karina Teh	PJ Malonzo
Party	Nacionalista	Aksyon
Alliance	Team Aksyon at Malasakit	Team Trillanes
Popular vote	350,980	196,707
Percentage	62.32%	34.93%
Vice Mayor before election
Karina Teh-Limsico
Nacionalista
Elected Vice Mayor
Karina Teh-Limsico
Nacionalista
- City Council election

18 of 20 seats in the Caloocan City Council 11 seats needed for a majority
	First party	Second party	Third party
Party	Nacionalista	Liberal	Aksyon
Alliance	Team Aksyon at Malasakit	Team Bughaw	Team Trillanes
Last election	10 seats, 33.67%	Did not contest	3 seats, 32.76%
Seats won	7	2	1
Seat change	▼3	▲2	▼2
Popular vote	1,583,451	217,730	527,361
Percentage	55.77%	7.67%	18.57%
	Fourth party	Fifth party
Party	Lakas	NUP
Alliance	Team Aksyon at Malasakit	Team Aksyon at Malasakit
Last election	2 seats, 6.14%	1 seats, 3.16%
Seats won	1	1
Seat change	1	1
Popular vote	82,626	88,633
Percentage	2.91%	3.12%

Local elections were held in Caloocan on May 12, 2025, as part of the 2025 Philippine general election. The electorate will elect a mayor, a vice mayor, 18 members of the Caloocan City Council, and three district representatives to the House of Representatives of the Philippines. The officials elected will assume their respective offices on June 30, 2025, for a three-year-long term.

== Candidates ==
Incumbents are italicized.

=== Administration coalition ===
Team Aksyon at Malasakit 2025 (ABP)
Position	#	Candidate	Party
Mayor	2.	Along Malapitan	Nacionalista
Vice Mayor	3.	Karina Teh-Limsico	Nacionalista
House Representative (1st district)	2.	Oscar Malapitan	Nacionalista
House Representative (2nd district)	1.	Mitch Cajayon-Uy	Lakas
House Representative (3rd district)	1.	Dean Asistio	Lakas
City Councilor (1st district)	1.	Topet Adalem	Nacionalista
City Councilor (1st district)	2.	Leah Bacolod	Nacionalista
City Councilor (1st district)	3.	Marjorie Barretto	Nacionalista
City Councilor (1st district)	5.	Alex Caralde	Nacionalista
City Councilor (1st district)	9.	Vince Hernandez	Nacionalista
City Councilor (1st district)	12.	Enteng Malapitan	Nacionalista
City Councilor (2nd district)	1.	James Abel	Nacionalista
City Councilor (2nd district)	2.	Lanz Almeda	NUP
City Councilor (2nd district)	3.	Ken Aruelo	Lakas
City Councilor (2nd district)	4.	Cons Asistio	Nacionalista
City Councilor (2nd district)	8.	Carol Cunanan	Nacionalista
City Councilor (2nd district)	11.	Arnold Divina	Nacionalista
City Councilor (3rd district)	1.	Win Abel	Nacionalista
City Councilor (3rd district)	2.	May Africa	Nacionalista
City Councilor (3rd district)	4.	Tess Ceralde	Nacionalista
City Councilor (3rd district)	6.	King Echiverri	Nacionalista
City Councilor (3rd district)	8.	Onet Henson	Nacionalista
City Councilor (3rd district)	13.	Bullet Prado	Nacionalista

=== Primary opposition coalition ===
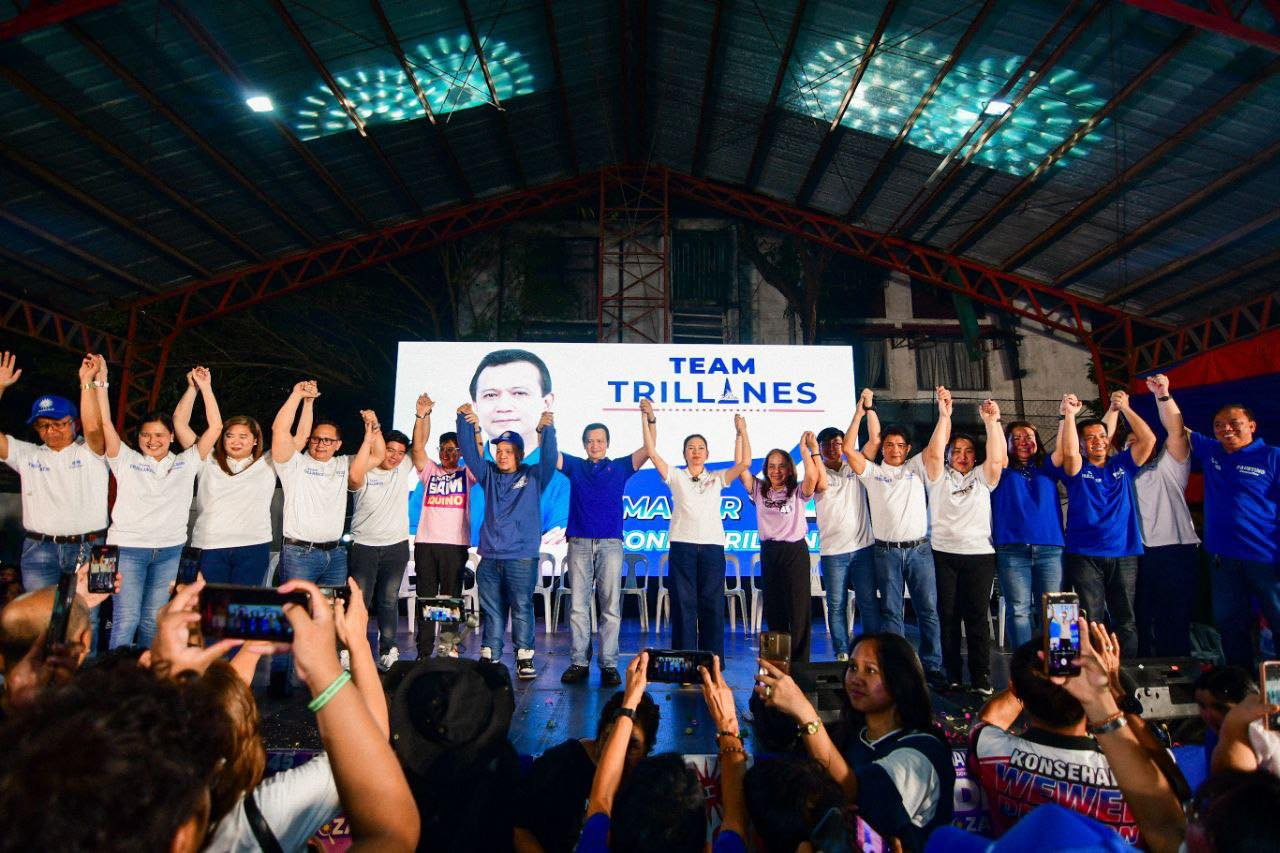
Team Trillanes during their proclamation rally in BF Homes Caloocan on March 28, 2025

Team Trillanes-Malonzo (KiBam)
Position	#	Candidate	Party
Mayor	4.	Antonio Trillanes	Aksyon
Vice Mayor	2.	PJ Malonzo	Aksyon
House Representative (1st district)	3.	Rey Malonzo	KANP
City Councilor (1st district)	4.	Mickey Bunag	Aksyon
City Councilor (1st district)	8.	Mining Faustino	Aksyon
City Councilor (1st district)	10.	Angie Leonardo	Aksyon
City Councilor (1st district)	15.	Kaye Nubla	Aksyon
City Councilor (2nd district)	9.	Wewel De Leon	Aksyon
City Councilor (2nd district)	13.	Mayen Mercado	Aksyon
City Councilor (2nd district)	15.	Jefferson Paspie	Aksyon
City Councilor (3rd district)	3.	Rowel Brin	Aksyon
City Councilor (3rd district)	9.	Rose Mercado	Aksyon
City Councilor (3rd district)	10.	Alou Nubla	Aksyon

=== Third parties ===
Team Bughaw 2025 (KiBam)
Position	#	Name	Party
House Representative (2nd district)	2.	Edgar Erice	Liberal
City Councilor (2nd district)	12.	Alex Mangasar	Liberal
City Councilor (2nd district)	16.	Charm Quimpo	Liberal
City Councilor (2nd district)	17.	Lemuel Simpauco	Liberal

Candidates not in tickets
Position	#	Name	Party
City Councilor (1st district)	13.	Ricardo Margallo	Makabayan
City Councilor (2nd district)	6.	Renato Celis	PRP

=== Independents ===
Candidates not in tickets
Position	#	Name	Party
Mayor	1.	Richard Cañete	Independent
Mayor	3.	Ronnie Malunes	Independent
Mayor	5.	Danny Villanueva	Independent
Vice Mayor	1.	Dante Lustre	Independent
Vice Mayor	4.	Joseph Timbol	Independent
Vice Mayor	5.	Rolando Tobias	Independent
House Representative (1st district)	1.	Johram Alama	Independent
City Councilor (1st district)
City Councilor (1st district)	6.	Tyrone De Leon Sr.	Independent
City Councilor (1st district)	7.	Roman Domasig Jr.	Independent
City Councilor (1st district)	11.	Buddy Lipata	Independent
City Councilor (1st district)	14.	George Miran	Independent
City Councilor (1st district)	16.	Edsan Pineda	Independent
City Councilor (1st district)	17.	Jericho Sy	Independent
City Councilor (1st district)	18.	Patricio Tapiengco III	Independent
City Councilor (1st district)	19.	Anser Tomas	Independent
City Councilor (2nd district)
City Councilor (2nd district)	5.	Dennis Baldivia	Independent
City Councilor (2nd district)	7.	Joehari Cudiamat	Independent
City Councilor (2nd district)	10.	Freddie Del Rosario	Independent
City Councilor (2nd district)	14.	Joe Palicte	Independent
City Councilor (2nd district)	18.	Jennet Tam	Independent
City Councilor (2nd district)	19.	Joseph Tenorio	Independent
City Councilor (3rd district)
City Councilor (3rd district)	5.	Bernard Domingo	Independent
City Councilor (3rd district)	7.	Albert Gabuay	Independent
City Councilor (3rd district)	11.	Julita Omit	Independent
City Councilor (3rd district)	12.	Merly Padilla	Independent
City Councilor (3rd district)	14.	Carina Sacatropes	Independent
City Councilor (3rd district)	15.	Jesus Teritorio	Independent

== Mayoral election ==
The incumbent mayor is Along Malapitan, who is serving his first term as mayor after being elected in 2022 with 56.13% of the vote. Malapitan is eligible for a second term.

Antonio Trillanes, a former senator and candidate for the Senate in 2022, expressed his interest in challenging Malapitan for the mayoralty in January 2024, signaling a 95% likelihood of running for the office in an interview with ANC. Trillanes later confirmed his bid for the office as a member of Aksyon Demokratiko on July 15, when he formally joined the party.

=== Candidates ===
==== Declared ====
- Along Malapitan (Nacionalista), incumbent mayor of Caloocan (2022–present)
- Antonio Trillanes (Aksyon), former senator of the Philippines (2007–2019)

=== Opinion polling ===
Fieldwork Date(s)	Pollster	Sample Size	MoE	Malapitan Nacionalista	Trillanes Aksyon	Others	Undecided
October 20–24, 2024	SWS	1,000	±3%	81%	15%	0.11%	2%

=== Results ===
2025 Caloocan mayoral election
Candidate	Party	Votes	%
Along Malapitan (incumbent)	Nacionalista	348,211	59.50
Antonio Trillanes IV	Aksyon	229,512	39.22
Danny Villanueva	Independent	3,126	0.53
Richard Cañete	Independent	2,323	0.40
Ronnie Malunes	Independent	2,015	0.34
Total		585,187	100.00
Nacionalista hold			

== Vice mayoral election ==
The incumbent vice mayor is Karina Teh-Limsico, who is serving her first term after being elected in 2022 with 62.28% of the vote. Teh-Limsico is eligible for a second term. She will face a rematch from former councilor PJ Malonzo, whom she defeated in the 2022 vice mayoral race.

=== Candidates ===
==== Declared ====
- PJ Malonzo (Aksyon) – former city councilor (2016–2022)
- Karina Teh – incumbent vice mayor of Caloocan (2022–present)

=== Results ===
2025 Caloocan Vice mayoral election
Candidate	Party	Votes	%
Karina Teh (incumbent)	Nacionalista	350,980	62.32
PJ Malonzo	Aksyon	196,707	34.93
Dante Lustre	Independent	5,778	1.03
Joseph Timbol	Independent	5,271	0.94
Rolando Tobias	Independent	4,416	0.78
Total		563,152	100.00
Nacionalista hold			

== City Council election ==
The Caloocan City Council is composed of 20 members, 18 of which are elected through plurality block voting to serve three-year terms. The councilors represent the city's three councilor districts, which are coextensive with the congressional districts, with six members being elected per district.

Party or alliance		Votes	%	Seats
Team Aksyon at Malasakit	Nacionalista Party	1,583,451	62.13	13
Team Aksyon at Malasakit	National Unity Party	88,633	3.48	1
Team Aksyon at Malasakit	Lakas–CMD	82,626	3.24	1
Team Aksyon at Malasakit	Total	1,754,710	68.85	15
Aksyon Demokratiko		527,361	20.69	1
Liberal Party		217,730	8.54	2
People's Reform Party		25,313	0.99	0
Makabayan		23,593	0.93	0
Ex officio seats				2
Total		2,548,707	100.00	20

=== Results ===
==== First District ====
2025 Caloocan City Council election in the 1st district
Candidate	Party or alliance		Votes	%
Vincent Ryan "Enteng" Malapitan (incumbent)	Team Aksyon at Malasakit	Nacionalista	177,817	59.77
Ray Christopher "Topet" Adalem (incumbent)	Team Aksyon at Malasakit	Nacionalista	159,198	53.51
Leah Bacolod (incumbent)	Team Aksyon at Malasakit	Nacionalista	157,984	53.11
Orvince Howard "Vince" Hernandez (incumbent)	Team Aksyon at Malasakit	Nacionalista	135,614	45.59
Alex Caralde (incumbent)	Team Aksyon at Malasakit	Nacionalista	135,213	45.45
Jacqueline "Kaye" Nubla (incumbent)	Team Trillanes	Aksyon	129,845	43.65
Marjorie Barretto	Team Aksyon at Malasakit	Nacionalista	112,624	37.86
Nemesio "Mining" B. Faustino	Team Trillanes	Aksyon	74,113	24.91
Michael "Mickey" Bunag	Team Trillanes	Aksyon	66,338	22.30
Angie Leonardo	Team Trillanes	Aksyon	60,445	20.32
Edsan Pineda	Independent		33,928	11.40
Tyrone De Leon Sr.	Independent		24,892	8.37
Ricardo Margallo	Makabayan		23,593	7.93
Jericho Sy	Independent		20,824	7.00
Roman Domasig Jr.	Independent		16,132	5.42
Buddy Lipata	Independent		12,157	4.09
Anser Tomas	Independent		11,753	3.95
George Miran	Independent		11,170	3.75
Patricio Tapiengco	Independent		10,732	3.61
Total			1,374,372	100.00

==== Second District ====
2025 Caloocan City Council election in the 2nd district
Candidate	Party or alliance		Votes	%
Jose Lorenzo "Lanz" Almeda (incumbent)	Team Aksyon at Malasakit	NUP	88,633	47.16
Ken Aruelo	Team Aksyon at Malasakit	Lakas	82,626	43.96
Alexander "Alex" Mangasar	Team Bughaw	Liberal	82,062	43.66
Cons Asistio	Team Aksyon at Malasakit	Nacionalista	80,824	43.00
Charm Quimpo	Team Bughaw	Liberal	80,155	42.65
Carolyn "Carol" Cunanan (incumbent)	Team Aksyon at Malasakit	Nacionalista	73,330	39.02
Arnold Divina (incumbent)	Team Aksyon at Malasakit	Nacionalista	69,825	37.15
James Abel	Team Aksyon at Malasakit	Nacionalista	59,588	31.70
Emmanuel "Wewel" De Leon (incumbent)	Team Trillanes	Aksyon	59,015	31.40
Lemuel Simpauco	Team Bughaw	Liberal	55,513	29.54
Joehari Cudiamat	Independent		44,133	23.48
Marienne Princess "Dra. Mayen" Mercado	Team Trillanes	Aksyon	38,730	20.61
Renato Celis	People's Reform Party		25,313	13.47
Freddie Del Rosario	Independent		21,071	11.21
Jefferson Paspie	Team Trillanes	Aksyon	17,208	9.16
Dennis Baldivia	Independent		9,320	4.96
Joseph Tenorio	Independent		5,275	2.81
Jennet Tam	Independent		4,444	2.36
Joe Palicte	Independent		3,141	1.67
Total			900,206	100.00

==== Third District ====
2025 Caloocan City Council election in the 3rd district
Candidate	Party or alliance		Votes	%
Kingjohn Ericson "King" Echiverri (incumbent)	Team Aksyon at Malasakit	Nacionalista	82,483	68.68
Merwyn Lennon "Win" Abel (incumbent)	Team Aksyon at Malasakit	Nacionalista	76,880	64.01
Aurora "Onet" Henson Jr. (incumbent)	Team Aksyon at Malasakit	Nacionalista	68,489	57.03
Patrick "Bullet" Prado (incumbent)	Team Aksyon at Malasakit	Nacionalista	67,873	56.51
Carliza May Africa-Del Rosario (incumbent)	Team Aksyon at Malasakit	Nacionalista	65,193	54.28
Theresita "Tess" Ceralde (incumbent)	Team Aksyon at Malasakit	Nacionalista	60,516	50.39
Bernard Domingo	Independent		35,550	29.60
Marylou "Alou" Nubla-San Buenaventura	Team Trillanes	Aksyon	34,501	28.73
Rowel Brin	Team Trillanes	Aksyon	24,897	20.73
Ma. Milagros "Rose" Mercado	Team Trillanes	Aksyon	22,269	18.54
Merly Padilla	Independent		6,597	5.49
Carina Sacatropes	Independent		5,205	4.33
Julita Omit	Independent		5,149	4.29
Jesus Teritorio	Independent		4,821	4.01
Albert Gabuay	Independent		4,751	3.96
Total			565,174	100.00

== House of Representatives elections ==
=== First district ===
The incumbent representative is Oscar Malapitan, who is serving his first term after being elected in 2022 with 74.27% of the vote. Malapitan is eligible for a second term.

Former mayor Rey Malonzo is expected to challenge Malapitan; they last faced off for this position in 2004.

2025 Philippine House of Representatives election in Caloocan's 1st district
Candidate	Party	Votes	%
Oscar Malapitan (incumbent)	Nacionalista	198,244	71.79
Rey Malonzo	KANP	69,298	25.10
Johram Alama	Independent	8,596	3.11
Total		276,138	100.00
Nacionalista hold			

=== Second district ===
The incumbent representative is Mitch Cajayon-Uy, who is serving her first term after being elected in 2022 with 35.20% of the vote. Cajayon-Uy is eligible for a second term.

Former representative and 2022 mayoral candidate Edgar Erice was expected to challenge Cajayon-Uy for the seat for the fourth time, with him winning the two previous contests (2013 and 2016). However, on November 22, 2024, he was disqualified by the Commission on Elections (Comelec) Second Division for "propagating false information across multiple platforms" in regards to his accusations against Comelec and Miru Systems of election rigging. His disqualification was deemed final by the Comelec en banc on December 27, but in January 2025, the Supreme Court issued a TRO in favor of Erice against the Comelec disqualification order.

2025 Philippine House of Representatives election in Caloocan's 2nd district
Candidate	Party	Votes	%
Edgar Erice	Liberal Party	104,993	58.19
Mitch Cajayon-Uy (incumbent)	Lakas–CMD	75,452	41.81
Total		180,445	100.00
Liberal Party gain from Lakas–CMD			

=== Third district ===
The incumbent representative is Dean Asistio, who is serving his first term after being elected in 2022 with 55.79% of the vote. Asistio is eligible for a second term.

2025 Philippine House of Representatives election in Caloocan's 3rd district
Candidate	Party	Votes	%
Dean Asistio (incumbent)	Lakas–CMD	93,708	100.00
Total		93,708	100.00
Lakas–CMD hold			
