= 2019 Caloocan local elections =

15th City and Mayoral elections in Caloocan

2019 Caloocan Mayoral Election
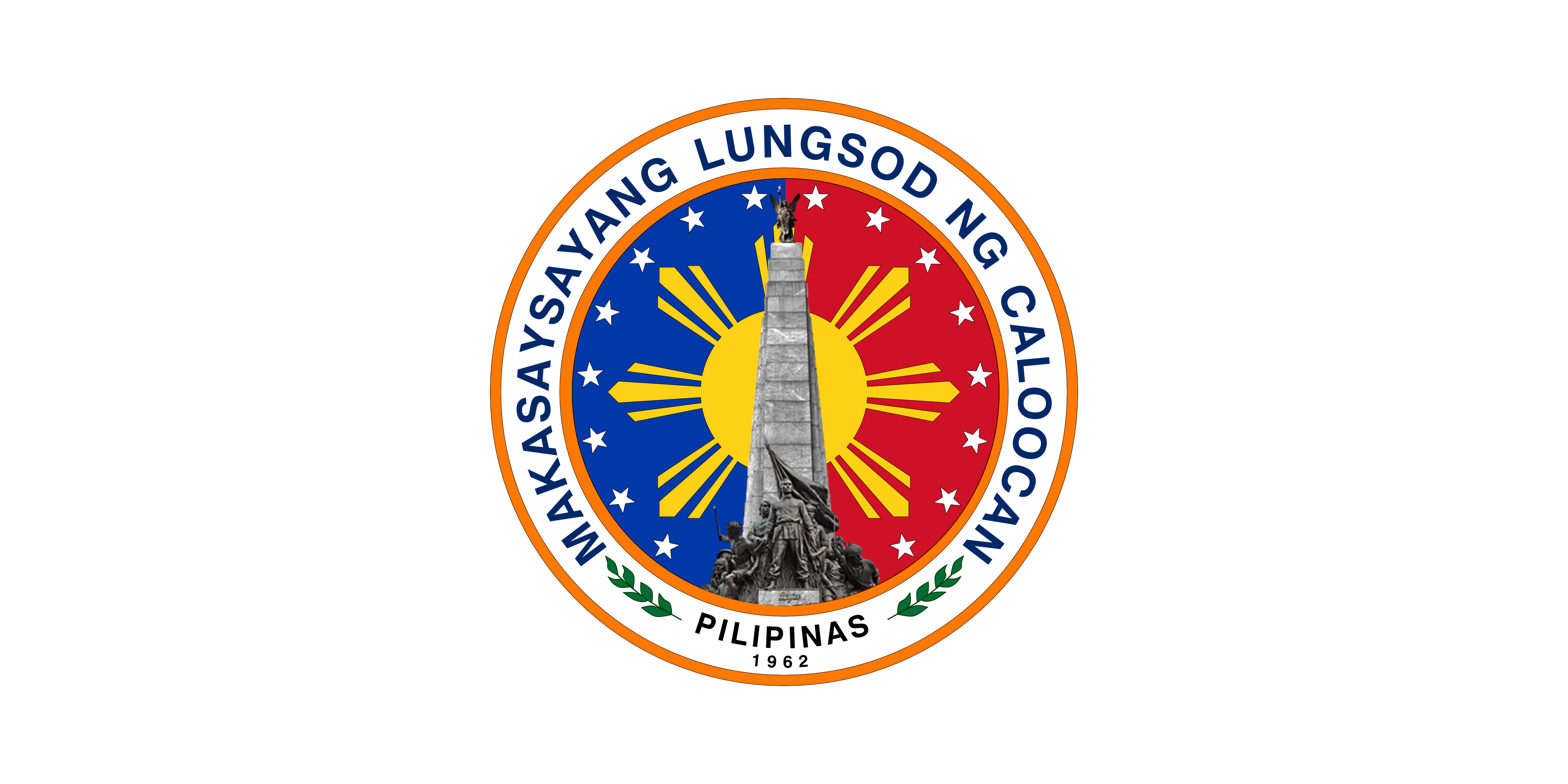
- May 13, 2019
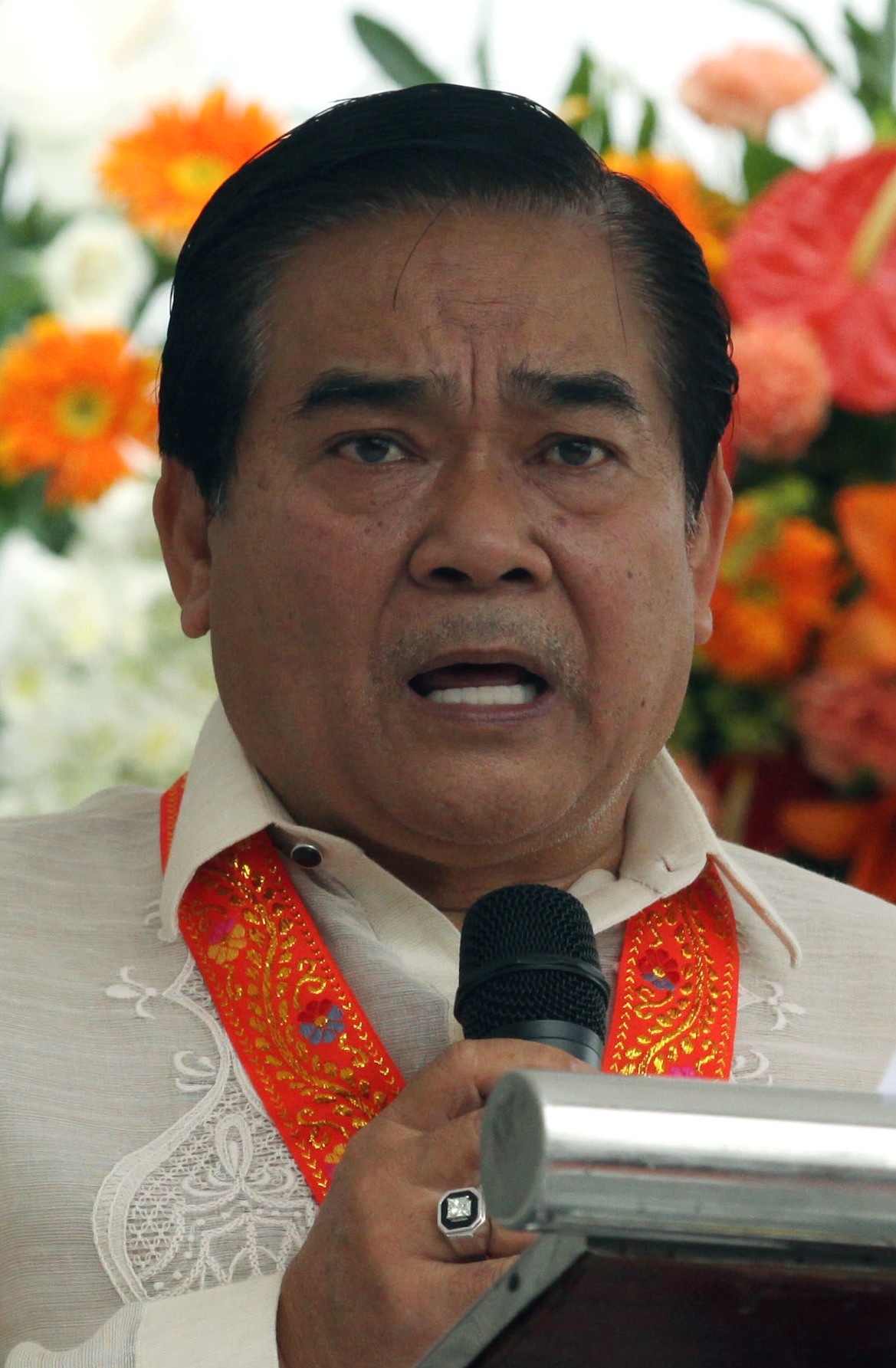
Nominee	Oscar "Oca" Malapitan
Party	Nacionalista
Running mate	Luis Macario "Maca" Asistio III
Popular vote	430,137
Percentage	96.70%
Mayor before election
Oscar Malapitan
Nacionalista
Elected mayor
Oscar Malapitan
Nacionalista
- Vice mayoral election
Candidate	Luis Macario Asisitio III
Party	NPC
Popular vote	376,075
Percentage	100.00%
Vice Mayor before election
Luis Macario "Maca" Asistio III
NPC
Elected Vice Mayor
Luis Macario "Maca" Asistio III
NPC

Local elections in Caloocan were held on May 13, 2019, within the Philippine general election. The voters elected for the elective local posts in the city: the mayor, vice mayor, the two Congressmen, and the councilors, six in each of the city's two legislative districts.

== Background ==
Mayor Oscar "Oca" Malapitan ran for re-election for third and final term against Rufino "Ruffy" Bayon-on, Ronnie Malunes, Edgardo "Ed" Sevilla, Maximo "Max" Torrelino, and Emil Trinidad.

Vice Mayor Luis Macario "Maca" Asistio III ran for re-election for third and final term unopposed.

First District Rep. Dale Gonzalo "Along" Malapitan ran for re-election for second term unopposed.

Second District Rep. Edgar "Egay" Erice ran for re-election for third and final term against Noel Cabuhat.

== Results ==
=== For Representatives ===
==== First District ====
Rep. Dale Gonzalo "Along" Malapitan won unopposed.

Congressional Elections in Caloocan's First District
Party	Candidate	Votes	%
PDP–Laban	Dale Gonzalo "Along" Malapitan	284,851	100.00
Total votes		284,851	100.00
PDP–Laban hold			

==== Second District ====
Rep. Edgar "Egay" Erice defeated his only opponent Noel Cabuhat.

Congressional Election in Caloocan's Second District
Party	Candidate	Votes	%
Liberal	Edgar "Egay" Erice	124,223	90.30
NUP	Noel Cabuhat	13,349	9.70
Total votes		137,572	100.00
Liberal hold			

=== For Mayor ===
Mayor Oscar Malapitan won overwhelmingly against his opponents.

Caloocan Mayoral Election
Party	Candidate	Votes	%
Nacionalista	Oscar "Oca" Malapitan	430,137	96.70
Independent	Emil Trinidad	4,385	0.99
Independent	Rufino "Ruffy" Bayon-on	3,815	0.86
WPP	Ronnie Malunes	3,132	0.70
Independent	Edgardo "Ed" Sevilla	2,382	0.54
Independent	Maximo "Max" Torrelino	961	0.22
Total votes		444,812	100.00
Nacionalista hold			

=== For Vice Mayor ===
Vice Mayor Luis Macario "Maca" Asistio III won unopposed.

Caloocan Vice Mayoral Elections
Party	Candidate	Votes	%
NPC	Luis Macario "Maca" Asistio III	376,075	100.00
Total votes		376,075	100.00
NPC hold			

=== For Councilor ===
==== First District ====
City Council Elections in Caloocan's First District
Party	Candidate	Votes	%
Nacionalista	Vincent Ryan "Enteng" Malapitan	253,180	
Nacionalista	Anna Karina Teh	220,837	
PDP–Laban	Dean Asistio	214,035	
PDP–Laban	Christopher "PJ" Malonzo	205,938	
PFP	Carmelo "Jay" Africa III	186,323	
PDP–Laban	Marylou "Alou" Nubla-San Buenaventura	184,806	
PDP–Laban	Apolinario "Inar" Trinidad	71,029	
Independent	Ernesto Palma	26,987	
Independent	Roberto Aquino Jr.	26,789	
Filipino Family Party	Ramilo "Botchoy" Gadon	24,133	
Independent	Tyrone De Leon Sr.	20,720	
Independent	Romualdo "Pastor" Orbe	17,733	
Independent	Salvador Lipata Jr.	12,791	
Independent	Isidro Balanday	9,852	
Independent	Elmar Santarin	9,348	
Total votes		1,484,501	100.00

==== Second District ====
City Council Elections in Caloocan's Second District
Party	Candidate	Votes	%
PFP	Edgardo "Doc Ed" Aruelo	95,412	
Nacionalista	Luis "L.A" Asistio III	94,838	
PDP–Laban	Roberto "Obet" Samson	93,015	
Aksyon	Alexander "Alex" Mangasar	88,535	
NPC	Ma. Milagros "Rose" Mercado	82,566	
PDP–Laban	Ricardo "Carding" Bagus	77,546	
Nacionalista	Luis Chito Abel	73,829	
PFP	Dennis Macalintal	57,463	
PDP–Laban	Joseph Timbol	17,857	
Independent	Arnold Blanco	8,510	
Independent	Roy Valencia	7,875	
PDP–Laban	Edgardo "Bishop Boy" Espiritu	7,003	
Independent	Lauro Arcadio Jr.	4,997	
Independent	Jeffpril Felix	4,648	
Independent	Ronald Gadayan	3,516	
PFP	Rodolfo Salangsang	3,132	
Filipino Family Party	Bienvenido "Blam Blam" Tayao Jr.	1,773	
Total votes		722,515	100.00
