= 2022 Caloocan local elections =

16th City and Mayoral elections in Caloocan

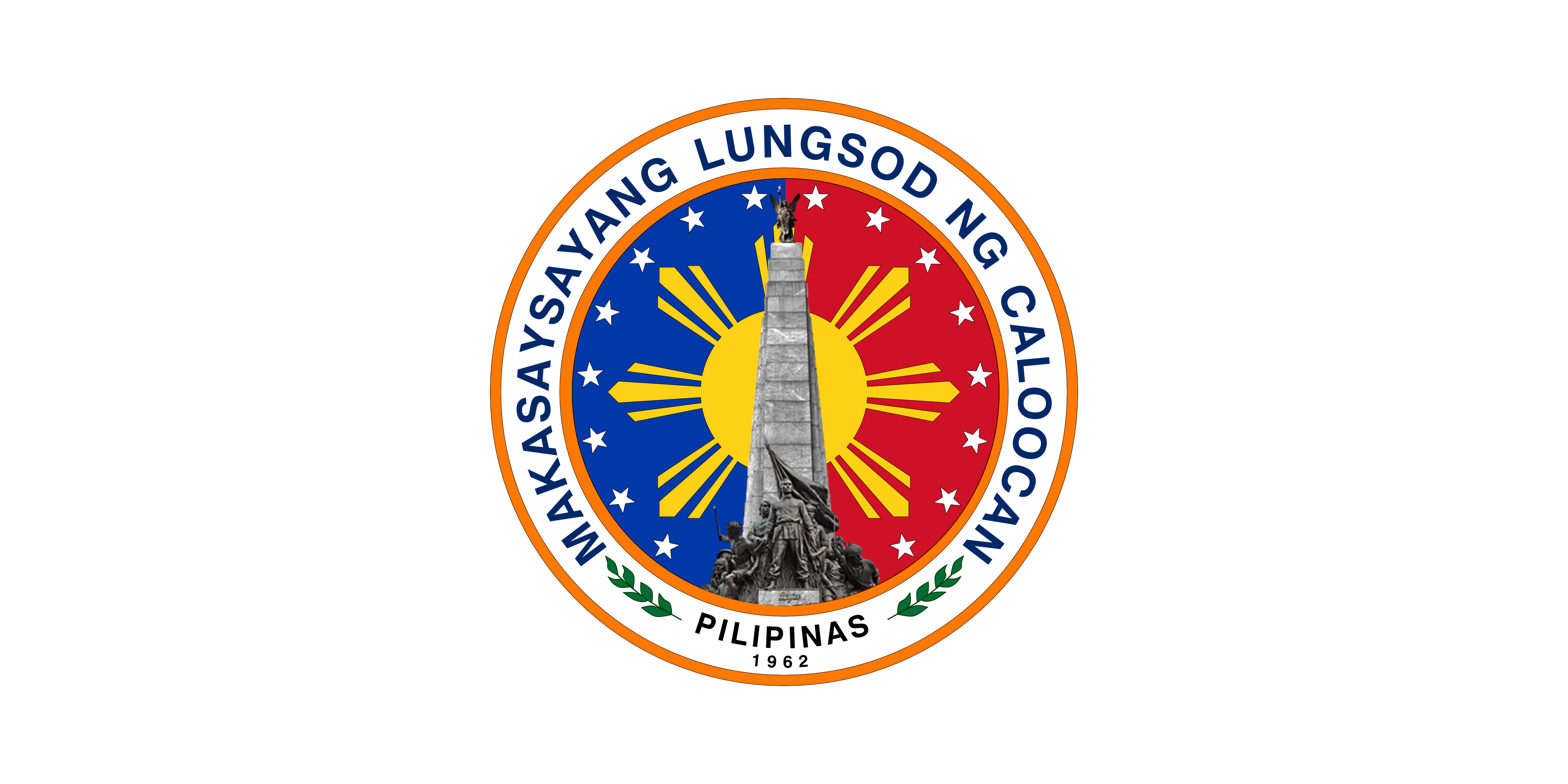
- May 9, 2022
- Turnout: 83.18%
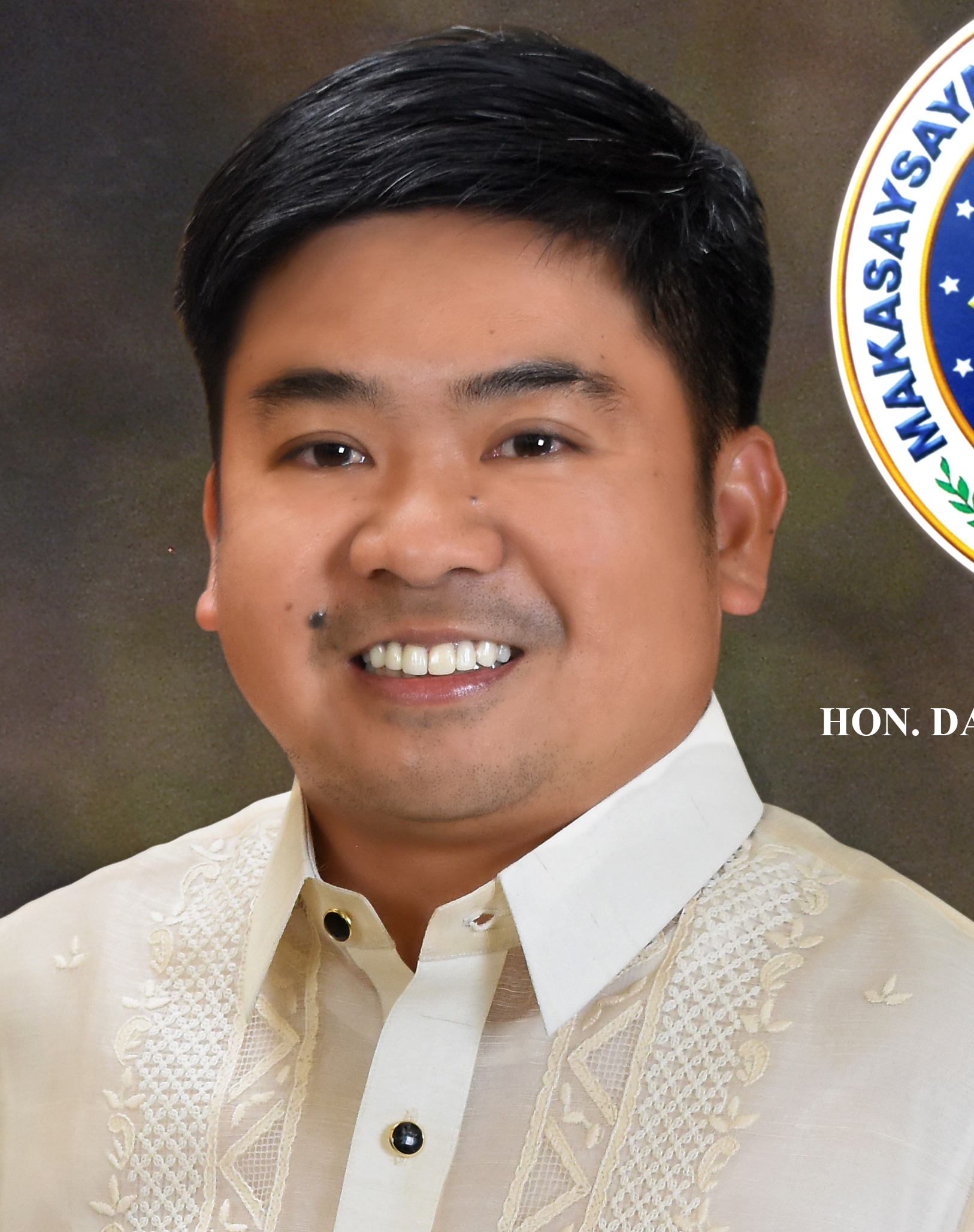

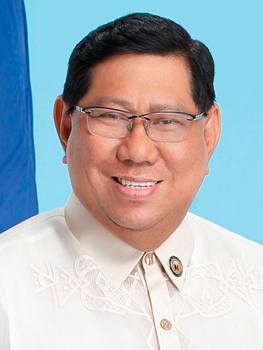
Nominee	Along Malapitan	Edgar Erice
Party	PDP–Laban	Aksyon
Alliance	Team Aksyon at Malasakit	Team Bughaw
Running mate	Karina Teh	PJ Malonzo
Popular vote	314,903	242,086
Percentage	56.13	43.15
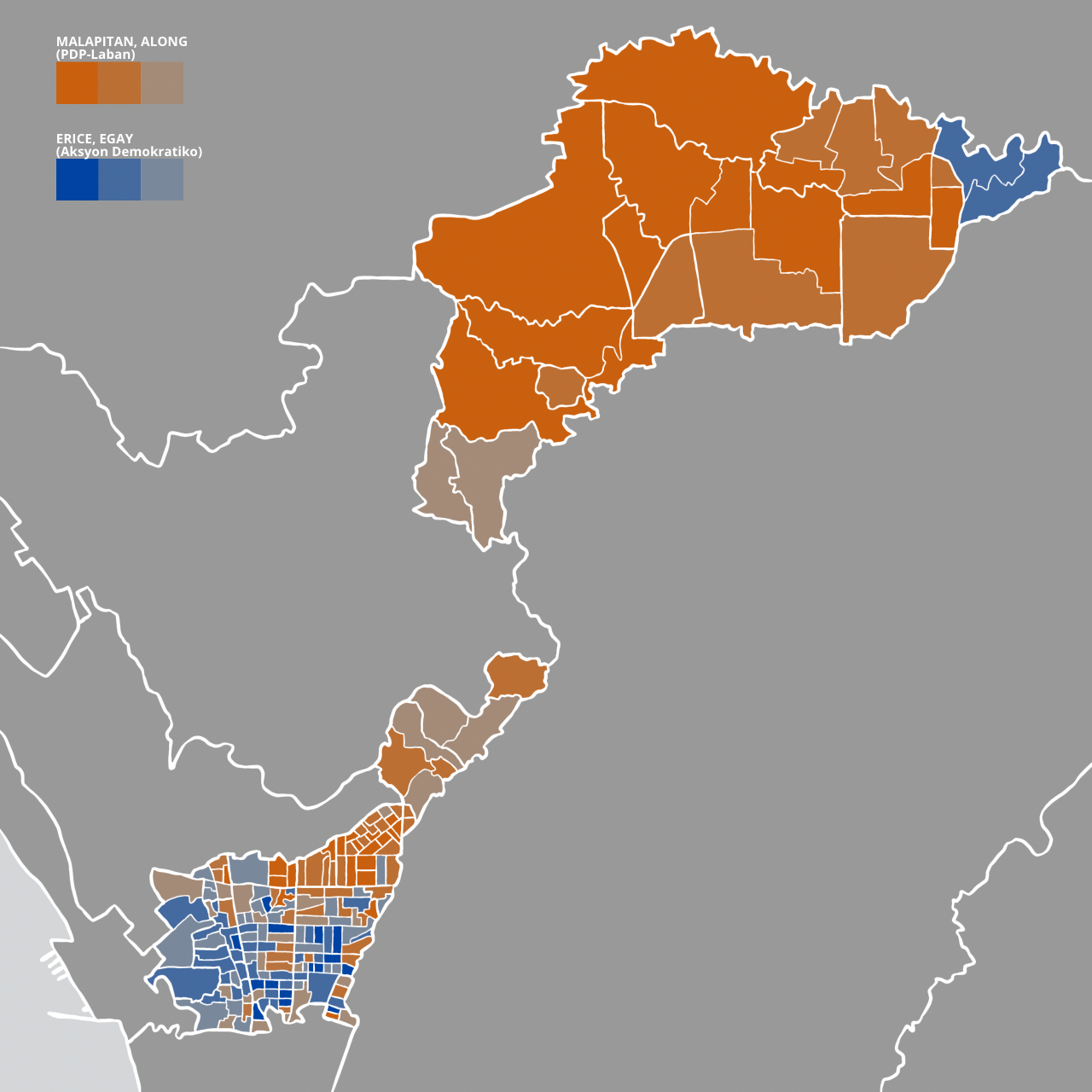
- A map showing the results of the Caloocan mayoral election in every barangay.
Mayor before election
Oscar Malapitan
Nacionalista
Elected mayor
Along Malapitan
PDP–Laban
- Vice mayoral election
Candidate	Karina Teh	PJ Malonzo
Party	Nacionalista	Aksyon
Alliance	Team Aksyon at Malasakit	Team Bughaw
Popular vote	324,568	185,671
Percentage	62.28%	35.63%
Vice Mayor before election
Luis Macario "Maca" Asistio III
NPC
Elected Vice Mayor
Karina Teh
Nacionalista

Local elections were held in Caloocan on May 9, 2022, within the Philippine general election. The voters elected the elective local posts in the city: the mayor, vice mayor, three representatives per district, and six councilor per district of the city.

== Background ==
Mayor Oscar "Oca" Malapitan was term-limited, and he sought congressional comeback to represent first district again. His party nominated his son, First District Rep. Dale Gonzalo "Along" Malapitan, who was on second term. Rep. Malapitan was challenged by Second District Rep. Edgar "Egay" Erice, who was term-limited. Other candidates for mayoral elections were: Alejandro "Jun" Anquilan, Rufino "Ruffy Nazareno" Bayon-on, Roman Domasig Jr., and Ronnie "Toto" Malunes.

Vice Mayor Luis Macario "Maca" Asistio III was term-limited, and he sought congressional seat to represent second district. His position were contested by First District councilors Anna Karina Teh-Limsico (Malapitan's running mate for vice mayor) and Christopher "PJ" Malonzo (Erice's running mate), as well as independent candidate Joseph Timbol.

First District Rep. Dale Gonzalo "Along" Malapitan did not run for re-election, instead he ran as mayor. He switched seats with his father, Mayor Oscar "Oca" Malapitan, who was term-limited. Mayor Malapitan was challenged by Councilor Marylou "Alou" Nubla-San Buenaventura, and independent candidate Violeta "Violy" Dela Cruz.

Second District Rep. Edgar "Egay" Erice was term-limited, and he ran for mayor. His party nominated Jacob Reuben Cabochan. He faced prominent figures, including Vice Mayor Luis Macario "Maca" Asistio III, former Rep. Mary Mitzi "Mitch" Cajayon-Uy, and councilors Alexander "Alex" Mangasar and Roberto "Obet" Samson.

The newly created Third District would elect its representative for the first time. The candidates were First District Councilor Dean Asistio, and former Mayor and First District Rep. Enrico "Recom" Echiverri.

== Tickets ==
=== Administration coalition ===
Team Aksyon at Malasakit
#	Name	Party
For Mayor
5.	Along Malapitan	PDP–Laban
For Vice Mayor
2.	Karina Teh	Nacionalista
For House Of Representatives (1st District)
1.	Oscar Malapitan	Nacionalista
For House Of Representatives (2nd District)
5.	Obet Samson	Lakas
For House Of Representatives (3rd District)
1.	Dean Asistio	PDP–Laban
For Councilor (1st District)
1.	Topet Adalem	Nacionalista
4.	Leah Bacolod	PDP–Laban
5.	Alex Caralde	Nacionalista
7.	Vince Hernandez	Lakas
8.	Enteng Malapitan	Nacionalista
13.	Romy Rivera	PROMDI
For Councilor (2nd District)
2.	Lanz Almeda	NUP
4.	Doc Ed Aruelo	PDP–Laban
5.	L.A. Asistio	Nacionalista
10.	Carol Cunanan	Nacionalista
12.	Arnold Divina	Nacionalista
15.	Melvin Rufino	Nacionalista
For Councilor (3rd District)
1.	Win Abel	Nacionalista
2.	May Africa-Del Rosario	Lakas
5.	Tess Ceralde	Nacionalista
8.	Onet Henson	Nacionalista
11.	Bullet Prado	Nacionalista
14.	Luis Tito Varela	Nacionalista

=== Primary opposition coalition ===
Team Bughaw
#	Name	Party
For Mayor
4.	Egay Erice	Aksyon
For Vice Mayor
1.	PJ Malonzo	Aksyon
For House Of Representatives (1st District)
2.	Alou Nubla-San Buenaventura	Aksyon
For House Of Representatives (2nd District)
2.	Jacob Cabochan	Aksyon
For House Of Representatives (3rd District)
2.	Enrico Echiverri	PDDS
For Councilor (1st District)
10.	Cenon Mayor	Aksyon
11.	Kaye Nubla	Aksyon
12.	Nick Repollo	Aksyon
14.	Inar Trinidad	Aksyon
15.	Mila Uy	Aksyon
16.	Gerry Viray	Aksyon
For Councilor (2nd District)
6.	Carding Bagus	Aksyon
7.	Dennis Baldivia	Aksyon
11.	Wewel De Leon	Aksyon
14.	Merville Orozco	Aksyon
16.	Lemuel Simpauco	Aksyon
For Councilor (3rd District)
3.	Rudy Brin	Aksyon
4.	Nico Cammayo	Aksyon
6.	King Echiverri	Aksyon
9.	Ato Oliva	Aksyon
12.	Hazel Segui-Quinto	Aksyon
13.	Joma Ramirez	Aksyon

=== Other coalitions and parties ===
Nationalist People's Coalition
#	Name	Party
For House Of Representatives (2nd District)
1.	Maca Asistio	NPC
For Councilor (1st District)
3.	Tonton Asistio	NPC
For Councilor (2nd District)
1.	Armani Aguilar Alcayaga	NPC
13.	Mayen Mercado	NPC

Partido para sa Demokratikong Reporma
#	Name	Party
For House Of Representatives (2nd District)
4.	Alex Mangasar	Reporma

Partido Demokratiko Pilipino-Lakas ng Bayan
#	Name	Party
For House Of Representatives (2nd District)
3.	Mitch Cajayon-Uy	PDP–Laban

Partido Lakas ng Masa
#	Name	Party
For Councilor (1st District)
17.	Glenn Ymata	PLM

Labor Party Philippines
#	Name	Party
For Councilor (2nd District)
9.	Ka Rene Celis	WPP

Pederalismo ng Dugong Dakilang Samahan
#	Name	Party
For Councilor (3rd District)
10.	Earny Palma	PDDS

== Results ==
=== For Mayor ===
First District Rep. Dale Gonzalo "Along" Malapitan defeated his fellow representative, former Vice Mayor Edgar Erice of the second district. Malapitan won over Erice in a tight election.

Caloocan Mayoral Election
Party	Candidate	Votes	%
PDP–Laban	Dale Gonzalo "Along" Malapitan	314,903	56.13
Aksyon	Edgar "Egay" Erice	242,086	43.15
Independent	Roman Domasig Jr.	1,370	0.24
Independent	Ronnie "Toto" Malunes	901	0.16
Independent	Alejandro "Jun" Anquilan	883	0.16
Independent	Rufino "Ruffy Nazareno" Bayon-on	876	0.16
Total votes		561,019	100.00
PDP–Laban hold			

=== For Vice Mayor ===
First District Councilor Anna Karina Teh-Limsico defeated her fellow councilor, Christopher "PJ" Malonzo.

Caloocan Vice Mayoral Election
Party	Candidate	Votes	%
Nacionalista	Anna Karina Teh-Limsico	324,568	62.28
Aksyon	Christopher "PJ" Malonzo	185,671	35.63
Independent	Joseph "Bok" Timbol	10,864	2.08
Total votes		521,103	100.00
Nacionalista hold			

=== For Representative ===
==== First District ====
Mayor Oscar "Oca" Malapitan defeated Councilor Marylou "Alou" Nubla-San Buenaventura.

Congressional Elections in Caloocan's First District
Party	Candidate	Votes	%
Nacionalista	Oscar "Oca" Malapitan	195,705	74.27
Aksyon	Marylou "Alou" Nubla-San Buenaventura	63,604	24.14
Independent	Violeta "Violy" Dela Cruz	4,207	1.60
Total votes		263,516	100.00
Nacionalista hold			

==== Second District ====
Former Rep. Mary Mitzi "Mitch" Cajayon-Uy won in a tight election. Cajayon-Uy defeated her rivals, including councilors Roberto Samson and Alexander Mangasar, Vice Mayor Macario "Maca" Asistio III, and Jacob Reuben Cabochan.

Congressional Elections in Caloocan's Second District
Party	Candidate	Votes	%
PDP–Laban	Mary Mitzi "Mitch" Cajayon-Uy	63,669	35.20
Lakas	Roberto "Obet" Samson	41,057	22.70
NPC	Luis Macario "Maca" Asistio III	28,603	15.81
Reporma	Alexander "Alex" Mangasar	26,870	14.86
Aksyon	Jacob Reuben Cabochan	20,672	11.43
Total votes		180,871	100.00
PDP–Laban hold			

==== Third District ====
First District Councilor Dean Asistio won over former Mayor Enrico Echiverri in a tight election. Asistio will now represent the city's newly created third district.

Congressional Elections in Caloocan's Newly-Created Third District
Party	Candidate	Votes	%
PDP–Laban	Dean Asistio	54,319	55.79
PDDS	Enrico "Recom" Echiverri	43,044	44.21
Total votes		97,363	100.00
PDP–Laban hold			

=== For Councilors ===
Party or alliance		Votes	%	Seats
Team Aksyon at Malasakit	Nacionalista Party	941,661	33.67	10
Team Aksyon at Malasakit	Partido Demokratiko Pilipino-Lakas ng Bayan	238,921	8.54	2
Team Aksyon at Malasakit	Lakas-CMD	171,699	6.14	2
Team Aksyon at Malasakit	Progressive Movement for the Devolution of Initiatives	96,856	3.46	0
Team Aksyon at Malasakit	National Unity Party	88,349	3.16	1
Team Aksyon at Malasakit	Total	1,537,486	54.97	15
Aksyon Demokratiko		916,216	32.76	3
Nationalist People's Coalition		186,656	6.67	0
Labor Party Philippines		42,064	1.50	0
Partido Lakas ng Masa		16,027	0.57	0
Pederalismo ng Dugong Dakilang Samahan		3,798	0.14	0
Independent		94,500	3.38	0
Ex officio seats				2
Total		2,796,747	100.00	20

==== First District ====
City Council Elections in Caloocan's First District
Party	Candidate	Votes	%
Nacionalista	Vincent Ryan "Enteng" Malapitan	171,080	29.37
Nacionalista	Ray Christopher "Topet" Adalem	138,308	23.74
Aksyon	Jacqueline "Kaye" Nubla	129,186	22.18
PDP–Laban	Leah Bacolod	129,046	22.15
Lakas	Orvince Howard "Vince" Hernandez	123,420	21.19
Nacionalista	Alexander "Alex" Caralde	97,007	16.65
PROMDI	Romeo "Romy" Rivera	96,856	16.63
NPC	Antonio "Tonton" Asistio II	90,820	15.59
Aksyon	Apolinario "Inar" Trinidad	76,211	13.08
Aksyon	Cenon Mayor	70,575	12.12
Aksyon	Geremias "Gerry" Viray	69,672	11.96
Aksyon	Mila Uy	60,063	10.31
Aksyon	Nicanor "Nick" Repollo	51,536	8.85
Independent	Tyrone De Leon Sr.	18,282	3.14
PLM	Glenn Ymata	16,027	2.75
Independent	Roberto Aquino Jr.	15,733	2.70
Independent	Rodolfo Maniago	10,462	1.80
Total votes		1,364,284	100.00

Party or alliance		Votes	%	Seats
Team Aksyon at Malasakit	Nacionalista Party	406,395	29.79	3
Team Aksyon at Malasakit	Partido Demokratiko Pilipino-Lakas ng Bayan	129,046	9.46	1
Team Aksyon at Malasakit	Lakas-CMD	123,420	9.05	1
Team Aksyon at Malasakit	Progressive Movement for the Devolution of Initiatives	96,856	7.10	0
Team Aksyon at Malasakit	Total	755,717	55.39	5
Aksyon Demokratiko		457,243	33.52	1
Nationalist People's Coalition		90,820	6.66	0
Partido Lakas ng Masa		16,027	1.17	0
Independent		44,477	3.26	0
Total		1,364,284	100.00	6

==== Second District ====
City Council Elections in Caloocan's Second District
Party	Candidate	Votes	%
PDP–Laban	Edgardo "Doc Ed" Aruelo	109,875	18.86
Nacionalista	Luis "L.A" Asistio III	92,245	15.84
NUP	Jose Lorenzo "Lanz" Almeda	88,349	15.17
Nacionalista	Carolyn "Carol" Cunanan	85,746	14.72
Aksyon	Emmanuel "Wewel" De Leon	75,280	12.92
Nacionalista	Arnold Divina	67,688	11.62
Aksyon	Ricardo "Carding" Bagus	67,185	11.53
NPC	Marienne Princess "Dra. Mayen" Mercado	56,534	9.71
Nacionalista	Melvin Rufino	50,791	8.72
Aksyon	Lemuel Simpauco	48,800	8.38
WPP	Renato "Ka Rene" Celis	42,064	7.22
NPC	Armani Mikhail "AAA" Aguilar Alcayaga	39,302	6.75
Aksyon	Dennis Esteban "Dennis Padilla" Baldivia	32,208	5.53
Aksyon	Marc Merville Orozco	28,872	4.96
Independent	Noel Cabuhat	16,031	2.75
Independent	Robert Antonio	9,119	1.57
Total votes		910,089	100.00

Party or alliance		Votes	%	Seats
Team Aksyon at Malasakit	Nacionalista Party	296,470	32.58	3
Team Aksyon at Malasakit	Partido Demokratiko Pilipino-Lakas ng Bayan	109,875	12.07	1
Team Aksyon at Malasakit	National Unity Party	88,349	9.71	1
Team Aksyon at Malasakit	Total	494,694	54.36	5
Aksyon Demokratiko		252,345	27.73	1
Nationalist People's Coalition		95,836	10.53	0
Labor Party Philippines		42,064	4.62	0
Independent		25,150	2.76	0
Total		910,089	100.00	6

==== Third District ====
City Council Elections in Caloocan's Newly-Created Third District
Party	Candidate	Votes	%
Nacionalista	Merwyn Lennon "Win" Abel	60,336	10.36
Aksyon	Kingjohn Ericson "King" Echiverri	52,696	9.05
Nacionalista	Patrick "Bullet" Prado	49,659	8.52
Nacionalista	Aurora "Onet" Henson Jr.	49,375	8.48
Lakas	Carliza May Africa-Del Rosario	48,279	8.29
Nacionalista	Theresita "Tess" Ceralde	42,560	7.31
Aksyon	Rodolfo "Ato" Oliva	40,227	6.91
Nacionalista	Luis "Tito" Varela	36,866	6.33
Aksyon	Jose "Joma" Ramirez	34,663	5.95
Aksyon	Rodolfo "Rudy" Brin	29,347	5.04
Aksyon	Nicasio "Nico" Cammayo III	28,242	4.85
Aksyon	Ma. Liera Hazeline "Hazel" Segui Quinto	21,453	3.68
Independent	Angelo "Alfred" Vargas	19,523	3.35
Independent	Carlos Amador "Team Pangarap" Fenequito	5,350	0.92
PDDS	Ernesto "Earny" Palma	3,798	0.65
Total votes		522,374	100.00

Party or alliance		Votes	%	Seats
Team Aksyon at Malasakit	Nacionalista Party	238,796	45.71	4
Team Aksyon at Malasakit	Lakas-CMD	48,279	9.24	1
Team Aksyon at Malasakit	Total	287,075	54.96	5
Aksyon Demokratiko		206,628	39.56	1
Pederalismo ng Dugong Dakilang Samahan		3,798	0.73	0
Independent		24,873	4.76	0
Total		522,374	100.00	6
