= PJ Malonzo =

Filipino actor and politician

Member of the Caloocan City Council from the 1st district
- In office June 30, 2016 – June 30, 2022
- In office April – May 2005
- Appointed by: Gloria Macapagal Arroyo

Personal details
- Born: Christopher Emnace Malonzo; February 2, 1981 (age 45) Santa Cruz, Manila, Philippines
- Party: Aksyon (2021–present)
- Other political affiliations: PDP–Laban (2018–2021); UNA (2015–2018)
- Spouse: Sheena Flores (m. 2006)
- Children: 2
- Parents: Rey Malonzo (father); Gwendolyn Emnace Malonzo (mother)
- Education: University of Santo Tomas (AB); University of Makati (MDMG)

Christopher "PJ" Emnace Malonzo (born February 2, 1981) is a Filipino politician and former actor who last served as a city councilor of Caloocan from the city's 1st district from 2016 to 2022.

== Early life ==
Malonzo was born to actors Rey Malonzo and Gwendolyn Emnace. He attended Notre Dame of Greater Manila, graduating in 1994. He pursued a Bachelor of Arts in Economics at the University of Santo Tomas, studying there from 1998 to 2002. He later completed a master's degree in Development Management and Governance at the University of Makati.

== Political career ==
PJ Malonzo was initially appointed as Caloocan City councilor by President Gloria Macapagal Arroyo on April 1, 2005 after the death of Councilor Eduardo "Popoy" Rosca two months prior. The appointment received pushback by city government officials who had intended to recommend Rosca's daughter Kristen Joy for the position. By May 2005, the Caloocan Regional Trial Court Branch 131 issued a decision indefinitely barring Malonzo from taking the vacant council seat.

Malonzo was elected councilor of Caloocan under the United Nationalist Alliance as part of the electoral team of Mayor Oscar Malapitan in 2016.

On February 17, 2021, Mayor Malapitan filed a cyberlibel complaint against Malonzo and four other councilors due to their accusations that his government procured substandard digital tablets for schools from a company named Cosmic Technology Inc. By June 2, 2021, Malonzo and fellow councilors Marylou Nubla and Alexander Mangasar filed a graft complaint before the Office of the Ombudsman against Malapitan and Education Undersecretary Alain del Pascua among others.

On September 20, 2021, Malonzo joined the Aksyon Demokratiko party alongside Congressman Edgar Erice and five other councilors. In 2022, Malonzo attempted to run for vice mayor with mayoral aspirant Erice, but lost to fellow councilor Karina Teh.

On October 3, 2024, Malonzo filed his certificate of candidacy for Caloocan vice mayor, as the running mate of former senator Antonio Trillanes IV in the 2025 mayoral election. However, he lost the vice mayoralty race once again to Teh.

== Filmography ==
=== Film ===
Year	Title	Role	Note(s)	Ref(s).
2003	Homecoming			
2003	Captain Barbell	Lastikman		
2003	Fantastic Man	PJ		
